= List of members of the Camorra =

This is a list of members of the Camorra, a Mafia-type organisation in Naples and Campania in Italy.

== A ==
- Enrico Alfano
- Carmine Alfieri
- Raffaele Amato
- Umberto Ammaturo

== B ==
- Luigi Baccante
- Antonio Bardellino
- Pasquale Barra
- Domenico Bidognetti
- Francesco Bidognetti
- Patrizio Bosti

== C ==
- Ciccio Cappuccio
- Vincenzo Casillo
- Mario Caterino
- Ferdinando Cesarano
- Renato Cinquegranella
- Edoardo Contini
- Raffaele Cutolo
- Rosetta Cutolo

== D ==
- Pasquale D'Amico
- Salvatore De Crescenzo
- Giuseppe Dell'Aquila
- Cosimo Di Lauro
- Marco Di Lauro
- Paolo Di Lauro
- Raffaele Diana
- Paolo Di Mauro

== E ==
- Luigi Esposito

== F ==
- Mario Fabbrocino

== G ==
- Ketty Gabriele
- Pasquale Galasso
- Erminia Giuliano
- Luigi Giuliano

== I ==
- Mario Umberto Imparato
- Antonio Iovine

== L ==
- Antonio La Torre
- Augusto La Torre
- Gennaro Licciardi
- Maria Licciardi
- Vincenzo Licciardi
- Salvatore Lo Russo

== M ==
- Francesco Mallardo
- Pupetta Maresca
- Francesco Matrone
- Ciro Mazzarella
- Gennaro Mazzarella
- Giuseppe Misso

== N ==
- Lorenzo Nuvoletta

== P ==
- Cesare Pagano
- Nicola Panaro
- Giovanni Pandico
- Giuseppe Polverino
- Giuseppe Puca

== R ==
- Luigi Riccio
- Alfonso Rosanova
- Pasquale Russo
- Salvatore Russo

== S ==
- Carmine Schiavone
- Francesco Schiavone "Sandokan"
- Francesco Schiavone "Cicciariello"
- Pasquale Scotti
- Marzio Sepe
- Giuseppe Setola
- Pasquale Simonetti
- Antonio Spavone
- Raffaele Stolder

== V ==
- Luigi Vollaro

== Z ==
- Michele Zagaria
- Michele Zaza
