= Raffaele Diana =

- Born: 1953; San Cipriano d'Aversa

Raffaele Diana (Italian pronunciation: [raffaˈɛːle ˈdjaːna]; born in 1953) is an Italian Camorrista and senior boss of the Casalesi clan from Caserta. His nickname is Rafilotto.

== Background ==
A native of San Cipriano d'Aversa, Diana joined the Casalesi clan in late 70's, back when it was united under one single leader Antonio Bardellino who controlled the clan from his base in Brazil. He became close with Mario Iovine, Bardellino's right-hand man. Diana was widely believed to be one of responsible for the murder of Paride Salzillo, a nephew of the Casalesi boss. Salzillo was murdered in March 1988, the same day that Bardellino was killed.

He played a key role in the Casalesi's war against the Nuova Camorra Organizzata, participating in the infamous, the Pagano Mennillo-Orsi-Gagliardi murders, in which Casalesi members positioned a machine gun on a hill in Ponte Annicchino and opened fire, killing four Cutoliani in Casal di Principe on 22 April 1989. Diana was one of the top-ranking Casalesi clan figures who was arrested on 13 December 1990, in Santa Lucia carabinieri operation together with Francesco Schiavone, Francesco Bidognetti, Francesco Schiavone, and Giuseppe Russo. Shortly after being released, he was sent by the Italian government on an internal exile to Modena, where he organized a tour of extortion in Emilia-Romagna, where he was again arrested in Operation Zues.

== Life as a fugitive and capture ==
Diana became a fugitive in 2004 after having been sentenced to seven and a half years imprisonment. Shortly after, he was added to the List of thirty most wanted fugitives in Italy. He was sentenced to life imprisonment in absentia along with fugitive Casalesi bosses Antonio Iovine and Michele Zagaria at the culmination of the ten-year-long Spartacus Maxi-Trial on 19 June 2008.

Raffaele Diana was eventually arrested on 2 May 2009, after having been on the run for five years. He was captured by officers of the mobile team of Caserta in an apartment in Casal di Principe, near Caserta, where he was hidden in a bunker of cement produced in the stairwell. He was found in possession of two loaded pistols and some ammunition. A copy of the Gospel, a book of Padre Pio of Pietrelcina, a copy of The Godfather and Il Capo dei Capi were also found. Diana's arrest was believed by law enforcement to have delivered a huge blow to the Casalesi.
