= Nicola Panaro =

Italian criminal

Nicola Panaro (Italian pronunciation: [niˈkɔːla paˈnaːro]; born September 12, 1968, in Casal di Principe), is an Italian Camorrista and member in the Casalesi clan from Casal di Principe in the province of Caserta between Naples and Salerno. He has been on the "most wanted list" of the Italian ministry of the Interior since 2003 until his arrest in April 2010. Convicted for extortion and membership in the Camorra, he has yet to serve a prison sentence of nine years and four months.

He is a nephew of Casalesi boss Francesco Schiavone and considered to be the actual leader of the clan with Schiavone's wife Giuseppina Nappa, Vincenzo Schiavone and Mario Caterino. He was first arrested in March 1999 for racketeering and Mafia association. He was also charged with the murder of Aldo Scalzone in 1991. The Camorra considered Scalzone to be a police informer. Panaro was released in 2002 after his lawyers demonstrated that testimonies of Camorra turncoats were insufficient. Since his release he became a fugitive.

His brother Sebastiano Panaro received a life sentence at the Spartacus Trial against the Casalesi clan. Nicola Panaro is accused of being the intermediary of the clan in financial transactions with Nicola Cosentino, Undersecretary to the Ministry of Economy of Premier Berlusconi’s fourth Government and head of Berlusconi's People of Freedom (PdL) party in Campania.

On January 8, 2009, an international warrant was issued against him, to be arrested for extradition. He was arrested on April 14, 2010, in Lusciano (Italy).
