= Antonio Bardellino =

Casalesi clan boss (1945–1988)

- Antonio Bardellino in 1983
- Born: May 4, 1945; San Cipriano d'Aversa, Italy
- Disappeared: May 26, 1988 (aged 43); Armação dos Búzios, Brazil
- Status: Missing for 38 years, 4 months and 21 days
- Allegiance: Casalesi clan / Camorra

Antonio Bardellino (Italian pronunciation: [anˈtɔːnjo bardelˈliːno]; May 4, 1945 – May 26, 1988) was a powerful Camorrista and boss of the Casalesi clan, having a prominent role in the organized crime in the province of Caserta during the 1980s. He was one of the last of the old-style Camorra godfathers.

== Powerful Camorrista ==
Originally from San Cipriano d'Aversa in the Italian province of Caserta, Bardellino was an important Cosa Nostra affiliate in the region of Campania. "Bardellino was the reference point of all Camorra clans, even the ones that could not stand him. With his charisma he managed to maintain a certain equilibrium in Campania", according to the pentito Pasquale Galasso. He was the founder of the Casalesi clan, around which for almost a decade moved a united confederation of families (Schiavone, Bidognetti, Zagaria, Iovine, Venosa) rooted in a large territory which extended from southern Lazio through the agro aversano (countryside near Aversa), to Naples.

== Ties with Cosa Nostra ==
Bardellino had close and powerful contacts within the Sicilian Mafia, initially with the Porta Nuova family of Pippo Calò. He was one of the few Camorra bosses who were also initiated into Cosa Nostra. Together with Lorenzo Nuvoletta and Michele Zaza, he was sworn in to seal a pact on cigarette smuggling in 1975.

In contrast to the Nuvoletta brothers, who were allied with the Corleonesi headed by Luciano Leggio and Salvatore Riina, Bardellino was allied with Rosario Riccobono, Stefano Bontade, Gaetano Badalamenti, and Tommaso Buscetta, all heads of fallen Palermo families which were defeated by the Corleonesi in the Second Mafia War and forced to flee.

== Underworld rackets ==
It is believed that Bardellino was the initiator of the Casalesi clan in the area of Casal di Principe and San Cipriano d'Aversa, especially due to the transformation he implemented within the clan. The rituals of affiliation remained as well as the rate of murders, but the leap in quality was the continued infiltration of the legitimate economy with the proceeds of illicit drug trafficking. This was favoured by the 1980 Irpinia earthquake and the subsequent reconstruction, which prompted the families to create a consortium for their companies that performed the work of earth-moving and construction. Another factor was the great entrepreneurial ability of Bardellino himself. He owned a fish flour import-export business together with other clans, which in fact covered up a Brazilian cocaine smuggling operation. Besides trafficking cocaine, he was involved in the heroin trade with Lorenzo Nuvoletta and Ciro Mazzarella, supplying the Sicilian Mafia.

In the 1980s, Bardellino realized that cocaine, not heroin, would become the more profitable drug and organized a trafficking operation smuggling it from Latin America to Aversa via his front business. Heroin was smuggled as well, and shipments to the Gambino crime family were concealed inside espresso filters. When one shipment was intercepted by the authorities, Bardellino reportedly called John Gotti and told him; "Don't worry, now we're sending twice as much the other way".

== Nuova Famiglia ==
Bardellino was the main exponent of the Nuova Famiglia (NF), a confederation of clans that was formed to contrast the growing power of the predominant Nuova Camorra Organizzata (NCO), led by Raffaele Cutolo. The NF consisted of Bardellino, Michele Zaza (a Camorra boss with strong ties with Cosa Nostra), the Gionta clan (from Torre Annunziata), the Nuvoletta clan from Marano, the Alfieri clan of Saviano led by Carmine Alfieri, the Galasso clan of Poggiomarino (led by Pasquale Galasso), the Giuliano clan from Naples' quarter Forcella (led by Luigi Giuliano) and the Vollaro clan from Portici (led by Luigi Vollaro).

The resulting war between the NF and the NCO resulted in a large number of victims from both sides, and ended with the NCO's defeat and the victory of the NF. However, with Cutolo and the NCO out of the picture, the NF alliance soon disintegrated, with a war breaking out between the Bardellino and Nuvoletta clans towards the end of 1983.

== War with the Nuvolettas ==
While in the Second Mafia War the Corleonesi exterminated the Bontade-Buscetta-Inzerillo-Badalamenti faction, its effects were being felt on the Camorra. The Corleonesi boss, Salvatore Riina, mandated Lorenzo Nuvoletta to order the murder of Tommaso Buscetta. Nuvoletta, in turn, passed the order to Bardellino. The order was not brought to an end, because Bardellino had been good friends with Buscetta in Sicily, and had once shared the same house with Buscetta in Brazil when the latter was absconding. He also deeply distrusted the Nuvolettas and was unwilling to accept the supremacy of the Nuvoletta brothers with the interference of the Corleonesi. Bardellino's attitude soon marked him for death, and he would spend the last years of life in hiding outside Italy, including Spain, Brazil and Santo Domingo.

Towards the end of 1982, thanks to a tip off from the local police, Antonio Bardellino managed to evade capture in his Rio de Janeiro apartment. Despite this setback, a meeting was soon arranged between Bardellino and the Nuvolettas in Zurich, but Aniello Nuvoletta was arrested at the rendezvous. Many other leaders of the Nuvoletta clan would have been arrested had they not suffered a chance accident in northern Italy, near the Swiss border. Bardellino was arrested in Barcelona, Spain in November 1983, but he was inexplicably released on bail and disappeared soon afterwards.

== Victory ==
The clash with the Nuvoletta clan resulted in Bardellino's victory. An attack was made at the Nuvoletta family's farm in Marano which resulted in the death of Ciro Nuvoletta, one of the brothers. Two months later, events culminated with an attack at Torre Annunziata, an area infamous for its illegal activities, which led to the massacre of eight members of the Gionta clan allied with the Nuvolettas at the Circolo dei Pescatori (fisherman's club). Another twenty four were wounded. This episode was known as the Torre Annunziata massacre in the local press, and is perhaps the worst gangland massacre to ever take place in Italy.

This victory further allowed Antonio Bardellino to expand his sphere of control and influence to include almost the entire province of Caserta and Naples. In spite of being a fugitive sought by Interpol, Bardellino could exercise his power and coordinate criminal activities unhindered, but the disagreements came with the Casalesi itself.

== Assassination ==
According to the official version of the story, on May 26, 1988, Antonio Bardellino was murdered by his right-hand man, Mario Iovine in his Brazilian home at Búzios, a beach side resort for the rich and famous in the State of Rio de Janeiro, as part of an internal feud within the Casalesi. However, this story has never been verified because his body was never found and the alleged assassin, Iovine, was himself murdered in Portugal in 1991 while using a phone booth. These circumstances have fuelled a legend that Bardellino is still alive, and has left power in the hands of the other families within the Casalesi clan in order to ensure the survival of his family.

When his old friend, Tommaso Buscetta who later became a pentito was asked about the status of Bardellino during a testimony before the Antimafia Commission, he replied: "Is it already obvious that Bardellino died? I do not know, but I do not believe that he is dead." After the news of Bardellino's death spread, his family left their homes and native areas to take refuge in Formia where they still reside. After the disappearance of Antonio Bardellino, the five families (Schiavone, Iovine, Bidognetti, De Falco and Zagaria) took control, each with their own army.

His former ally Umberto Ammaturo, who turned state witness (pentito), also said Bardellino was still alive when he gave a rare interview to La Repubblica newspaper in May 2010.

== See also ==
- List of people who disappeared mysteriously: post-1970
