= List of victims of the Camorra =

This list of victims of the Camorra includes people who have been killed by the Neapolitan Camorra while opposing its rule. It does not include people killed in internal conflicts of the Camorra itself.

== 1980s ==
=== 1982 ===
- April 1 – Aldo Semerari, a 58-year-old Italian criminologist, psychiatrist and political diplomat, is murdered on the orders of Umberto Ammaturo and Pupetta Maresca.
- July 2 – Salvatore Nuvoletta, a 20-year-old Italian Carabinieri was murdered by the Casalesi clan, under false suspicion of having taken part in a firefight in which clan member Mario Schiavone was killed.

=== 1985 ===
- September 23 – Giancarlo Siani, a 26-year-old crime reporter for Il Mattino, the principal newspaper of Naples, is murdered by the Nuvoletta clan for his investigation of the Camorra.

== 1990s ==
=== 1994 ===
- March 19 – Giuseppe Diana, a priest in Casal di Principe who had been known as a campaigning cleric since he issued a letter in late 1992 urging his parishioners to shun the Camorra.

== 2000s ==
=== 2002 ===
- February 18 – Federico Del Prete, a trade unionist, for opposing extortion, known as "pizzo", by the La Torre clan of Mondragone.

=== 2004 ===
- November 21 – Gelsomina Verde, a 21-year-old woman, tortured and killed in an effort to make her disclose the whereabouts of her former Camorra boyfriend.
- March 27 – Annalisa Durante, a 14-year-old girl killed in the Forcella quarter of Naples, during a clash between two rival Camorra clans.

=== 2008 ===
- May 2 – Umberto Bidognetti was murdered in Castel Volturno by the Casalesi clan, in punishment for his son Domenico's collaboration with the authorities.
- May 16 – Domenico Noviello, a businessman murdered by the Casalesi clan for refusing to pay pizzo or extortion money.

== 2010s ==
=== 2016 ===
- June 7 – Ciro Colonna, 19 years old, killed along with Raffaele Cepparulo (considered the target of the assassins), by the Rinaldi and De Luca Bossa clans in the Naples neighborhood of Ponticelli.
