= Gomorrah (film) =

2008 crime film directed by Matteo Garrone

- Italian theatrical release poster
- Italian: Gomorra
- Directed by: Matteo Garrone
- Screenplay by: Matteo Garrone; Roberto Saviano; Maurizio Braucci; Ugo Chiti; Gianni Di Gregorio; Massimo Gaudioso
- Based on: Gomorrah by Roberto Saviano
- Produced by: Domenico Procacci
- Starring: Toni Servillo; Gianfelice Imparato; Maria Nazionale; Salvatore Cantalupo; Gigio Morra; Salvatore Abruzzese; Marco Macor; Ciro Petrone; Carmine Paternoster
- Cinematography: Marco Onorato
- Edited by: Marco Spoletini
- Music by: Giovanni Guardi; Robert Del Naja
- Production company: Rai Cinema; Fandango
- Distributed by: 01 Distribution
- Release dates: 16 May 2008 (Italy); 11 September 2008 (TIFF)
- Running time: 137 minutes
- Country: Italy
- Languages: Neapolitan; Italian
- Budget: €5.9 million
- Box office: $46.7 million

Gomorrah (Italian: Gomorra) is a 2008 Italian crime drama film directed by Matteo Garrone, based on the non-fiction book of the same name by Roberto Saviano, who also collaborated in the screenplay. It depicts the Casalesi clan, a crime syndicate within the Camorra — a traditional criminal organization based in Naples and Caserta, in the southern Italian region of Campania.

The film was released in Italy on 16 May 2008, and premiered in North America at the Toronto International Film Festival on 11 September 2008, followed by release in New York City and Los Angeles on 13 February 2009. It received critical acclaim, winning the Grand Prix at the 2008 Cannes Film Festival and seven David di Donatello Awards, including Best Film and Best Director (for Garrone). It also won five awards at the 2008 European Film Awards. Although selected as the Italian entry for the Best Foreign Language Film at the 81st Academy Awards, it was not nominated.

A 2014 TV series of the same name is loosely based on the same book, but is otherwise unrelated to the film.

== Plot ==
In Naples in 2004, some gangsters are relaxing in a tanning salon. An assassination occurs between clans of the Di Lauro Camorra syndicate which rule Scampia–Secondigliano, and triggers the Scampia feud, between members of the Di Lauro syndicate and the so-called scissionisti (secessionists), who are led by Raffaele Amato, brother of two of the men killed in the opening scene.

The film intertwines five separate stories of people whose lives are touched by organized crime against the backdrop of the ongoing feud.

Don Ciro
Don Ciro is a timid middleman who distributes money to the families of imprisoned Di Lauro clan members. After the feud develops within the clan, he is ambushed by a pair of angry secessionists during a delivery. Fearing for his life, he later offers to defect to their side. They refuse his offer, and tell Ciro that he has to "pay" for his life by selling some of his former associates. He leads them to the location where he is given the money for distribution. The pair raid the place, killing everyone but Ciro, and take most of the money, leaving some cash on the table for Ciro. Ciro, spattered with blood, walks off past several bodies to an uncertain future.

Totò
Totò is a 13-year-old grocery delivery boy who witnesses some drug dealers abandon a bag of drugs and a gun while evading the police in the Vele of Scampia. He returns the items to the gang, and asks to join. His initiation in a cavern consists of him being shot while wearing a bulletproof vest as a test of courage. As the feud intensifies, families in the neighborhood whose loyalties are suspect are ordered to move out or suffer violence; Totò's fellow gang members receive similar threats. Later, while hanging out with his gang in the streets of Scampia, one of his gang is killed in a drive-by shooting. The gang members decide to stand their ground and exact violent retribution by selecting a woman, Maria, as their next victim, as her son has joined a clan of Secondigliano secessionists. Totò, who has delivered groceries to Maria, is forced to lure her out of her apartment, where his comrades kill her.

Roberto
Roberto is a graduate who works in waste management. His boss, Franco, provides a low-cost toxic waste disposal service that allows northern industrialists to dispose of materials like chromium and asbestos in the countryside of southern Italy. Franco and Roberto orchestrate the illegal disposal of the waste at abandoned quarries and other environmentally-sensitive sites. During one such operation, a drum of toxic chemicals is accidentally spilled on a driver. Franco refuses to call an ambulance, and hires children to drive the trucks when the workers refuse to continue their work. Later, Franco and Roberto meet a family of farmers who, desperate to extinguish their debts, decide to allow the burial of chemical substances in their countryside. An elderly farmer gifts Roberto a basket of peaches, but Franco later tells him to throw them away because they are contaminated. Roberto then decides to quit his job and tells Franco he cannot bring himself to poison the earth, to which Franco says that he should not think he is the better man, because thanks to men like them Italy was able to join the European Union by solving problems others had caused, and allowed people to repay their debts. Roberto walks alone on a desolate countryside road.

Pasquale
Pasquale is an haute couture tailor who works for Iavarone, a garment factory owner with ties to the Camorra. Pasquale takes a night-job training Chinese garment workers. As they are competing with Camorra-controlled firms, the Chinese drive him to and from work in the trunk of their car. His secret work is discovered, and his Chinese associates are killed in a drive-by shooting. He survives the attack, but resigns his job. Later, working as a truck driver, he is in a transport café where he spots Scarlett Johansson on TV wearing one of his dresses. He smiles wryly as he drives away.

Marco and Ciro
Marco and Ciro are two young wannabe-gangsters who try to operate their own small racket independently of the local clan. Impressed by mafia portrayals from Hollywood movies, they quote lines and spontaneously reenact scenes from Scarface in Walter Schiavone's villa while dropping references to Tony Montana, Miami, and Colombian drug cartels. Their first score is robbing African immigrants during a drug purchase at the Hotel Boomerang, Castel Volturno. The word of the incident gets to the local mob chieftain, who summons them and warns them under threat of violence not to repeat such behavior in the future. Ignoring him completely, they spy Camorra gangsters hiding a stash of weapons. They steal the weapons and amuse themselves by firing off rounds by the banks of a Regi Lagni canal estuary in the marshland. Once they run out of money, they use their guns to rob a video arcade, and spend their stolen funds at a strip club. The gangsters, angered, find them and threaten to kill them if they do not return the weapons within a day. The pair prove stubborn. Zio Vittorio, one of the local gangsters, approaches them in a bar with an offer to work for him. He offers them €10,000 if they return the weapons and murder Peppe 'O Cavallaro. They accept the contract, which turns out to be a trap: they are ambushed and killed by Giovanni, Bernardino, Vittorio and others at the location of their supposed target, an abandoned beach resort next to Regi Lagni canal estuary. The last scene shows their dead bodies being carried away by a front end loader.

== Cast ==
- Toni Servillo as Franco
- Gianfelice Imparato as Don Ciro
- Maria Nazionale as Maria
- Salvatore Cantalupo as Pasquale
- Gigio Morra as Iavarone
- Salvatore Abruzzese as Totò
- Marco Macor as Marco
- Ciro Petrone as Ciro
- Carmine Paternoster as Roberto
- Giovanni Venosa as Don Giovanni
- Vittorio Russo as Zio ('Uncle') Vittorio
- Bernardino Terracciano as Zio ('Uncle') Bernardino
- Simone Sacchettino as Simone
- Salvatore Ruocco as Boxer
- Vincenzo Fabricino as Pitbull
- Vincenzo Altamura as Gaetano
- Italo Renda as Italo
- Francesco Pirozzi as Michele
- Antonio Aiello as Farrel
- Vincenzo Caso as Enzo
- Salvatore Russo as O'Lungo
- Antonio Spina as O'Zi Bi
- Francesco Paesano as O'Chiatto
- Leonardo Caforio as Gigante
- Luigi Caputo as Luigi
- Salvatore Striano as Salvo
- Carlo Del Sorbo as Don Carlo
- Vincenzo Bombolo as Bombolone
- Claudio De Lucia as Paolo
- Alfonso Santagata as Dante
- Zhang Ronghua as Xian
- Long Guoquine as Long
- Maria De Fortis Nadi as Serena
- Anna Sarnelli as Totò's mother

== Reception ==
=== Box office ===
In the opening weekend, the film was the most watched in Italy, with a collection of €1,825,643. The film grossed €10.2 million in Italy, making it the top 10 grossing movie in the 2007–08 season. The film made a further $36.5 million internationally.

=== Critical reception ===
Gomorrah received critical acclaim. Review aggregator website Rotten Tomatoes gives the film a score of 90% based on reviews from 155 critics, with an average score of 8/10. The website's critical consensus states: "Portraying organised crime with an unflinching realism, this gritty and searing Italian crime masterpiece pulls no punches". Metacritic gave the film a weighted score of 87/100, based on 30 critics, which it ranks as "universal acclaim".

In reviewing Garrone's film based on the book, Christoph Huber wrote: "With its interest in moving beyond the categories of novel or non-fiction, Saviano's work has been identified as part of a heterogeneous strain of national literature, subsumed as the New Italian Epic. A term that certainly isn't disgraced by Gomorrah, the film." Manohla Dargis of the New York Times stated, "part of what's bracing about Gomorrah, and makes it feel different from so many American crime movies, is both its deadly serious take on violence and its global understanding of how far and wide the mob's tentacles reach, from high fashion to the very dirt." Jonah Weiner of Slate stated, "Gomorrah is a deeply moralizing film, brooking no ethical ambiguity or mitigating factors in its hellish vision of organized crime." Filmmaker Martin Scorsese, who appreciated the "despair" and "frankness" of the film, allowed his name to be used for marketing purposes when the film was released in the United States through a presentation credit on promotional materials.

=== Top 10 lists ===
The film appeared on several critics' top ten lists of the best films of 2008.

- 2nd – Josh Rosenblatt, The Austin Chronicle
- 5th – Kenneth Turan, Los Angeles Times (tied with Happy-Go-Lucky)
- 5th – Lisa Schwarzbaum, Entertainment Weekly
- 5th – Marc Savlov, The Austin Chronicle
- 6th – A.O. Scott, The New York Times
- 6th – Wesley Morris, The Boston Globe
- 7th – Marjorie Baumgarten, The Austin Chronicle
- 10th – Empire

=== Awards and nominations ===
The movie premiered in North America at the Toronto International Film Festival on 11 September 2008. It was nominated for the Palme d'Or and won the Grand Prix at the Cannes Film Festival in 2008. It won the ARRI-Zeiss Award at the Munich Film Festival. The film was selected by the Associazione Nazionale Industrie Cinematografiche Audiovisive e Multimediali to represent Italy in contention for Best Foreign Language Film at the 81st Academy Awards. Despite the earlier success at Cannes, and defying expectations, it failed to be short-listed. On 11 December Gomorrah received a Golden Globe Awards nomination for Best Foreign Language Film. Gomorrah won five awards at the 2008 European Film Awards, including Best European Film in Copenhagen on 6 December 2008.

The film received seven awards at L'accademia del Cinema Italiano 2009 David di Donatello Awards. It was also nominated for the Grand Prix of the Belgian Syndicate of Cinema Critics.

=== Internet meme ===
In November 2022 a post on the social media site Tumblr went viral which featured a photograph of a pair of "knockoff" boots with a tag including text likely intended to reference Gomorrah, with the film's name misspelled as "Goncharov" and Garrone's name misspelled as "Matteo JWHJ0715". The viral post quickly spawned a fandom around the non-existent film Goncharov, with users collaborating to establish a plot for the film, create fan art, and create posts purporting to analyze Goncharov's thematic material.

== Historical basis ==
The film, following the book on which it is based, portrays events identifiably similar to actual historical ones; for example, the Scampia feud. In the film's credits, the filmmakers thank the districts of Scampia and Torre del Greco, as well as the Carabinieri of nearby Boscoreale: these three suburban areas around the Bay of Naples feature cityscapes appropriate for filming this story.

The scene at the truck stop where Pasquale sees Scarlett Johansson on TV wearing one of the tailor's dresses is based on a portion of the book where Angelina Jolie wore a counterfeit dress to the Oscars. Garrone could not obtain that footage from the Academy and instead used footage of Johansson at the Venice Film Festival in 2006 – even though press reports indicate hers was a vintage gown.

== Alleged and documented connections to the Camorra ==
Oreste Spagnuolo, member of the Casalesi clan and main perpetrator of the Castel Volturno massacre, has alleged that Garrone paid a pizzo of 20,000 euros to proceed with the film. He also insinuates that Terracciano was cast as a part of this deal.

=== Cast members arrested ===
Many amateur and non-professional actors from the area were cast in the film. Several are known to have actual involvement in Camorra clans and have been arrested on various occasions since the film's release, including:

- Bernardino Terracciano – extortion (2008), sentenced to life for murder in 2016
- Giovanni Venosa – drug trafficking, extortion (2008), sentenced to 13 years in 2009
- Salvatore Russo – drug dealing (2016, 2018)
- Salvatore Abruzzese – drug dealing (2021)

Similar accusations and arrests have surrounded the subsequent TV series.

== Soundtrack ==
1. "Ma si vene stasera" – Alessio
2. "La Nostra Storia" – Raffaello
3. "Brava gente" – Nino D'Angelo
4. "Must Pray" – Pieter Vercampt
5. "Macchina 50" – Rosario Miraggio
6. "Ragione e sentimento" – Maria Nazionale
7. "Un giornio d'Amore" – Daniele Stefani
8. "Sadeness (Part 1)" – Enigma
9. "Esageratamente" – Anthony
10. "O' schiavo e o' re" – Nino D'Angelo
11. "Xiao Cheng Gu Shi" – Teresa Teng
12. "Viento 'e mare (feat. Maria Nazionale)" – Matthew Herbert
13. "L'amica di mia moglie" – Tommy Riccio
14. "Finchè 'o sole me vo'" – Maria Nazionale
15. "Herculaneum" – Robert Del Naja

== See also ==
- List of submissions to the 81st Academy Awards for Best Foreign Language Film
- List of Italian submissions for the Academy Award for Best Foreign Language Film
- Sodoma: The Dark Side Of Gomorrah, a parody of Gomorrah
