= Carmine Schiavone =

Carmine Schiavone (20 July 1943 in Casal di Principe – 22 February 2015 in Viterbo) was a former member of the Casalesi clan from Casal di Principe in the province of Caserta. He was a cousin of former Camorra superboss Francesco Schiavone and became a pentito collaborating with Italian Justice. He was the chief witness against the Casalesi clan during the Spartacus Maxi trial that culminated in sixteen senior Casalesi figures being sentenced to life imprisonment, among them Francesco Bidognetti, Michele Zagaria and Antonio Iovine. After living in the Witness Protection Program for some years, Schiavione retired to live in the province of Viterbo, with his wife and two children.
