= Bidognetti =

Bidognetti is a surname. Notable people with the surname include:

- Francesco Bidognetti (born 1951), Italian camorrista
- Domenico Bidognetti, Italian crime figure
