= Giuseppe Diana =

Italian Catholic priest and murder victim (1958–1994)

Servant of God Giuseppe Diana
- Portrait of Don Peppino Diana
- Born: 4 July 1958; Casal di Principe, Caserta, Italy
- Died: 19 March 1994 (aged 35); Casal di Principe, Caserta, Italy
- Cause of death: Murder by gunshots
- Venerated in: Roman Catholic Church

Giuseppe Diana (Italian pronunciation: [dʒuˈzɛppe ˈdjaːna]; 4 July 1958 – 19 March 1994), also known as Father Peppino, was an Italian Catholic priest, writer, and scout in Casal di Principe. He was a staunch opponent to the Camorra, a Mafia-type criminal society, and called on others to resist them and their actions. In 1994, Diana was murdered by the Camorra at the age of 35 while he was preparing Mass.

== Defying the Camorra ==
In the mid-1980s, he set up a welcome centre for African immigrants in Campania to stop them from being recruited by the Camorra, in a direct challenge to their business practices.

On Christmas 1991, he published a letter urging his parishioners to shun the Camorra. The letter entitled "For the love of my people I will not stay silent", called on the church to resist the Camorra's rule, which he called "a form of terrorism". He also denounced the Casalesi clans' business practices: "Extortion that has left our region with no potential for development; kickbacks of 20 per cent on construction projects; illegal drug trafficking, which has created gangs of marginalised youth and unskilled workers at the beck and call of criminal organisations."

== Murder ==
In 1994 he testified in an investigation of ties linking the Camorra, politicians and businessmen after the Government's decision to suspend the local council in Casal Di Principe because of its links to the Camorra. He had threatened to stop administering sacraments to camorristi, refusing to marry them. He also sided with the newly elected mayor of Casal di Principe, who was trying to prevent firms connected to the Camorra from tendering for public contracts.

On 19 March 1994, he was shot twice in the head in the Church of San Nicola di Bari in the town of Casal di Principe while preparing to offer a Mass for the feast of Saint Joseph.

== Legacy ==
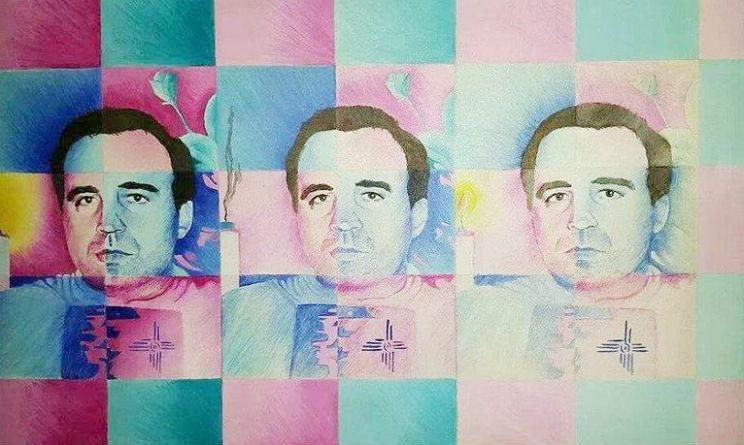
Giuseppe Diana

In his book Gomorrah, writer Roberto Saviano, who personally knew Father Diana, dedicated a chapter to the priest. The title of the book comes from a letter by Diana, "time has come to stop being a Gomorrah." "He decided to take an interest in the dynamics of power and not merely its corollary suffering," Saviano wrote. "He didn’t want merely to clean the wound but to understand the mechanisms of the metastasis, to prevent the cancer from spreading, to block the source of whatever was turning his home into a gold mine of capital with an abundance of cadavers."

On 20 March 2014, Pope Francis gave a speech urging the mafia to change their ways and repent, and threatened them with excommunication. After the speech, he donned a priestly ceremonial garment once worn by Diana.

== See also ==
- Streetwise priest
