= Salvatore Cantalupo =

Italian actor (1959–2018)

- Born: 8 July 1959; Naples, Italy
- Died: 13 August 2018 (aged 59); Monserrato, Italy
- Occupation: Actor
- Years active: 1998–2018
- Height: 1.70 m (5 ft 7 in)

Salvatore Cantalupo (8 July 1959 – 13 August 2018) was an Italian actor.

Very active especially in the theater, Cantalupo became known to the general public and the media thanks to the 2008 film Gomorrah directed by Matteo Garrone and based on the novel by Roberto Saviano, in which Cantalupo played the role of Pasquale, a tailor who worked in high fashion, but gets exploited by the Camorra. He was also well known for the role of mayoral candidate Giovanni De Santis, rival of Cetto La Qualunque, in the satyrical film Qualunquemente.

He died on 13 August 2018, at the age of 59, after a short illness.

== Partial filmography ==
- Rehearsals for War (1998)
- Appassionate (1999)
- Gomorrah (2008)
- Fort Apache Napoli (2009)
- The White Space (2009
- Bets and Wedding Dresses (2009)
- We Believed (2010)
- Qualunquemente (2011)
- Heavenly Body (2011)
- Song'e Napule (2013)
- See You Tomorrow (2013)
- Leopardi (2014)
- Perez. (2014)
- Per amor vostro (2015)
- Tenderness (2017)
