= Giuseppe Setola =

Italian criminal (born 1970)

- January 2009 mugshot of Setola
- Born: November 5, 1970 (age 55)
- Occupation: Boss of the Casalesi clan
- Spouse: Stefania Martinelli
- Status: Incarcerated
- Conviction: Murder
- Penalty: Life imprisonment

Giuseppe Setola (Italian pronunciation: [dʒuˈzɛppe ˈseːtola]; born November 5, 1970) is an Italian Camorrista and former boss of the Casalesi clan from Caserta. In 2008, he was included on the list of most wanted fugitives in Italy, until his arrest on January 14, 2009, in Mignano Monte Lungo. Setola allegedly headed a squad of killers, and was said to have ordered or carried out 18 murders throughout the latter half of 2008. Police began a massive manhunt against Setola in response to the murders of six West African immigrants in Castel Volturno.

On January 12, 2009, Setola evaded arrest by escaping into the sewers through a secret trapdoor during a police raid on his hideout. He was arrested two days later after leading police on a rooftop chase. Setola is currently serving a life imprisonment sentence for murder. He was featured in Gomorrah, the best-selling Roberto Saviano book about the Camorra in Campania.

== Criminal career ==
Giuseppe Setola was a Camorrista and boss of the Casalesi clan from Caserta. He became considered one of the most wanted fugitives in Italy. He was featured in Gomorrah, the 2006 best-selling book by author Roberto Saviano about the Campanian mafia. Following the book's release, authorities said the Camorra asked Setola to kill Saviano. Although the alleged hit request never took place, Setola was said to have purchased a detonator and explosives for the job.

Authorities claimed Setola ordered or carried out 18 murders between May and December 2008, during which time he allegedly led a Casalesi squad of killers, who reportedly sought to eliminate rivals and punish businessmen who refused to pay protection money to the Camorra. The squad was formed during a time of apparent power struggles within the Camorra crime syndicate. Setola was convicted of murder and sentenced to life in prison, but was placed on house arrest in the spring of 2008 when he received a doctor's certificate that he was suffering from an eye infection. Setola escaped and went underground almost immediately after being placed on house arrest. Prosecutors later opened a probe into how Setola organized the escape.

In May 2008, Setola and fellow Casalesi member Gianluca Bidognetti allegedly disguised themselves as anti-Mafia police and planned to kill relatives of a clan woman who had been cooperating with police. Setola and Bidognetti, along with others in disguise, allegedly convinced the informant's sister and niece to come onto the streets, but only succeeded in wounding one of them. Bidognetti was arrested in November 2008 for attempted murder in connection to the incident. Setola was also said to be responsible for the murder of a gambling arcade owner in a coastal town neighboring Caserta. Setola has been said to have driven a motorbike during some of his alleged hits.

== Manhunt ==
Setola was accused of masterminding the September 18 drive-by shootings of six West African immigrants in Castel Volturno, which sparked riots and prompted the deployment of 500 soldiers. More than 100 shots were fired during the killings, which were considered among the largest and bloodiest massacres in recent years. Investigators claimed Setola orchestrated the killings to punish the Africans for getting involved in drug trafficking and impeding on the Casalesi clan's business. In response to the killings, Interior Minister Roberto Maroni said the Casalesi clan has "declared war on the Italian state". Police began a manhunt for Setola and the rest of his gang. In October 2008, Oreste Spagnuolo, a member of Setola's alleged killing squad, started assisting police in their mission to arrest Setola and his other accomplices. The next month, police arrested a Carabinieri paramilitary police officer for providing information to Setola about police operations. Franco Roberti, a Naples anti-Mafia police officer, said in November 2008, "Setola is without doubt the brains behind the Casalesi campaign. We are working to flush him out. The circle is closing around him."

In January 2009, Setola later sent a letter to a local newspaper denying responsibility for his alleged crimes. He also wrote that he was blind in one eye, a claim that has been met with skepticism by the press, and disputed by police. Setola was eventually found to be sharing a house in Trentola-Ducenta with his wife, Stefania Martinelli, and another suspected mobster. On January 12, 2009, about 50 Carabinieri officers surrounded Setola's hideout in Trentola-Ducenta. As they raided the hideout, Setola and his bodyguard escaped by slipping through a trap door and crawling a mile through a labyrinthine sewer system. The floor and door were secured through a sophisticated locking system, and police said the sewer layout had been "studied very well". Setola reemerged from a manhole outside a dairy, where he robbed a woman of her car and drove away. Police officers and divers eventually chased Setola through the sewers, but did not find him. Martinelli was placed under arrest and questioned by police after weapons were found in the house. Later that night, the prosecutors leading the hunt for Setola received a threatening letter that included five rounds of live ammunition.

== Arrest ==
Setola was arrested on January 14, 2009 in Mignano Monte Lungo, where he was seeking treatment for a wrist injury he suffered during his escape two days earlier. Police were tipped off to his location. Setola led authorities through a rooftop chase before placing him under arrest. He was confined in the 41-bis prison regime, the strictest and most restrictive Italian prison regime, which included solitary confinement and continuous surveillance in a maximum-security jail. His cell included only a bed, a table and a stool, without access to television, radio or newspapers. Following Setola's arrest, the Casalesi clan was said to have been taken over by Michele Bidognetti, who himself was arrested in April 2009. Setola's older brother, Pasquale, was also in prison as of July 2009.

In April 2011, the Court in Santa Maria Capua Vetere (Caserta) convicted Setola, Davide Granato, Alessandro Cirillo, Giovanni Letizia to life imprisonment and Antonio Alluce to 23 years for the Castel Volturno massacre. The Court recognized the existence of aggravating circumstances such as racial hatred and terrorist purposes.

== See also ==
- List of fugitives from justice who disappeared
