= Nicola Cosentino =

Italian politician (born 1959)

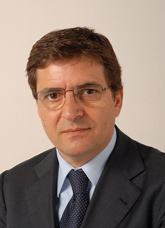
Cosentino in 2006

Nicola Cosentino (born 2 January 1959) is an Italian politician. Nicknamed "Nick 'o mericano", he was a member of the Chamber of Deputies from 9 May 1996 to 14 March 2013 for Forza Italia and The People of Freedom in four legislatures, as well as undersecretary of state at the Ministry of Economy and Finance from 12 May 2008 to 14 July 2010 in the fourth Berlusconi government. In 2023, Italy's Supreme Court of Cassation confirmed his conviction for external complicity in mafia association.

== Early life and family ==
Cosentino was born in Casal di Principe, one of Camorra's strongholds near Naples, in the Campania region. He is a distant relative of the Casalesi clan member Giuseppe Russo.

== Career ==
Cosentino, a member of the Italian Socialist Democratic Party, was a municipal councillor in 1978−1980, then a provincial councillor from 1980 to 1995. In that year, he was elected to the Chamber of Deputies for Forza Italia. In 2005, he ran for the presidency of the province of Caserta but was defeated by the centre-left coalition candidate Sandro De Franciscis. Cosentino was re-elected to the Chamber of Deputies in April 2008 for The People of Freedom, Silvio Berlusconi's centre-right coalition party. In September 2008, through the confession of Camorra boss Gaetano Vassallo, he was implicated in a criminal scheme that involved the illegal treatment of toxic wastes in exchange of a monthly sum of €50,000. In 2009, magistrates Naples' anti-mafia commission sent to the Chamber of Deputies the request of arrest for Cosentino but its commission refused.

In 2010, Cosentino was involved in a scandal related to wind energy systems in Sardinia, which led to the discovery of the new P2 or P3 (a reference to the Propaganda Due, a secret Masonic lodge of the 1970s−early 1980s, of which Berlusconi was a member). He was called in by several entrepreneurs and right-wing politicians. According to the Ordinary Court in Rome, the accuses were pressuring the Constitutional Court of Italy to consider as legitimate the Lodo Alfano, a law that would have saved Berlusconi, the then Italian prime minister, from several of his trials; it was declared invalid; supporting the readmission of the For Lombardy regional list in the regional elections in Lombardy (the list had been banned due to use of fake signatures on the petitions that are required for a political party, or list of candidates to be placed on the ballot); favouring the appointment of Alfonso Marra in the Court of Appeal in Milan; and supporting the candidature of Cosentino as president of Campania through a smear campaign against the other right-wing candidate. On 14 July 2010, Cosentino resigned as undersecretary of the Italian Ministry of Economy, although he retained the role as regional coordinator of The People of Freedom in Campania, a position he held until 21 January 2013.

On 27 April 2023, Cosentino was definitively sentenced to 10 years in prison for external complicity in mafia association.
