= Antonio Iovine =

Italian criminal

Mugshot of Antonio Iovine, the boss of the Casalesi clan.

Antonio Iovine (Italian pronunciation: [anˈtɔːnjo ˈjoːvine]; born September 20, 1964, in San Cipriano d'Aversa) is a powerful Italian Camorrista and one of the bosses of the Casalesi clan from Casal di Principe in the province of Caserta between Naples and Lazio. His nickname is 'o ninno ("the baby"), because of his baby face when he was made a capo at a very young age.

== Fugitive ==
He has been on the "most wanted list" of the Italian ministry of the Interior since 1996 and since 2002 for murder and other crimes, until his arrest in November 2010. On August 10, 1999, an international warrant was issued against him, to be arrested for extradition. He is close to Francesco Schiavone alias Sandokan, the head of the Casalesi clan. Iovine's daughter, Filomena (Milly), is engaged to be married with Ivanoe Schiavone, the son of Sandokan.

== Business mind ==
Antonio Iovine is considered the ‘minister of garbage’ of the Camorra. In Campania, the Camorra controls the entire cycle of garbage disposal, running the dumps, waste transport companies and other businesses, raking in US$880 million a year, according to Anti-mafia prosecutors. Investigators suspect Antonio Iovine's ability to evade arrests is thanks in part to mob infiltration of local government.

He is regarded as the business mind of the organisation. Iovine is also considered to be the one behind the clan’s expansion beyond the boundaries of Campania. Investigators believe that Iovine was the Camorra's deal-maker, recycling the illicit revenue from illegal activities such as drug trafficking and protection rackets, into the legal economy, in particular the cement business.

== Trial in absentia and later arrest ==
He was sentenced to life on June 19, 2008, after 10-year trial—named the Spartacus Trial—against 36 members of the Casalesi clan charged with a string of murders and other crimes. When still a fugitive boss, Iovine and his close ally, Michele Zagaria, were considered to be in charge of the Casalesi clan. Zagara was arrested December 7, 2011.

Iovine was arrested on November 17, 2010, in Casal di Principe, in a small villa in Casal di Principe, the gang's heartland north of Naples. He was unarmed and, after a first attempt to get away over a terrace, offered no resistance. Crime writer Roberto Saviano, who following the publication of his bestselling book Gomorrah about the Camorra has been threatened and needs a permanent police escort since 2006, said about the arrest: “I’ve been waiting for this day for 14 years. Antonio Iovine’s arrest is a fundamental step forward in the fight against organised crime. Iovine is an entrepreneur gang boss, capable of managing hundreds of millions of euros. I hope that a thorough clear-out will now be possible."

Following three years of careful pressuring by prosecutors, Iovine decided to become an informant (pentito) and collaborate with magistrates on May 22, 2014. His detailed knowledge of the Casalesi clan's connections to politicians, civil servants and businessmen, and how the clan conducted its business transactions, will have deep ramifications in Italy and "an entire generation" of accomplishes risks being "swept away". Saviano went as far as saying that it "will change the course of history in our country." Iovine's decision to become a government witness might have been caused by the harsh 41 bis prison regime in an isolated high-security prison unit as part of his life imprisonment sentence.
