= Mario Caterino =

Italian Camorrista and member in the Casalesi clan

Mug shot of Mario Caterino.

Mario Caterino (Italian pronunciation: [ˈmaːrjo kateˈriːno]; born 14 June 1957 in Casal di Principe) is an Italian Camorrista and member in the Casalesi clan from Casal di Principe in the province of Caserta between Naples and Salerno. He was on the "most wanted list" of the Italian ministry of the Interior since 2005, for murder and membership in the Camorra, until he was arrested on 2 May 2011 in Casal di Principe.

He received a life sentence at the Spartacus Trial against the Casalesi clan.

== See also ==
- List of fugitives from justice who disappeared
