= Francesco Bidognetti =

Italian criminal

Mugshot of Francesco Bidognetti, taken after his arrest in 1993.

Francesco Bidognetti (born January 21, 1951, in Casal di Principe) is a powerful Italian Camorrista. He is the chief lieutenant of Francesco Schiavone, boss of the Casalesi clan from Casal di Principe in the province of Caserta, and head of the Bidognetti clan, one of the five clans which make up the Casalesi. He is known as "'Cicciott' 'e Mezzanotte'" (Neapolitan for Midnight Frankie).

== Biography ==
=== Waste disposal king ===
The Bidognetti and Tavoletta clans are very strong in the northern towns of Caserta province. They operate several illegal dumps between Naples and Caserta. Tonnes of dangerous waste from northern and central Italy are planted in the dumps, as well as toxic wastes from factories, hospitals and cemeteries. As such, Bidognetti is considered by Italian law enforcement to be the boss of the waste disposal arm of the clan.

Bidognetti's lover, Angela Barra ruled the territory of Teverola and was the main conduit of all the political and economic alliances of the Casalesi Clan. In 1990, Bidognetti ordered the medical doctor Gennaro Falco's killing, for having not taken proper care of his wife by failing to diagnose her with cancer in time.

His nephew Gaetano Cerci is believed to be the key link between the clan and Licio Gelli, head of the defunct P2 masonic lodge. Many tapped telephone conversations by the Roman police proved that Cerci stayed several times at Gelli's house in Villa Wanda, near Arezzo. In 1993, Villa Wanda was searched, on orders of the Naples public prosecutor, but police failed to find the computer discs that they were looking for.

=== Wife turns informant ===
Anna Carrino, Bidognetti's wife was arrested in November 2007 and charged with passing messages from her imprisoned husband to his subordinates on the outside. She subsequently became a pentito and began giving away information that resulted in a number of major raids aimed at suspected members of the Camorra. She also provided information that led to the arrest of 52 Casalesi clan members in April 2008. Among those arrested was Bidognetti's son, Raffaele. Anna was moved to in a top-security jail after the Casalesi put a million-pound contract on her. The two scion of Francesco Bidognetti, Aniello and Raffaele, hit recently by an order of the harsh 416-bis prion regime.

=== Life imprisonment ===
In October 2003, Bidognetti and his son Aniello were indicted for the murder of doctor Gennaro Falco in the town of Parete. Two weeks later, Casalesi clan members Sebastiano Caterino and Umberto De Falco were murdered. Finally in June 2008, Bidognetti, Schiavone and 14 other Casalesi bosses were sentenced to life imprisonment in the Spartacus maxi-trial. Michele Zagaria and Antonio Iovine, two other Casalesi bosses, got the same sentence and were arrested on 7 December 2011 and 17 November 2010 respectively.

The 10-year legal trial, named as such in recognition of the need to fight a revolution in the Casalesi's territory, charged 36 members of the clan with a string of murders and other crimes. All were found guilty and 16 sentenced to life imprisonment. More than 500 witnesses testified in the trial which saw the heaviest penalties ever for organised crime with a total of 700 years of imprisonment. Over the course of the initial trial and the appeal, five people involved in the case were murdered, including an interpreter. A judge and two journalists were threatened with death.

In March 2008, through his lawyers in the courtroom, Francesco Bidognetti accused the prosecutor of the Dda, Antonio Cantone of being unduly influenced by the pentiti and the anti-Mafia journalists, Rosaria Capacchione, of the newspaper "Il Mattino ", and Roberto Saviano, author of the best-selling book Gommora, which deals with the criminal activities of the Casalesi clan. His lawyer further demanded the transfer of the trials of Bidognetti and fellow fugitive Casalesi boss, Antonio Iovine to Rome for "legitimate suspiscions".

=== Backlash against collaborating relatives ===
On May 2, 2008, Bidognetti's uncle, Umberto was murdered at Castel Volturno, due to his son Domenico's collaboration with the police. He had refused police protection after his son's repentance. In the following month, a group of hitmen disguised as police officers wounded Anna Carrino, the niece of Anna Carrino, in Villaricca. She was shot in the stomach when she opened the door. Carrino's testimony led to the arrest of several of his henchmen. However, police believe that the real target of the attack may have been the woman's mother, Anna Carrino's sister. These incidents are believed to be part of the murder strategy of Iovine and Zagaria, in order to dissuade those who wish to collaborate with law enforcement.

Bidognetti's son, Gianluca, was arrested on November 21, 2008, and charged with the attempted murder of Anna Carrino's niece.
