= Francesco Schiavone =

Italian Camorra boss (born 1954)

- Schiavone at his arrest in July 1998
- Born: 3 March 1954 (age 72); Casal di Principe, Campania, Italy
- Other name: Sandokan
- Spouse: Giuseppina Nappa
- Children: Including Nicola, Walter, Emanuele Libero and Carmine
- Status: Imprisoned under the 41-bis regime
- Allegiance: Casalesi clan (Camorra)
- Convictions: Mafia-type association, murder
- Trial: Spartacus Trial (1998 – 2010)
- Penalty: Life imprisonment

Details
- Date apprehended: 11 July 1998, Casal di Principe
- Imprisoned at: L'Aquila prison

Francesco Schiavone (Italian pronunciation: [franˈtʃesko skjaˈvoːne]; born 3 March 1954) is an Italian Camorra boss, formerly the head of the Casalesi clan of Casal di Principe in the province of Caserta. Because of his thick, dark beard, he has been dubbed "Sandokan", after the main character of a popular 1970s television series starring Kabir Bedi.

Arrested in 1998 after five years as a fugitive, Schiavone was sentenced to life imprisonment in the Spartacus Trial for mafia-type association and several murders; the sentence became final in 2010. In 2022 he received a further life sentence, also final, as the instigator of the 1989 murder of a municipal police officer. He has been held under the 41-bis prison regime for most of his detention. In March 2024 he began collaborating with prosecutors, but after three months the Naples prosecutor's office ended the collaboration, having found nothing new or useful in his statements, and he was returned to the 41-bis regime.

== Early career ==
He started his criminal career as a driver and bodyguard of Umberto Ammaturo. His first arrest was in 1972 for illegal possession of firearms. Schiavone took part in several Camorra clan wars in which dozens of people were killed in the Naples area. He sided with Antonio Bardellino, the founder of the Casalesi clan and prominent leader of the Nuova Famiglia, and Mario Iovine against the Nuova Camorra Organizzata (NCO) of Raffaele Cutolo. When the NCO was defeated, an internal feud broke out between Bardellino and Iovine. Schiavone, together with Francesco Bidognetti and Vincenzo De Falco sided with Iovine.

In May 1989 Schiavone, then 34, was arrested by French police in a villa at Millery, about thirty kilometres from Lyon, together with Giuseppe Caterino and two other men. He was carrying false documents. Italian investigators regarded him as the heir of Bardellino, who had disappeared in Brazil in 1988. He was released from prison in Marseille in May 1990, when the time limit for pre-trial detention expired. On 13 December 1990 he was arrested again with Francesco Bidognetti, after a brief exchange of fire with the carabinieri, at a meeting of fugitives in the villa of Gaetano Corvino, a Christian Democrat councillor of Casal di Principe.

A new feud broke out between the De Falco group and Iovine and Schiavone. De Falco allegedly tipped off the police about the December 1990 meeting, and Schiavone and Bidognetti ordered his killing on 2 February 1991 in Casal di Principe. In retaliation, Mario Iovine was shot dead in a telephone box in Cascais, Portugal, on 6 March 1991. In 2009 the Court of Assizes of Naples sentenced Vincenzo De Falco's brother Nunzio and Francesco Piacenti to life imprisonment as the instigators of Iovine's murder. While Schiavone was in custody, the De Falco group was defeated. With the older bosses Bardellino and Iovine dead and rivals such as De Falco eliminated, he became the head of the clan in the 1990s. According to the political scientist Felia Allum, he was the strongest and most astute leader of his generation.

== Fugitive and arrest ==
In 1993, after completing a three-year prison sentence, Schiavone disappeared before judges could put him under surveillance. The Schiavone and Bidognetti factions now led the Casalesi clan. After more than five years on the run, he was arrested on 11 July 1998, in his hideout – a secret apartment behind a sliding wall of granite in a villa in Casal di Principe, equipped with high-tech tools. Officers of the Direzione Investigativa Antimafia searched the house for thirteen hours before he surrendered. His wife, Giuseppina Nappa, and two young daughters born while he was on the run were with him. At the time he was regarded as the most wanted fugitive of the Camorra.

Schiavone had already been arrested on at least two prior occasions, but each time he was able to avoid a lengthy sentence on legal technicalities. The mayor of Naples, Antonio Bassolino, praised the local police, and said, "the head of one of the most dangerous criminal clans in southern Italy has been arrested". He compared the arrest to that of the Sicilian Mafia boss Salvatore Riina in 1993.

Police informers described him as a charismatic figure with a business-oriented approach, who avoided violence that would draw police attention to the clan's affairs. In his hideout, police found a collection of books on Napoleon. While on the run, he fathered three of his six children.

== Business interests ==
According to the writer Roberto Saviano, the Casalesi clan drew large profits from public contracts for the construction of the A1 highway Rome-Naples and the prison in Santa Maria Capua Vetere. They also were active in waste management from the north of Italy in Caserta, and the distribution racket of dairy products by Parmalat and Cirio. Profits were invested in real estate in Parma and Milan.

Saviano, who grew up in Casal di Principe, has written of the family's wealth: "In two legal proceedings against the Schiavone family in August 1996, authorities confiscated 450 billion lire; a year later, they seized another 515 billion. That adds up to US$788 million… from just one of the many families that make up the Casalesi, an amount that would bring any business to its knees. But the Schiavone family and the Casalesi continue to prosper. All told, they are estimated to be worth about US$47 billion." According to press reports, the family's assets were managed by his wife, Giuseppina Nappa, and his brother Walter.

== Trials and convictions ==
On 15 September 2005, at the end of the first-instance Spartacus Trial, which had opened seven and a half years earlier, the Court of Assizes of Santa Maria Capua Vetere imposed 21 life sentences on members of the Casalesi clan. Five of them were imposed on Schiavone, for five murders. Over the course of the first trial and the last appeal, five people involved in the case were murdered, including an interpreter. A judge and two journalists received death threats.

On 19 June 2008 the Court of Assizes of Appeal of Naples confirmed 16 life sentences, including Schiavone's, and on 15 January 2010 the Court of Cassation made them final. Schiavone's lieutenant Francesco Bidognetti, known as "Cicciotto 'e Mezzanotte", was also given life imprisonment. Michele Zagaria, another Casalesi boss, got the same sentence but was on the run and was included in the list of most wanted fugitives in Italy, until his arrest on 7 December 2011.

On 15 March 2022 the Court of Cassation confirmed a further life sentence for Schiavone as the instigator of the murder of Antonio Diana, a municipal police officer killed in San Cipriano d'Aversa in 1989. According to the court, Schiavone believed that Diana had acted as a lookout in the killing of Michele Russo, one of his associates.

== Collaboration with prosecutors ==
In March 2024 Schiavone began collaborating with prosecutors. Investigators hoped that he would shed light on unsolved cases such as the killing of Antonio Bardellino in Brazil in 1988, and on links between the Camorra and politics. In July 2024 the anti-Camorra prosecutors of Naples, led by Nicola Gratteri, concluded that his statements contained nothing new or of investigative interest and revoked his protection programme. The Ministry of Justice then ordered his return to the 41-bis regime.

== Family ==
Schiavone's cousin Carmine Schiavone became a collaborator of justice in 1993, and his statements helped to start the investigations that led to the Spartacus trial. His eldest son, Nicola, whom investigators regarded as the acting head of his father's group, was arrested on 15 June 2010 in a fortified villa on the outskirts of Casal di Principe. He had been sought since at least December 2009. Two of Schiavone's sons later became collaborators of justice, Nicola in 2018 and Walter in 2021.
