= Domenico Bidognetti =

Italian criminal

Domenico Bidognetti is a former member of the Casalesi clan from Casal di Principe in the province of Caserta between Naples and Salerno. He is a cousin of Casalesi boss, Francesco Bidognetti. He became a pentito and collaborated with Italian Justice in early 2008. His nickname is "Bruttaccione".
