= Santa Maria Capua Vetere Prison =

Prison in Santa Maria Capua Vetere, Italy

Coordinates: 41.0434°N 14.2354°E

- Interactive map of Santa Maria Capua Vetere Prison
- Location: Strada statale 7 bis, Santa Maria Capua Vetere, Italy
- Status: Operational
- Security class: Casa circondariale
- Capacity: 826
- Population: 1,030 (24 October 2026)
- Opened: 1996
- Managed by: Ministry of Justice
- Governor: Donatella Filomena Rotundo

Santa Maria Capua Vetere Prison (Italian: Carcere di Santa Maria Capua Vetere), officially the Casa circondariale "Francesco Uccella", is a prison in Santa Maria Capua Vetere, in the Province of Caserta in Campania, Italy. It has been in use since 1996 as a casa circondariale, a prison that holds people awaiting trial.

On 6 April 2020, during the COVID-19 pandemic, prison police officers beat inmates of the prison's Nilo ward after a protest. A judge later called it "a horrible massacre". In November 2022, 105 people went on trial before the Corte d'Assise of Santa Maria Capua Vetere. Torture was among the charges against nearly half of the prison officers.

== History ==
The prison has been active as a casa circondariale since 1996, and in October 2013 a new detention pavilion for 370 inmates was opened. On 1 July 2013 it was named after Francesco Uccella, a brigadier general who had led the prison complex from 1991 to 2001. Its wards are named after rivers, such as the Danubio, the Tevere and the Nilo.

== Water supply ==
For 26 years the prison had no connection to the public water network, and water was supplied by tanks and bottled water. In 2020 the regional ombudsman for prisoners said that two tanker trucks brought water for the kitchen every day and that inmates received two bottles of water a day. The regional government of Campania had allocated €2.19 million for the works in 2016. Running water reached the prison in December 2022.

== Violence of April 2020 ==
On 5 April 2020 inmates of the Nilo ward protested over the lack of masks and tests, after a positive case of COVID-19 was announced among the prisoners. The next day the ward was searched by officers of the prison and about a hundred officers from other prisons in Campania. Surveillance footage showed officers with batons beating, kicking and punching inmates, none of whom was seen resisting. The preliminary investigations judge said that inmates were made to strip and kneel and were then beaten. Some had their hair cut and their beards shaved. A 28-year-old Algerian inmate was found dead on 4 May 2020.

== Investigation and trial ==
On 28 June 2021 the preliminary investigations judge ordered 52 precautionary measures against prison police officers and officials. More than 110 people were under investigation, for crimes that included aggravated torture, forgery of public records and obstruction of the investigation. The newspaper Domani then published the surveillance footage. The justice minister, Marta Cartabia, called the events "an offense and an outrage to the dignity of prisoners". On 14 July 2021 she visited the prison with the prime minister, Mario Draghi, who said that collective responsibility lay with a system that needed reform.

On 12 July 2022 the preliminary hearing judge sent 105 people to trial, including prison police officers and officials of the prison administration. The trial opened on 7 November 2022 in the prison's bunker courtroom. It is heard by the Corte d'Assise because of charges connected with the death of the Algerian inmate. On 22 July 2026 the prosecutors asked for sentences totalling 766 years for 102 defendants. According to the prosecution, nearly 300 inmates of the Nilo ward were tortured. In October and November 2026 the defence lawyers were giving their closing arguments, and the trial was still in progress.

== Population and conditions ==
On 24 October 2026 the prison held 1,030 inmates, against an official capacity of 826 places, 179 of which were not available. In March 2024 it held 940 inmates. The women's section held 64 inmates, all in the high-security category, and one of the eight sections of the Nilo ward was for inmates with psychiatric illness. The prison runs tailoring workshops in the men's and women's sections.
