= Castel Volturno massacre =

Massacre of African migrants by an Italian crime gang

- Location: 40.9202°N 14.0246°E; Baia Verde, a suburb of the Castel Volturno municipality in the province of Caserta
- Date: 18 September 2008; 21:00 - 21:30 approximately
- Target: Owner of an arcade, six civilians
- Attack type: Massacre, mass shooting
- Deaths: 7
- Injuries: 1
- Perpetrators: Gangsters from the Casalesi clan. It was performed by Alfonso Cesarano, Alessandro Cirillo and Oreste Spagnuolo, with the suspected involvement of Francesco Cirillo, Emilio Di Caterino and Giovanni Letizia, on the orders of Giuseppe Setola.
- Motive: Control of the drug market and real estate

The Castel Volturno massacre (Italian: Strage di Castel Volturno or Strage di San Gennaro) is the name given by the Italian press to a mass shooting perpetrated by the Casalesi clan in which seven people were killed on 18 September 2008. The massacre outside the Ob Ob Exotic Fashion tailor shop on the Via Domitiana was widely characterized as part of a growing conflict between the native Camorra and the immigrant African gangs. Murdered were Antonio Celiento, the owner of an arcade in Baia Verde, and six innocent African immigrants: Samuel Kwaku, 26 (Togo); Alaj Ababa (Togo); Francis Antwi, 31 (Ghana); Eric Affum Yeboah, 25 (Ghana); Alex Geemes, 28 (Liberia) and Cristopher Adams, 28 (Liberia). Joseph Ayimbora (Ghana), 34, survived by feigning death; he later helped identify the killers.

The murders sparked violent protests from Castel Volturno's immigrant community the following day, which culminated in the signing of measures launched by the Ministry of Interior and the Ministry of Defense on combating organized crime and illegal immigration to Caserta.

The Africans' killers were identified as Alfonso Cesarano, Alessandro Cirillo and Oreste Spagnuolo. A further three people, Francesco Cirillo, Emilio Di Caterino and Giovanni Letizia, have been suspected of involvement in the murders, which were ordered by Giuseppe Setola, affiliated with the Casalesi clan.

== Arrests ==
On 22 September 2008, the first arrest was made in connection with the massacre. Alfonso Cesarano, a Casalesi triggerman, was found in his parents' home in Baia Verde, where he was under house arrest on drug charges next to the arcade where the first victim, Celiento, had been killed.

The Italian government deployed 400 troops into the area. A huge anti-Camorra operation conducted in that same month by the Carabinieri dealt a devastating blow on the Casalesi clan, resulting in the arrests of 107 people including prominent members of the association, some of whom were on the list of 30 most wanted fugitives in Italy. Among those arrested were Alessandro Cirillo and Oreste Spagnuolo, the main co-ordinators of the attack. On January 14, 2009, Setola was finally arrested in Mignano Monte Lungo after a week on the run. During this period, he was included in the list of 30 most dangerous fugitives in Italy and was sentenced to life imprisonment in absentia after being convicted on charges of ordering several killings and massacres, including that at Castel Volturno.

== Convictions ==
In 2011, the court in Santa Maria Capua Vetere (Caserta) sentenced Giuseppe Setola, Davide Granato, Alessandro Cirillo, Giovanni Letizia to life imprisonment and Antonio Alluce to 23 years. The Court recognized the existence of aggravating circumstances such as racial hatred and terrorist purposes.
