= Roberto Saviano =

Italian journalist and writer (born 1979)

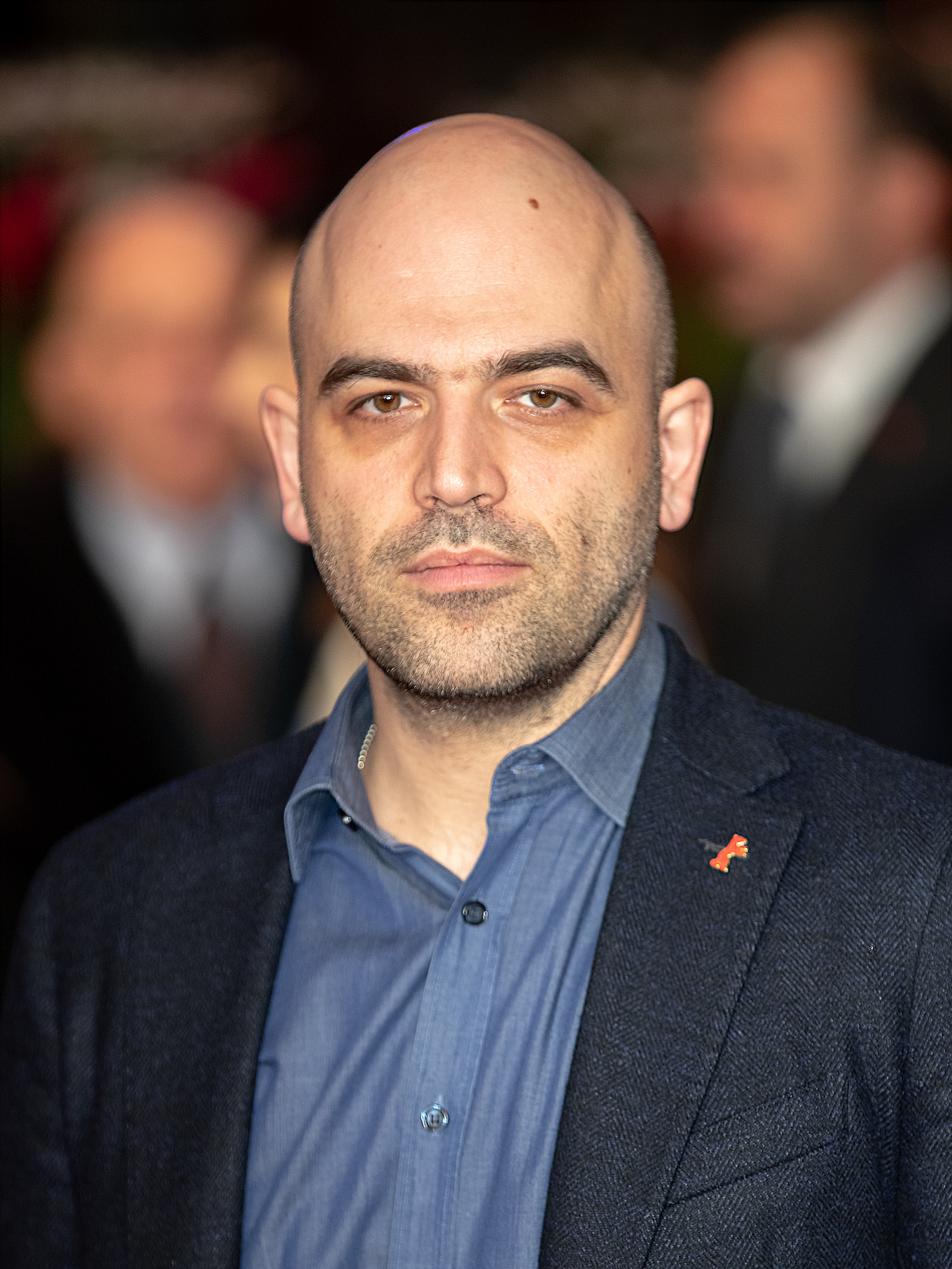
- Saviano in 2019
- Born: 22 September 1979 (age 47); Naples, Italy
- Occupations: Writer; journalist; screenwriter
- Writing career
- Period: 2000–present
- Notable works: Gomorrah; ZeroZeroZero; Piranhas
- Website: robertosaviano.com

Roberto Saviano (Italian: [roˈbɛrto saˈvjaːno]; born 22 September 1979) is an Italian writer, journalist, and screenwriter. In his writings, including articles and his book Gomorrah, he uses literature and investigative reporting to tell of the economic reality of the territory and business of organized crime in Italy, in particular the Camorra crime syndicate, and of organized crime more generally. His writing has drawn praise from other writers and cultural figures, such as Umberto Eco.

After receiving death threats in 2006 made by the Casalesi clan of the Camorra, a clan which he had denounced in his exposé and in the piazza of Casal di Principe during a demonstration in defence of legality, Saviano was put under a strict security protocol. Since 13 October 2006, he has lived under police protection.

Saviano has collaborated with numerous important Italian and international newspapers. Currently, he writes for the Italian publications l'Espresso, la Repubblica, and The Post Internazionale. Internationally, he collaborates in the United States with The Washington Post, The New York Times, and Time; in Spain with El País; in Germany with Die Zeit and Der Spiegel; in Sweden with Expressen; and in the United Kingdom with The Times and The Guardian.

== Biography ==
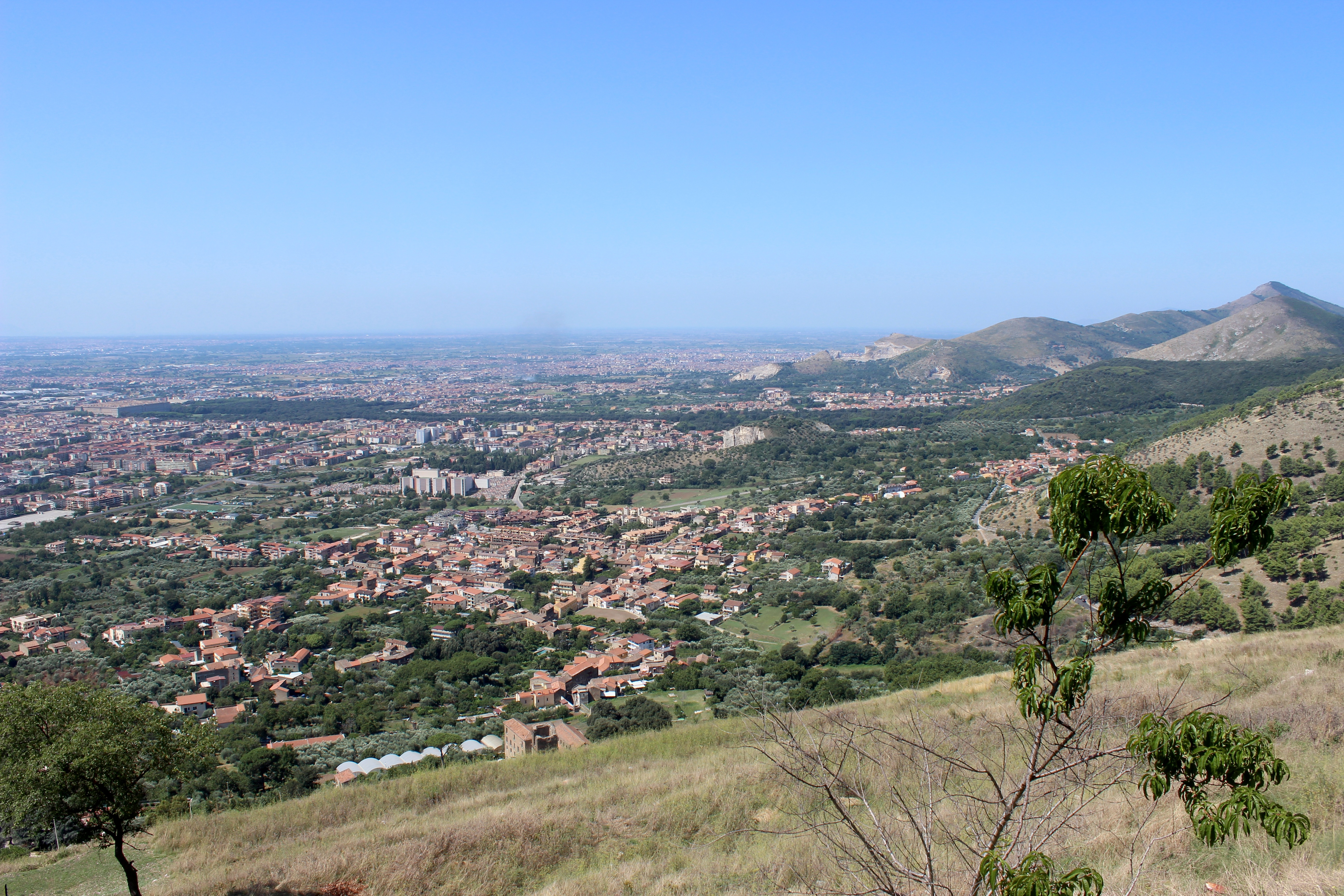
Saviano grew up near Caserta.

Son of Luigi Saviano, a Neapolitan doctor, and Miriam Haftar, a Ligurian of Jewish origins, Roberto Saviano received his high school diploma from the Armando Diaz State Scientific High School and then graduated in philosophy from the University of Naples Federico II, where he was the student of historian Francesco Barbagallo. In 1997, while in high school, he grew close to the Italian Marxist–Leninist Party (PMLI) and published articles on its weekly newspaper, Il Bolscevico, under the pseudonym Roberto Ercolino. However, in 2001, he broke all links with the PMLI.

He began his career in journalism in 2002, writing for numerous magazines and daily papers, including Pulp, Diario, Sud, Il manifesto, the website Nazione Indiana, and for the Camorra monitoring unit of the Corriere del Mezzogiorno. His articles at the time were already important enough to spur judicial authorities at the beginning of 2005 to listen to him regarding organized crime.

In March 2006, he published Gomorrah, about the Camorra. He is the author, along with Mario Gelardi, of a theatrical work of the same name and is a screenwriter for Gomorrah, the movie based on the book. On 10 December 2009, in the presence of Nobel Prize winner Dario Fo, Saviano received the title of Honorary Member of the Academy of Fine Arts of Brera and the Second Level Academic Diploma Honoris Causa in Communication and Art Education, which is the highest degree given by the university. On 22 January 2011, the University of Genoa awarded him a bachelor's degree honoris causa in law "for the important contribution to the fight against crime and to the defence of legality in our country". Saviano dedicated the honour to the judges of Milan's district attorney's office who were investigating Rubygate. This led to a controversy with Marina Berlusconi, daughter of Silvio Berlusconi and president of the publishing house Arnoldo Mondadori Editore.

Saviano is primarily influenced by southern Italian intellectuals such as Giustino Fortunato and Gaetano Salvemini, by the anarchists Errico Malatesta and Mikhail Bakunin, and by poet Rocco Scotellaro. Additionally, he has said that his educational background includes many prominent writers such as Ernst Jünger, Ezra Pound, Louis Ferdinand Celine, Carl Schmitt, and Julius Evola.

In 2015, Saviano collaborated with the Neapolitan playwright Mimmo Borrelli on the play Sanghenapule – Vita straordinaria di San Gennaro, which was part of the 2015/2016 season of the Piccolo Teatro of Milan.

In 2006, following the success of Gomorrah, which denounces the activities of the Camorra, Saviano received ominous threats. These were confirmed by police informants and reports that revealed attempts on Saviano's life by the Casalesi clan. Investigators have claimed that the Camorra selected Casalesi clan boss Giuseppe Setola to kill Saviano.

After the Neapolitan police investigations, the Italian Minister for Interior Affairs Giuliano Amato assigned Saviano a personal bodyguard and transferred him from Naples. In the fall of 2008, informant Carmine Schiavone, cousin of the imprisoned Casalesi clan boss Francesco Schiavone, revealed to the authorities that the clan had planned to eliminate Saviano and his police escort by Christmas on the motorway between Rome and Naples with a bomb; in the same period, Saviano announced his intention to leave Italy in order to stop having to live as a convict and reclaim his life.

On 20 October 2008, six Nobel Prize-awarded authors and intellectuals (Orhan Pamuk, Dario Fo, Rita Levi-Montalcini, Desmond Tutu, Günter Grass, and Mikhail Gorbachev) published an article saying that they sided with Saviano against the Camorra. They also stated that the Italian government must protect Saviano's life and help him lead a normal life. Signatures were collected on the website of the Italian newspaper La Repubblica.

Saviano contributed an op-ed piece to the 24 January 2010 issue of the New York Times, entitled "Italy's African Heroes"^{.} He wrote about the January 2010 riots between African immigrants and Italians in Rosarno, a town in Calabria. Saviano suggests that the rioting was more of a response to the migrants' exploitation by the 'Ndrangheta, or Calabrian mafia, than to the hostility of Italians.

In November 2010, he hosted, along with Fabio Fazio, the Italian television program Vieni via con me, which was broadcast over four weeks by Rai 3.

Saviano's book, ZeroZeroZero was published by Feltrinelli in 2013, and the English translation was published by Penguin Random House in July 2015. This book is a study of the financial dealings around cocaine, covering its movement across continents and the role of drug money in international finance.

In October 2023, Saviano was given a suspended €1,000 fine for his use of profanity against Giorgia Meloni in December 2020. Saviano used the word during a televised interview while describing Meloni's and Matteo Salvini's anti-immigration stance. Per the ruling, Saviano will only have to pay the fine if he repeats the offence. According to Saviano's lawyer, he will appeal the verdict.

== Gomorrah, ZeroZeroZero ==
It's my reader who bothers criminal organizations, it's not me. My reader is what they don't want. The fact that, in this moment, we are talking about it, that all the newspapers talked about it, that books continue to be published, and that documentaries continue to come out is what they don't want; they don't want attention on themselves, on their names, and, above all, on their businesses.

— Roberto Saviano on his book Gomorrah

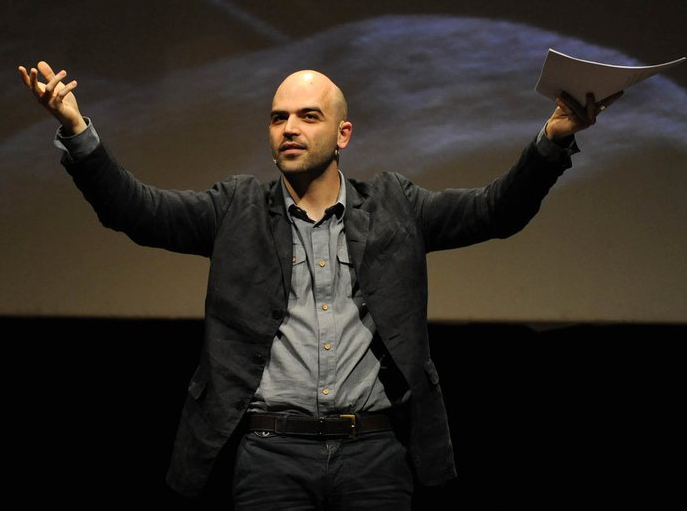
Roberto Saviano in 2011

In March 2006, Saviano's first book, Gomorrah: A Personal Journey into the Violent International Empire of Naples' Organized Crime System, was published as part of Mondadori's Strade Blu series. It describes the business and criminal world of the Camorra and of the places where the organization was born and exists: the region of Campania, the city of Naples, the towns of Casal di Principe, San Cipriano d'Aversa, and the territory around Aversa known as the agro aversano. Having grown up there, the author introduces the reader to a reality unknown to outsiders. The book talks about the criminal bosses' sumptuous villas copied from Hollywood films, rural lands filled with the toxic waste of half of Europe, and a population that not only cohabitates with organised crime but even protects it and approves of its actions.

As of August 2009, the book had sold 2.5 million copies in Italy alone and was translated into 52 languages. In the rest of the world, about 2 million copies of Gomorrah were sold. It was present on bestseller lists in Germany, the Netherlands, Belgium, France, Sweden, Finland, Lithuania, Albania, Israel, Lebanon, and Austria.

A stage show was based on Gomorrah, earning Saviano the best actor of a new Italian play award at the Olimpici del Teatro/Theater Olympics in 2008. A film of the same name, directed by Matteo Garrone, was also created; it won the prestigious Grand Prix at the Cannes Film Festival in 2008. In 2009, the film won the Tonino Guerra Prize for best script at the Bari International Film Festival.

A television show titled Gomorrah - La serie was produced by Sky Italia, Fandango, Cattleya, Beta Film, and LA7, under the supervision of Saviano and the direction of Stefano Sollima, Francesca Comencini, and Claudio Cupellini. It ran for five series, commencing in 2014 and concluding in 2021.

In 2016, the same production crew began filming ZeroZeroZero, an adaptation of Saviano's 2013 book of the same name about the international cocaine trade.

== Threats and life under police protection ==
The success of his book created numerous problems for Saviano, starting with threatening letters, silent phone calls, and protective isolation.

During a demonstration for legality in Casal di Principe on 23 September 2006, the writer denounced the business of the leaders of the Casalese clan, Francesco Bidognetti and Francesco Schiavone (currently in prison), and the two ruling bosses at the time, Antonio Iovine and Michele Zagaria. He addressed them in robust tones ("You are not from this land! Quit being part of this land!") and invited residents to rebel. Because of the threats and intimidation Saviano received consequently, the then-Minister of the Interior, Giuliano Amato, decided to assign him police protection beginning on 13 October 2006.

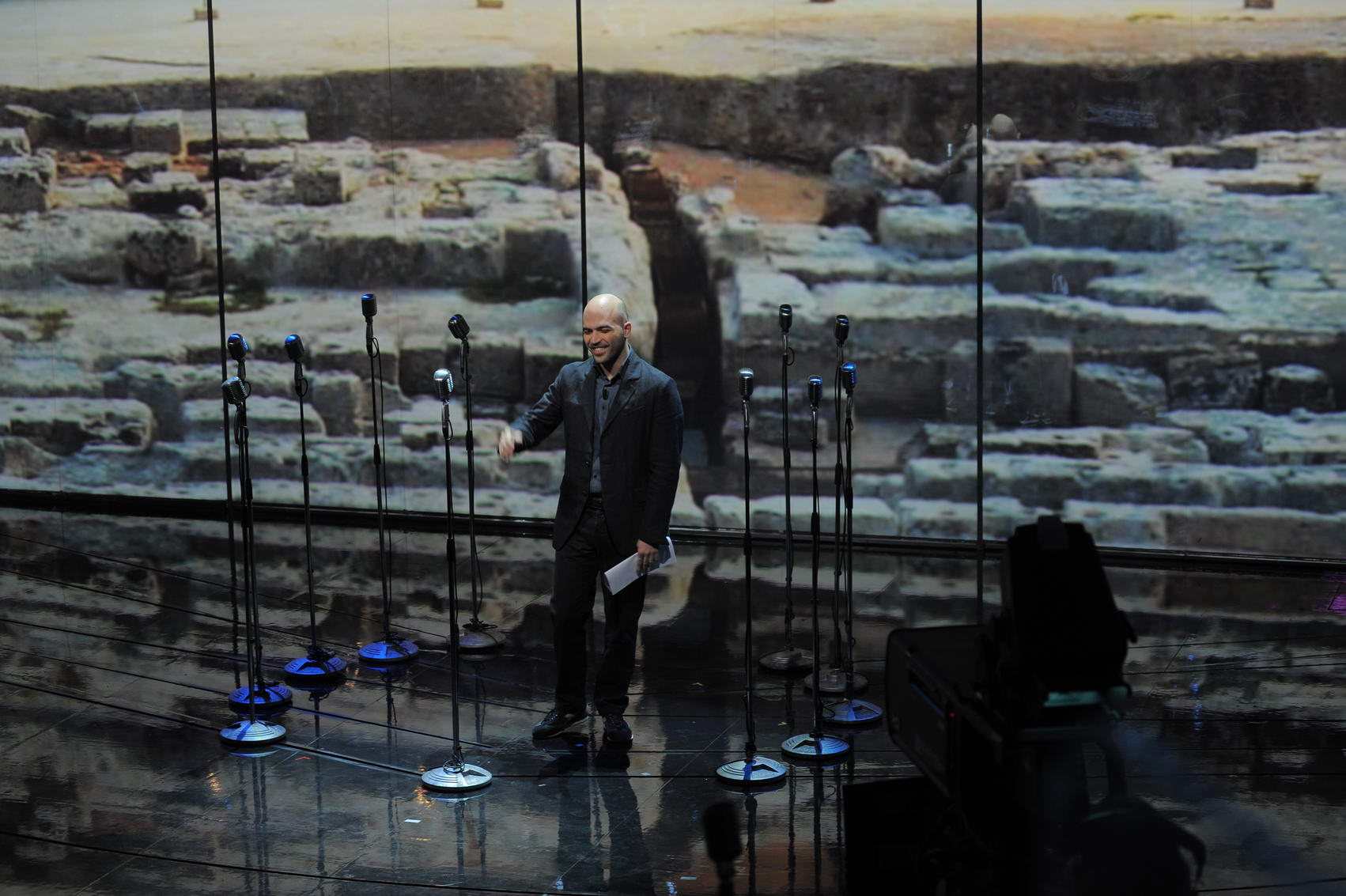
Roberto Saviano during a Rai 3 television program

On 14 March 2008, during the Spartacus Trial, the attorney for Casalese bosses Francesco Bidognetti and Antonio Iovine, Michele Santonastaso (assisted by Carmine D'Aniello), read a letter written jointly by Bidognetti and Iovine (while both were in prison) to the president of the First Section of the Appellate Court of Assizes, Raimondo Romeres. The letter contained a request to move the trial due to legittima suspicione, or doubt surrounding the impartiality of the judicial body, caused by the alleged influence of Roberto Saviano, Rosaria Capacchione, and the district attorneys Federico Cafiero de Raho and Raffaele Cantone, on the judges. Following this, Minister of the Interior Amato decided to strengthen security measures for the writer, increasing his police escort from three to five men. Bidognetti and Iovine, and their attorneys Michele Santonastaso and Carmine D'Aniello, were then charged with intimidation of Saviano and Capacchione. Before the third criminal section of the Court of Naples, the Assistant Prosecutor of the District Anti-Mafia Directorate (DDA), Antonello Ardituro, requested the maximum sentence on conviction of one year and six months imprisonment. The sentence was passed for Bidognetti, Santonastaso, and D'Aniello, while Iovine was acquitted due to insufficient proof. The attorney general for Reggio Calabria, Federico Cafiero de Raho, testified during the trial, stating that Saviano was a "mortal enemy of the clan" and recalling that Saviano was among the few journalists present at all 52 of the prosecutor's closing speeches for the Spartacus Trial.

On 14 October 2008, reports emerged of a possible assassination plot against Saviano. A police inspector of the Milan Anti-Mafia Investigation Department DIA) informed the DDA that the pentito, Carmine Schiavone (cousin of boss Francesco Schiavone, aka Sandokan), had informed him of a plan, already in operation, to kill the writer and his bodyguards before Christmas through a spectacular attack on the highway between Rome and Naples, in the style of the assassination of anti-Mafia judge Giovanni Falcone at Capaci. However, when interrogated by magistrates, Schiavone denied any knowledge of the plan, provoking the writer's immediate response: "It's obvious that he'd say this; if he were to talk [about the plan], it would mean implicitly admitting to still having connections with organized crime". Subsequently, the district attorney heading the investigation requested and obtained dismissal of the case as the reports appeared to be unfounded, although Schiavone confirmed that Saviano had been condemned to death by the Casalese clan.

In October 2008, Saviano decided to leave Italy for a time, as the result of threats, which were confirmed by reports and statements from informants, revealing a Casalesi clan plan to eliminate him.

I believe I have the right to a break. Over the years, I have thought that giving in to the temptation to retreat was neither a very good idea nor, above all, an intelligent one. I believed that it was rather stupid—in addition to being improper—to give up, to bend to men who are nothing, people whom you abhor for what they think, for how they act, for how they live, and for their very being. But, in this moment, I don't see any reason why I should insist on living in this way, as a prisoner of myself, of my book, of my success. Fuck success. I want a life. That's it. I want a house. I want to fall in love, to drink a beer in public, to go to a bookstore and to choose a book by reading the cover. I want to go for a stroll, to sunbathe, to walk under the rain, to meet people without fear and without frightening my mother. I want to be surrounded by my friends, to be able to laugh, and to not have to talk about myself, always about myself as though I were terminally ill and they were struggling with a boring, yet inevitable, visit. Damn it, I'm only twenty-eight years old! And I still want to write, write, write because it's my passion and my resistance. And in order to write, I need to plunge my hands into reality, to cover myself in it, to smell its odor and its sweat, and to not live quarantined in a hyperbolic chamber inside military barracks—today here, tomorrow two hundred kilometers away, moved like a package without knowing what happened and what can happen. A perennial state of bewilderment and insecurity keeps me from thinking, reflecting, concentrating on what I have to do. Sometimes I surprise myself thinking these words: I want my life back. I silently repeat them, one by one, to myself.

— Roberto Saviano

== Appeal from Nobel Prize winners ==
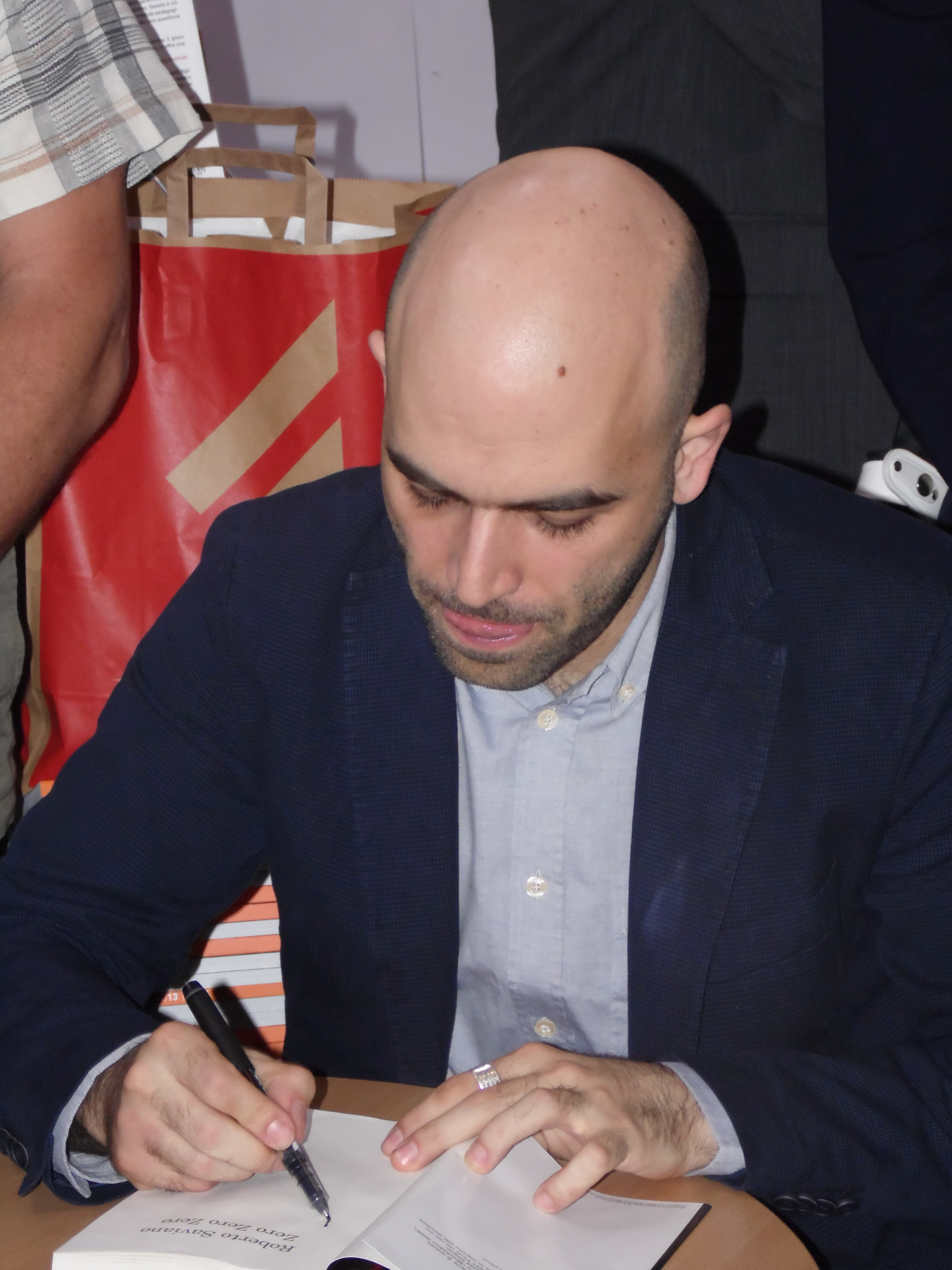
Roberto Saviano signing his books in Turin, 2013

People unfamiliar with Camorra power dynamics often think that killing an innocent person is a naive gesture on the part of the clans because it only legitimizes and amplifies the victim's example and words, a confirmation of the truths he spoke. Wrong. That's never the way it is. As soon as you die in the land of the Camorra, you're enshrouded in countless suspicions, and innocence is a distant hypothesis, the last one imaginable. You are guilty until proven innocent. In the land of the Camorra, the theory of modern rights is turned on its head.

— (Roberto Saviano, Gomorrah, translated by Virginia Jewiss)

On 20 October 2008, six international Nobel Prize winners rallied in support of Roberto Saviano, asking the Italian government to do something to protect him and to defeat the Camorra, and emphasizing the fact that organized crime is not merely a problem for police that only concerns the writer, but is a problem for democracy that concerns all free citizens. The appeal concluded that citizens cannot tolerate the fact that the events described in Saviano's book are taking place in 2008 in Europe, just as they can't tolerate that the price one pays for denouncing these events means losing one's freedom and safety. The Nobel Prize winners who launched the appeal were: Dario Fo, Mikhail Gorbachev, Günter Grass, Rita Levi-Montalcini, Orhan Pamuk, and Desmond Tutu.

The appeal was signed by writers including Jonathan Franzen, Javier Marías, Jonathan Safran Foer, Jonathan Lethem, Martin Amis, Chuck Palahniuk, Nathan Englander, Ian McEwan, Hans Magnus Enzensberger, José Saramago, Elfriede Jelinek, Wislawa Szymborska, Betty Williams, Lech Wałęsa, Paul Auster, Siri Hustvedt, Peter Schneider, Colum McCann, Patrick McGrath, Cathleen Shine, Junot Díaz, Tahar Ben Jelloun, Taslima Nasreen, Caro Llewelyn, Ingrid Betancourt, Adam Michnik, and Claudio Magris. Foreign media—from El País to Le Nouvel Observateur and from Courrier International to Al Arabiya and CNN—also spread the initiative.

Following this, various radio stations opened up to debates and comments on the subject. The program Fahrenheit on Italy's Rai Radio 3 organized a marathon reading of Gomorrah, in which celebrities from the world of culture, news, theatre, and civil society participated. Numerous Italian cities also offered honorary citizenship to the writer, while many schools subscribed to the appeal. The Casa della Memoria e della Storia ("House of Memory and History") in Rome hosted an eight-hour choral reading of Gomorrah.

In addition to the signatures of the six prominent figures, normal citizens were able to sign the appeal on a special page created by the newspaper La Repubblica. More than 250,000 signatures were collected.

== Detailed analysis ==
Need for bodyguards

In October 2009, the head of the Rapid Response Team of Naples, Vittorio Pisani, questioned the need for a security detail to protect Roberto Saviano, maintaining that the death threats had not been confirmed. In 2008, the director Pasquale Squitieri also cast doubt on the appropriateness of the security detail. According to him, Saviano went to the Cannes Film Festival "probably to put on a bit of a show" and "those who are really targets have bodyguards, of course, but they are also prohibited from flying on [commercial] planes and frequenting public places because they could put themselves and others in danger." Squitieri's declarations triggered a controversy between the two of them, and the producer of the film Gomorrah, Domenico Procacci, intervened, calling Squitieri's declarations "despicable."

The head of police, Antonio Manganelli, replied by reaffirming the need for bodyguards. Furthermore, the head DA for the Anti-Mafia Office of Naples, Federico Cafiero de Raho, declared that Saviano is exposed to a high risk and, therefore, requires protection. The district attorneys Raffaele Cantone and Franco Roberti, both magistrates with years of experience on the front lines fighting against the clans, reiterated Saviano's dangerous situation. Journalist Giuseppe D'Avanzo wrote a piece for La Repubblica, requesting the resignation of the head of the Rapid Response Team for his declarations.

Saviano replied in an article for La Repubblica, denouncing the attempt to isolate him and to cause the "disintegration" of the public's solidarity with him, comparing his case with those of Peppino Impastato, Giuseppe Fava, and Giancarlo Siani. Following Pisani's initiatives, Saviano had to "exhibit, as requested, the real cause of the threats."

On 19 May 2014, Pisani, testifying during the trial of the Casalesi bosses and their lawyers, who had used an istanza di remissione (request for remission) to threaten Saviano and others in the courtroom, renounced the headline of the interview that he had given to the Corriere della Sera in 2009: Saviano should not have bodyguards. "I don't agree with the headline of that article," Pisani declared to the judges. He also clarified the content of the investigation his team had conducted on the threats to Saviano: "We investigated and showed some photos to Saviano, who, however, did not identify them as the people who had threatened him. The decision to assign a security detail was obviously not up to us." Pisani, therefore, explained that he did not say the words pronounced in the article since the Carabinieri (Italy's national military police) were the ones who had to make the decision concerning Saviano's security detail.

Cesare Battisti

In 2004, the internet site Carmilla Online collected signatures in support of the ex-terrorist member of PAC (Armed Proletarians for Communism), Cesare Battisti, who had become a writer and was then hiding in France and Brazil. More than 1,500 signatures were obtained from the political-cultural areas of France and Italy, including Saviano's. However, in January 2009, Saviano retracted his signature, saying that this was out of respect for the victims. This petition attracted media attention thanks to the interest of the weekly magazine Panorama.

Declarations on Israel

During the demonstration "For Truth, for Israel", organized by representative Fiamma Nirenstein of the PdL and held in Rome on 7 October 2010, Saviano participated through a video message, praising the Jewish state as a place of freedom and civilization. In his speech, the writer spoke of his Jewish roots and declared that Israel is a "democracy under siege," Tel Aviv is "a hospitable city" "that never sleeps, is full of life and, above all, tolerance, a city that succeeds more than any other in welcoming the gay community" and that "the refugees of Darfur, for example, are welcomed in Israel."

These, along with other declarations, caused controversy and were criticized for having ignored the injustices suffered by the Palestinian population. Activist Vittorio Arrigoni responded to Saviano's affirmations through a video, inviting him to revise his opinions and to define Shimon Peres—commended by Saviano—as a "war criminal."

Saviano responded to the objections by saying "In the video ... I never supported the war, never supported Operation Cast Lead, or the Israeli Right, never Netanyahu. I spoke about another Israel, an Israel to which one may turn in order to obtain peace." Referring to the writer Arrigoni, he replied, "In response to the question of are you with the Palestinians or the Israelis, I may disappoint, but I will always respond how my friend David Grossman taught me: 'I am with peace.'"

Article on Benedetto Croce

Saviano was accused by Marta Herling, the granddaughter of the Abruzzese philosopher Benedetto Croce, of having written a dishonest article about him. The writer affirmed that during the 1883 earthquake of Casamicciola, in which Croce lost his parents and sister, he allegedly followed his dying father's advice and offered 100,000 lire (a very large sum for the time), to whoever helped him out from under the rubble. The testimony taken up by Saviano during the show Vieni via con me ("Come away with me") in 2010, was denied by Herling in a letter published in the Corriere del Mezzogiorno and in two interviews given to TG1, during which she explicitly maintained that the writer invented the episode.

Such a theory, according to the director of the Corriere del Mezzogiorno, Marco Demarco, came from an "anonymous source" reported by Ugo Pirro in the magazine Oggi in 1950. Actually, two detailed sources document the episode described by Saviano. A later and better-known one is by Carlo del Balzo, who describes the tragedy suffered by the Croce family in a book published shortly after the event: Cronaca del Tremuoto di Casamicciola ("Report on the Casamicciola Earthquake") (Naples: Carluccio, De Blasio & Co., 1883). Nevertheless, there is also a previous book drawn on by Carlo del Balzo, titled Ricordi. Casamicciola e le sue rovine. Cenni storici – Geografici – Cronologici ("Memories. Casamicciola and its ruins. Historical – Geographic – Chronological Accounts") (Naples: Prete, 1883.). The passage taken by del Balzo is the following:

"And at Casamicciola the son of Comm. Croce was dug out alive. He is the only survivor of the rich family from Foggia, which has been settled in Naples for a long time. He recounted that his mother and sister were found among the rubble and passed away. His father, who was writing with his son at the table when the quake struck, was completely covered by debris except for his head and told him – Offer 100 thousand lire to whoever can save us. – And then his voice could no longer be heard and he was completely buried. The young Croce had a fractured arm and leg."

A legal complaint between Roberto Saviano and TG1 resulted from this affair since TG1 had interviewed Marta Herling, who maintained that the writer had "invented" the episode of the 100,000 lire, without giving Saviano the right to reply. Feeling that he had been defamed, Saviano sued RAI for 4,700,000 euros in damages.

== Plagiarism dispute ==
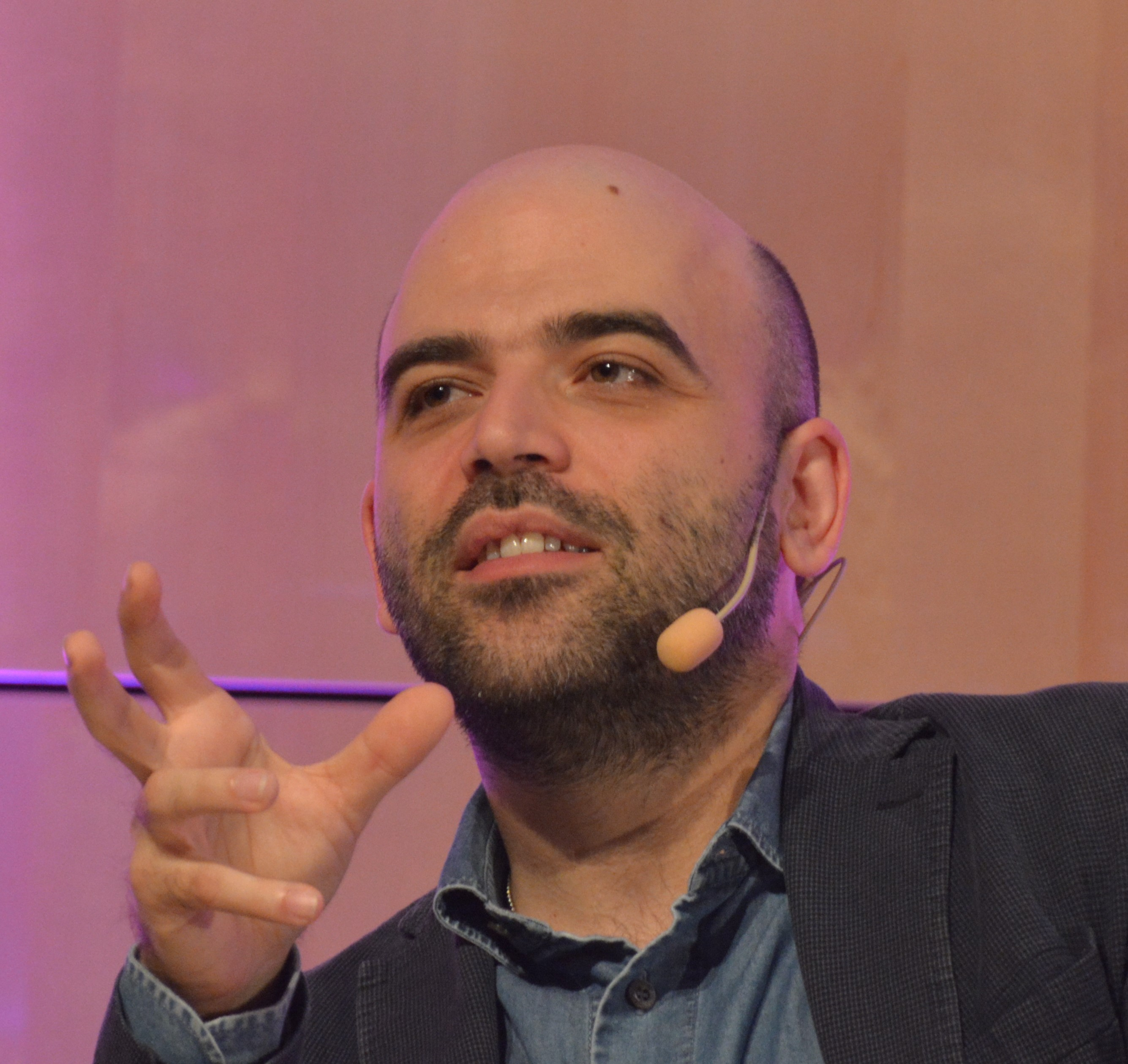
Saviano in 2017

In 2013, Saviano and the Arnoldo Mondadori Editore publishing house were sentenced for plagiarism on appeal. The Appeals Court of Naples recognized that some pages of Gomorrah (0.6% of the entire book) were the results of an illicit reproduction of some lines from two articles from local daily papers, Cronache di Napoli and Corriere di Caserta. Therefore, it partially modified the sentence from the first-degree court in which the court had rejected the accusations made by the two newspapers and had, instead, condemned them to pay damages for having "abusively reproduced" two of Saviano's articles (this sentence was confirmed in the appeal). In the appeal, the writer and Mondadori were ordered to jointly pay reparations for property and other damages of 60,000 Euros, plus a portion of legal costs. The writer appealed the ruling at the Court of Cassation, and the Supreme Court partially confirmed the sentence of the Appeals Court, but called for a reconsideration of the damages, evaluating 60,000 Euros to be an excessive sum for newspaper articles with a very limited readership. The Supreme Court did not agree with Saviano's appeal, rejecting almost all of the findings and largely confirming the basic structure of the Appeals Court's sentence.

In September 2015, journalist Michael C. Moynihan wrote an article for The Daily Beast, criticizing ZeroZeroZero and accusing Saviano of having used sections of text, including from Wikipedia, without citing his sources. In an article for the Italian newspaper La Repubblica, Saviano demonstrated how the passages from ZeroZeroZero and the presumed sources identified by Moynihan were manipulated in order to appear similar. The English newspaper The Guardian reported on the controversy with an article entitled "Roberto Saviano dismisses plagiarism claims over latest book", in which Saviano says, "I'm not a journalist (or a reporter), but, rather, a writer, and I recount real facts." Saviano adds that "Interpretations and theories have a provenance, not mere facts: those belong to all, to those who recount them and to those who read them, making them their own".

Among the various public personalities who have expressed their support of Roberto Saviano, the then-editor-in-chief of La Repubblica, Ezio Mauro, appeared in a video on the paper's website on 28 September 2015, to give his contribution to the "Saviano case". He repeated that "the facts of the news are available to all" and spoke about the "typical iconoclasm toward famous people who have constructed success and visibility based on their own hard work and studies." He continued by saying: "Saviano is paying for having an enormous following and, above all, for the fact that he hasn't remained comfortably in cultural obscurity."

== Television ==
On 8–29 November 2010, Roberto Saviano hosted the cultural programme Vieni via con me ("Come Away with Me") with Fabio Fazio on Rai 3. The programme had very successful ratings: the third episode was seen by 9,671,000 viewers, or 31.6% of the television audience that evening. The show covered themes such as organized crime, immigration, women's emancipation, politics, and serious problems in Italian society. The programme typically features the reading of "lists", with the goal of highlighting the issues addressed through a series of data. Numerous special guests appeared in the four episodes of the programme.

Beginning on 14 May 2012, Saviano hosted the programme Quello che (non) ho ("What I (don't) have"), once again with Fabio Fazio. It aired on La7 and was also streamed live on YouTube. The first episode was a record for La7, with 12.65%, or 3,036,000, viewers, and was the third most-watched programme of the evening. This record was surpassed two days later with the third and final episode of the programme, which registered 13.06% of viewers.

For four weeks from 4 October 2017, Saviano hosted the show Kings of Crime on the TV channel Nove, where he spoke of the major Italian and international bosses of the organized crime system.

== Awards and honours ==
- 2010 European Book Prize
- 2011 PEN/Pinter Prize
- 2011 Olof Palme Prize, together with Lydia Cacho.
- Bachelor's degree honoris causa in law - University of Genoa, 22 January 2011
- On 18 January 2012, Roberto Saviano was named honorary citizen of Milan.
- Asteroid 278447 Saviano, discovered by Italian amateur astronomer Silvano Casulli in 2007, was named in honour of Saviano's merits as a writer and journalist. The official naming citation was published by the Minor Planet Center on 6 April 2012 (M.P.C. 79108).
- On 7 June 2013, he officially received honorary citizenship of Florence from then-mayor Matteo Renzi.
- 2019 Oxfam Novib/PEN Award for Freedom of Expression

== Music ==
- British trip hop group Massive Attack wrote a song inspired by the story of Roberto Saviano and Gomorrah. Titled "Herculaneum", it was featured in the soundtrack for the film Gomorrah.
- Neapolitan rapper Lucariello wrote a song called "Cappotto di legno" (Wooden Coat) with music by Ezio Bosso. Before writing the song, Lucariello received Saviano's approval for it because it tells the story of a killer who is preparing to kill Saviano.
- The group Subsonica, from Turin, dedicated their song "Piombo" from the album L'eclissi to the writer.
- The end of the track "In Italia" by rapper Fabri Fibra contains part of Enzo Biagi's interview with Roberto Saviano, in which the writer states, "One of my dreams was to remain in my own land, to recount it and to continue—how can I say it—to resist".
- The same rapper refers to Saviano in another one of his pieces. In the track "Teoria e Pratica" from the EP Casus Belli, he says, "Who would you like as president? Me, Saviano!"
- The song "TammorrAntiCamorra", from the album Suburb by the rap group 'A 67, contains the line "smettiamo di essere Gomorra" ("Let's Quit Being Gomorrah"), and is dedicated to the priest don Giuseppe Diana, who was killed by the Camorra. In the song, Roberto Saviano reads a fragment of his book.
- During the U2 concert in Rome on 8 October 2010, Bono mentioned Roberto Saviano two times and dedicated the group's famous song "Sunday Bloody Sunday" to the writer. Saviano was at the concert and had met with the U2 frontman before the show.
- Fabri Fibra cites Saviano and his book Gomorrah once again in the track "Guerra e pace" ("War and Peace") on his eponymous 2013 album.
- Clementino also cites Saviano in the song "Mea Culpa", on the album of the same name.
- Saviano is cited by the Sardinian rapper Salmo in the track "Nella pancia dello squalo" ("In the Stomach of the Shark") on the album The Island Chainsaw Massacre.
- The journalist is cited in the track "Perdona e dimentica" ("Forgive and Forget") by I Cani. Saviano showed his appreciation for the one-man band, writing that his songs "are among the best stories of our country. Electronic anthropology."

The writer dedicated a section of his official site to music in the Galleries section.

== Bibliography ==
=== Books ===
- Gomorra. Viaggio nell'impero economico e nel sogno di dominio della camorra. Segrate: Mondadori. 2006. ISBN 978-88-04-56915-2 - ISBN 88-04-55450-9 (in Italian)
  - Gomorrah: A Personal Journey into the Violent International Empire of Naples' Organized Crime System. Farrar, Straus and Giroux. 2008. ISBN 978-03-7416-527-7
- Zero Zero Zero. Milan: Feltrinelli. 2013. ISBN 978-88-0703-053-6 (in Italian)
  - Zero Zero Zero. Penguin Press. 2015. ISBN 978-15-9420-550-7
- La paranza dei bambini. Milan: Feltrinelli. 2016. ISBN 978-88-0703-207-3 (in Italian)
  - The Piranhas: The Boy Bosses of Naples. Farrar, Straus, and Giroux. (2018). ISBN 978-03-7423-002-9
- Bacio feroce. Segrate: Mondadori. 2017 ISBN 978-88-0789-166-3 (in Italian)
  - Savage Kiss: A Novel. Farrar, Straus and Giroux. 2020. ISBN 978-03-7410-795-6
- Solo è il coraggio. Milan-Florence: Bompiani. 2022. ISBN 978-88-30-10168-5. (in Italian)
- Cuore puro. Florence: Giunti. 2022. ISBN 978-88-09-97786-0. (in Italian)

=== Short stories ===
- Il contrario della morte (2007)
- Super Santos (2012)

=== Comics ===
- Sono ancora vivo. Drawn by Asaf Hanuka. Milan: Bao Publishing. 2021. ISBN 978-88-32-73207-8. (in Italian)
  - I'm Still Alive. Drawn by Asaf Hanuka. Archaia. 2022. ISBN 978-16-8415-442-5.

==== "Le storie della paranza" ====
- I teschi dei ladri. With Tito Faraci. Drawn by Riccardo La Bella. Milan: Feltrinelli. 2021. ISBN 978-88-07-55037-9. (in Italian)
- Cosplayer. With Tito Faraci. Drawn by Riccardo La Bella. Milan: Feltrinelli. 2022. ISBN 978-88-07-55097-3. (in Italian)
- Ultima corsa. With Tito Faraci. Drawn by Riccardo La Bella. Milan: Feltrinelli. 2022. ISBN 978-88-07-55100-0. (in Italian)
- La memoria delle ossa. With Tito Faraci. Drawn by Riccardo La Bella. Milan: Feltrinelli. 2022. ISBN 978-88-07-55120-8. (in Italian)

=== Essays ===
- Beauty and the Inferno. Brooklyn, NY: Verso. 2012 [2009]. ISBN 978-18-4467-950-8.
- La parola contro la camorra. Turin: Einaudi. 2010 (published with DVD). ISBN 978-88-06-20218-7 (in Italian)
- Vieni via con me. Milan: Feltrinelli. 2011. ISBN 978-88-07-49110-8 (in Italian)
- In mare non esistono taxi. Milan: Contrasto Due. 2019. ISBN 978-88-69-65786-3. (in Italian)
- Cuore puro. Florence: Giunti. 2022. ISBN 978-88-301-0091-6. (in Italian)
- NarcoIslam. Pratiche mafiose del fondamentalismo islamico. Rome: Contrasto. 2023. ISBN 978-88-6965-683-5. (in Italian)

=== Audiobooks ===
- Se questo è un uomo (If This Is a Man) by Primo Levi, read in Italian by Roberto Saviano. Rome: Emons. 2013. ISBN 978-88-95703-93-0

=== Miscellaneous ===
- Preface to Anatole France's La rivolta degli angeli, Padua, Meridiano zero, 2004; 2009 (Italian edition of France's The Revolt of the Angels)
- A occhi aperti. Le nuove voci della narrativa italiana raccontano la realtà, et al., Milan Oscar Mondadori, 2008. ISBN 978-88-04-58356-1
- Raccontare la realtà. Un grande reporter americano incontra l'autore di Gomorra, con William Langewiesche, Rome, Internazionale, 2008 (publication of the conversation between Saviano and William Langewiesche at the Ferrara Internazionale literary festival, 2007)
- Introduction to Michael Herr, Dispacci, Milan, Bur, 2008 (Italian edition of Michael Herr's Dispatches)
- Preface to Raffaele Sardo's La bestia. Camorra storie di delitti, vittime e complici, Milan, Melampo, 2008
- La Ferita. Racconti per le vittime innocenti di camorra, Naples, ad est dell'equatore, 2009
- Preface to Nanni Balestrini's Sandokan, storia di camorra, Rome, DeriveApprodi, 2009
- Preface to Giuseppe Fava's Prima che vi uccidano, Milan, Bompiani, 2009
- Essay in Makeba: la storia di Miriam Makeba, Iesa, Goree, 2009 (Italian edition of Makeba: My Story)
- Introduction to Anna Politkovskaja, Cecenia. Il disonore russo, Rome, Fandango, 2009 (Italian edition of Anna Politkovskaya's A Small Corner of Hell: Dispatches from Chechnya)
- LiberaMente. Storia e antologia della letteratura italiana, et al., 3 voll., Palermo, Palumbo, 2010
- Preface to Andrea Pazienza's Astarte, Rome, Fandango, 2010
- Preface to Mario Gelardi's Liberami dal male. La vera storia di Marco Marchese, Naples, ad est dell'equatore, 2010
- Introduction to Joseph Conrad, La linea d'ombra, Rome, Gruppo Editoriale L'Espresso, 2011 (Italian edition of Joseph Conrad's The Shadow Line)
- Preface to Umberto Eco's Der ewige Faschismus, Munich, Hanser, 2020. ISBN 978-3-446-26576-9 (The Eternal Fascism, a collection of several of Eco's works, published in Italy as Il fascismo eterno and Migrazioni e intolleranza in 2018 and 2019, retranslated from the Italian, English, and French texts of Eco into German, with a preface by Saviano).

=== Journalism ===
- "Un sogno leghista", Nazione Indiana, 21 February 2003
- "Pasta, fagioli e clandestinità", Diario, 4 July 2003
- "La parola camorra non esiste", Nazione Indiana, 16 September 2003
- "L'infinita congettura", Nazione Indiana, 27 February 2004
- "La città di notte", Nazione Indiana, 22 March 2004
- "Annalisa. Cronaca di un funerale", Nazione Indiana, 9 April 2004
- "L'odiatore", Nazione Indiana, 4 May 2004 (an abridged version of this article was published in Pulp Libri in 2003)
- "Su Gustaw Herling", Nazione Indiana, 3 June 2004 (from Pulp Libri, n. 48)
- "Giancarlo Siani", Nazione Indiana, 11 June 2004
- "Mauro Curradi, scrittore d'Africa", Nazione Indiana, 17 July 2004 (from Pulp Libri, January 2003)
- "Vi racconto di Marano e dei due compari", Nazione Indiana, 5 August 2004
- "L'affermazione della libertà. Intervista a Mauro Curradi", Nazione Indiana, 24 August 2004
- "Kaddish per Enzo", Nazione Indiana, 27 August 2004
- "La bugia perenne", Nazione Indiana, 23 September 2004
- "Lettera a Federico Del Prete", Nazione Indiana, 13 October 2004
- "La brillante carriera del giovane di sistema", Nazione Indiana, 26 October 2004 (from Il manifesto, 24 October 2004)
- "Qui", Nazione Indiana, 23 November 2004
- "Il mestiere dei soldi", Nazione Indiana, 15 December 2004 (from Sud. Rivista di cultura, arte e letteratura, n. 3, December 2004)
- "Felicia", Nazione Indiana, 8 December 2004
- "Pandori e moda. La camorra spa", Nazione Indiana, 23 December 2004 (from Il manifesto, 16 December 2004)
- "Isaac Bashevis Singer", Nazione Indiana, 14 January 2005 (from Pulp Libri, n. 52, November–December 2004)
- "Boss e poeti", Nazione Indiana, 13 February 2005 (from Corriere della Sera - Corriere del Mezzogiorno, January 2005)
- "Giuliana Sgrena: quello che sta accadendo", by Sergio Nazzaro and Roberto Saviano, Nazione Indiana, 25 February 2005
- "33", Nazione Indiana, 14 March 2005 (from Corriere della Sera - Corriere del Mezzogiorno, 13 March 2005)
- "Ferdinando Tartaglia, Fenomenologia di un'eresia anarchica", Nazione Indiana, 10 April 2005 (from Pulp, n. 53, January–February 2005)
- "Il matriarcato", Nazione Indiana, 14 May 2005 (da Corriere della Sera - Corriere del Mezzogiorno, 16 April 2005)
- "Scrivere sul fronte meridionale. Lettera agli amici indiani", Nazione Indiana, 17 April 2005
- "La terra padre", Nazione Indiana, 2 June 2005 (from Nuovi Argomenti, n. 30, April–June 2005)
- "Io so e ho le prove", Nazione Indiana, 2 December 2005 (from Nuovi Argomenti, n. 32, October–December 2005)
- "Super santos, pali e capistazione", Nazione Indiana, 10 October 2005 (from Il pallone è tondo, edited by Alessandro Leogrande, L'ancora del mediterraneo, 2005)
- "Scampia Erzegovina" 13 July 2005 I Miserabili (from Generazioni. Nove per due, L'ancora del mediterraneo, 2005)
- "Langewiesche, scrittore d'aria, di terra e di mare", Nazione Indiana, 2 December 2005 (from Pulp Libri, n. 56, July–August 2005)
- "Inferno napoletano", L'espresso n. 36, 14 September 2006
- "Da Scampia si vede Pechino", L'espresso n. 38, 28 September 2006
- "E voi dove eravate", L'espresso n. 46, 21 November 2006
- "Quanto costa una parola", L'espresso n. 52, 4 January 2007
- "Vi racconto l'impero della cocaina", L'espresso n. 10, 15 March 2007
- "Spartani di George Bush", L'espresso n. 12, 29 March 2007
- "Guai a raccontare questo paese", L'espresso n. 15, 19 April 2007
- "Io sto con gli indiani", L'espresso n. 16, 23 April 2007
- Saviano, Roberto (6 March 2012). "TAV, da Napoli alla Val di Susa le mani della mafia sui cantieri". la Repubblica. Rome.
- — (7–20 March 2019). "The migrant caravan : made in USA". The New York Review of Books. 66 (4). Translated from the Italian by Geoffrey Brock: 14–16.

== Filmography ==
=== Director ===
- I'm Still Alive (TBA)

=== Creator ===
- Gomorrah (since 2014, directed by Stefano Sollima, Francesca Comencini, Claudio Cupellini, Claudio Giovannesi, Marco D'Amore)

=== Screenwriter ===
- Gomorrah (2008, directed by Matteo Garrone)
- Gomorrah (since 2014, directed by Stefano Sollima, Francesca Comencini, Claudio Cupellini, Claudio Giovannesi, Marco D'Amore)
- Piranhas (2019, directed by Claudio Giovannesi)
- I'm Still Alive (TBA)

=== Adaptations ===
- Tatanka (2011, directed by Giuseppe Gagliardi)
- ZeroZeroZero (2020, directed by Stefano Sollima, Janus Metz, Pablo Trapero)
- Gomorrah: The Origins (since 2026, created by Leonardo Fasoli and Maddalena Ravagli)

== Video games ==
- Gomorrah (Microsoft Windows, Android, iOS, 2023)
