= Michele Zagaria =

Italian crime boss

- Mug shot of Michele Zagaria
- Born: 21 May 1958 (age 68); San Cipriano d'Aversa, Campania, Italy
- Other name: Capastorta
- Occupation: Leader of the Casalesi clan
- Status: In prison in Italy
- Allegiance: Camorra / Casalesi clan
- Criminal charges: Murder and other crimes
- Penalty: Life in prison

Michele Zagaria (Italian pronunciation: [miˈkɛːle ddzaɡaˈriːa]; born 21 May 1958) is an Italian Camorrista and one of the bosses of the Casalesi clan from Casal di Principe in the province of Caserta northwest of Naples. He was nicknamed Capastorta, which translates to "twisted head", because of his violent reputation.

He was on the "most wanted list" of the Italian ministry of the Interior from 1995 until 2011, for Camorra association, murder, extortion, robbery and other crimes. On 8 February 2000, an international warrant was issued against him, to be arrested for extradition.

== Criminal career ==
The criminal career of Michele Zagaria, began in the 1980s, alongside Alberto Beneduce and Francesco Schiavone. His first arrest dates back to 1988, when he was found with a 7.65 submachine gun—the weapon of choice for soldiers of the Camorra—in his car. Since then he was in and out of jail, until, on 6 December 1995, the so-called Spartacus investigation identified him as one of the heads of the Casalesi clan. Since then he vanished from public life.

Zagaria is an atypical Casalesi boss. According to informants, he doesn't refuse a few lines of cocaine, a strict taboo within the clan. He insists on being treated like a priest: 'You should do what I say and not what I do.' He knows how to construct his image. Employees are allegedly received in extravagant villas and greeted with a tiger on a leash. Together with his brother Pasquale he has become the "king of tendering" in construction, getting public contracts for the high-speed train Tav, a new prison, the local rail line and a NATO radar base.

With Antonio Iovine, Zagaria represented the new face of management of the Camorra, forging strategic alliances with the Calabrian 'Ndrangheta. According to Roberto Saviano, the writer of Gomorrah about the Camorra, it was Zagaria's "business acumen" that had "enabled his companies to triumph throughout Italy". When it came to winning tenders by undercutting other companies, "Michele Zagaria and his construction firms know no rival".

== Convictions and arrest ==
He was sentenced, in absentia, to life on 15 January 2010, after 12-year trial—named the Spartacus Trial—against 36 members of the Casalesi clan, charged with a string of murders and other crimes.

Zagaria was arrested on 7 December 2011, when police raided a secret bunker in Casapesenna. "You won. Your state has won," Zagaria told police officers as he was arrested. He had been on the run for 16 years, living in his cramped quarters for years, emerging rarely. The arrest led to scenes of jubilation among the police officers. Some embraced; others gave the V for Victory sign and punched the air amid cries of "Long live the police. Long live legality."
