= Rosaria Capacchione =

Italian politician and journalist

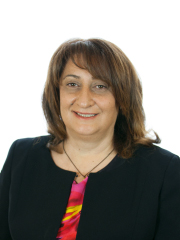

Member of the Senate of the Republic
- In office 19 March 2013 – 22 March 2018
- Constituency: Campania

Personal details
- Born: 16 February 1960 (age 66) Naples, Italy
- Party: Democratic Party

Rosaria Capacchione (born 16 February 1960) is an Italian politician and journalist, who served as an Italian Senator for the Democratic Party from 2013 to 2018. She has been a passionate investigative journalist against corruption and the Italian mafia.

== Early life ==
From 1985 to 31 March 2018 she worked for Il Mattino in Caserta and Naples. She also writes for the Fanpage.it website.

She is the author of The Gold of the Camorra.

In 2008, Cappacchione was described in The Guardian as "one of the bravest reporters in Italy".

Due to her job as a judicial reporter and for her activity against the Camorra, she has been repeatedly threatened with death over the years and for this she is forced to live under guard. Despite protection, in October 2008, raiders broke into her home and stole a plaque she had been awarded earlier this year in honour of her campaigning journalism.

In 2008 she received the prize "Archivio Disarmo - Golden Doves for Peace" awarded by IRIAD.

== Political career ==
Cappachione was a candidate on the Democratic Party's list in the southern constituency in the 2009 European elections. She received about 73,000 preferences but failed to reach the threshold to be elected to European Parliament. Capacchione then pointed the finger at her party, accusing them of not having supported her.

She stood as a candidate for the Democrat Party in the 2013 general election. In November 2013, Cappachione branded footballer Mario Balotelli 'an imbecile' for refusing to rule out links with the Italian mafia ahead of the World Cup qualifier between Italy and Armenia.

In the Senate of the Republic, she was a member of the parliamentary anti-mafia committee and secretary of the justice committee.

She was not re-nominated for the 2018 Italian general election, as she was excluded from the Democratic Party lists. She had announced her decision not to reapply in April 2016.
