= Christoph Huber =

Swiss cardiac surgeon

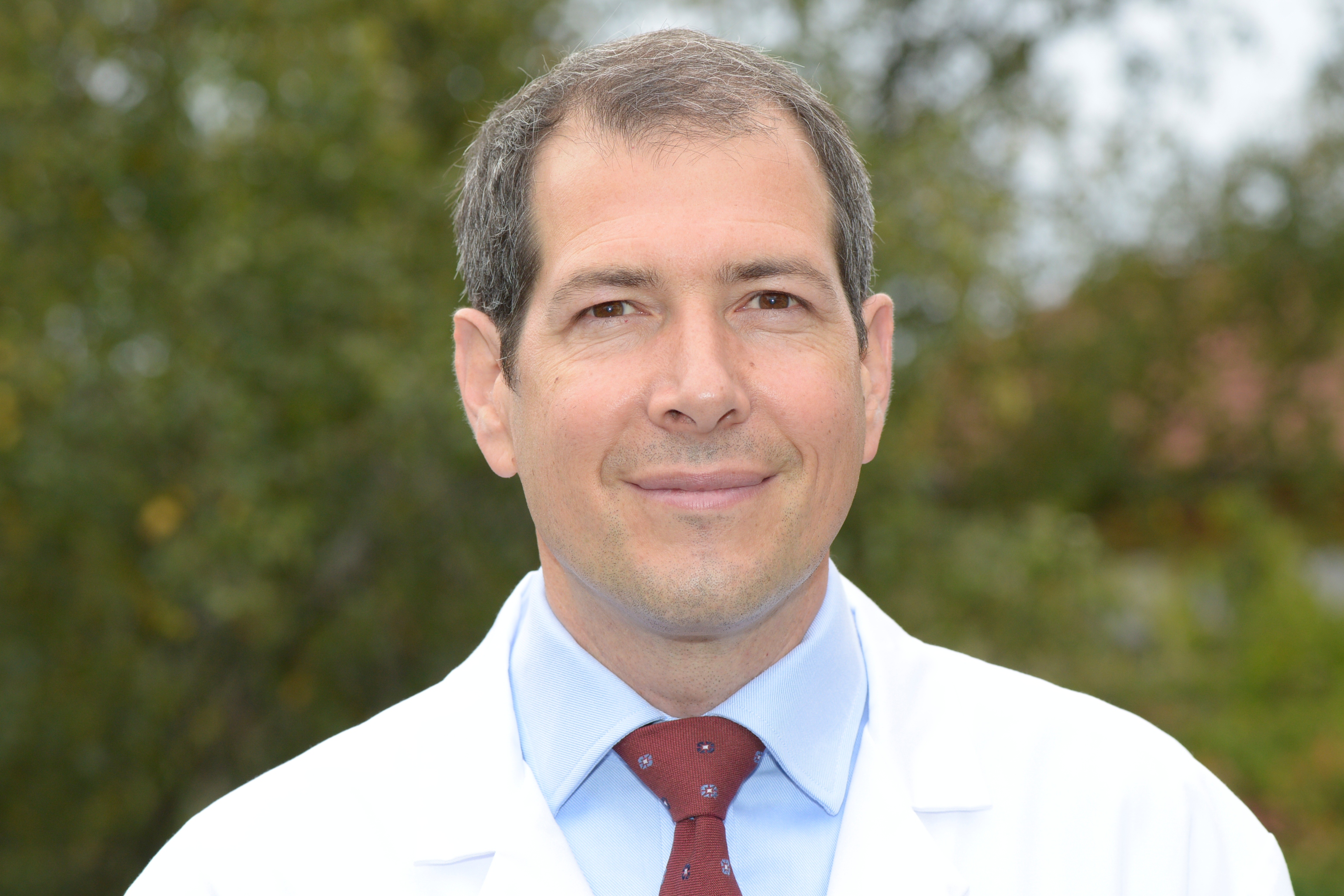
- Born: Liestal, Switzerland
- Occupations: Cardiac Surgeon; Medical device inventor; Author

Christoph Huber MD, FMH, FECTS is a Swiss cardiac surgeon who is a professor and the head of the Division of Cardiac and Vascular Surgery at the University Hospital Geneva, Switzerland.

Huber also maintains a research program, is an inventor, book author and entrepreneur, having founded the company Endoheart AG. He is the inventory of the transapical (TA) TAVI for cardiac surgery

== Biography ==
Christoph Huber completed his Dr. med. at the Bern University Medical School in Basel, Switzerland, his General Surgery Residency at the District Hospital Biel in Biel and his Cardiovascular Residency at the University Hospital Bern, Inselspital, Switzerland.

Between 2002-07/08, Huber attended the University Hospital Lausanne (including a senior cardiac surgical clinical fellowship 2004–05 at Brigham and Women's Hospital, Harvard Medical School, Boston, USA) and Great Ormond Street Hospital, London, UK (Senior Fellow Congenital Cardiac Surgery); returning to University Hospital Bern in 2009 as a Senior Consultant Cardiovascular Surgeon (MD, FMH), Director of the Surgical Transcatheter Valve Implantation (TAVI) Program, lecturer, and Medical Superintendent of adult cardiac surgery.

In 2016, Huber became the Head of Division Cardiac and Vascular Surgery (Médecin-chef de service) at the University Hospital Geneva (HUG). Huber also published a textbook on transcatheter valve therapies (TCVT) in 2009.

== Inventor ==
Huber developed the transapical (TA) TAVI in 2004 which introduced a less invasive antegrade, versus transfemoral/TF retrograde, approach to the heart, and his later research, into a percutaneous transapical TAVI platform, led to his invention of the first successful experimental closure device (TA Plug). Huber also opened a startup company and assisted in the development of the Acurate TA (Symetis) device which received CE approval in 2011.

== Awards ==
- Sept. 2014 - Swiss SIWF-Award: Distinction as best Swiss teacher for Cardiac Surgery
- May 2009 - National Research Prize, Swiss National Heart Foundation: In recognition for development of the transapical TAVI approach (Trans Catheter Valve Replacement of the Aortic Valve - The Direct Access Trans Apical Procedure)
- Sept. 2005 - St. Jude Medical/C Walton Lillehei Young Investigator's Award, EACTS (19th Annual Meeting, Barcelona, Spain)
- Feb. 2004 - ISES Peripheral Vascular Fellow's Forum Award (2004 Forum, Scottsdale, Arizona): For presentation of ‘New tools for new goals (Ultrasound navigation through the heart for off-pump aortic valved stent implantation)
- Oct. 2003 - St. Jude Medical/C. Walton Lillehei Young Investigator's Award, EACTS (17th Annual Meeting, Vienna, Austria): Do Valved Stent Compromise Coronary Flow?

== Societies ==
- Swiss Society of Thoracic-Cardiac and Vascular Surgery (SGHC - Board Member)
- European Association For Cardio-Thoracic Surgery (EACTS - Chair Acquired Cardiac Disease Domain/Moderator Techno College)
