= Luigi Vollaro =

- Luigi Vollaro behind bars during his 1982 trial.
- Born: December 18, 1932; San Sebastiano al Vesuvio, Italy
- Died: December 3, 2015 (aged 82); Milan, Italy
- Other name: 'o Califfo
- Occupations: Founder and head of the Vollaro clan
- Allegiance: Vollaro clan / Camorra
- Penalty: Life imprisonment

Luigi Vollaro (December 18, 1932 in San Sebastiano, province of Naples – December 3, 2015 in Milan) was a member of the Camorra, boss and founder of the Vollaro clan from Portici and San Sebastiano al Vesuvio.

== History ==
He founded the Vollaro clan during the mid-seventies. During his tenure as a Camorra boss, Vollaro earned the nickname "'o Califfo" (The Caliph) for his alleged unlimited sexual potency. When he eventually was arrested in 1982, the police found that Vollaro was living in a concubinage with 17 women and had 27 children. When asked by the judge whether he belonged to the Camorra, he replied: "What is the Camorra? A criminal organization, they say. I belong only to my family. I mate only with my women."

In 1982, Luigi Vollaro was arrested after spending three years on the run and was charged with the murder of Giuseppe Mutillo in 1980. Vollaro was later sentenced to life imprisonment for this murder. In 2003, Vollaro received a second life sentence for the murder of Carlo Lardone in 1977.

In 1992, Vollaro was subjected to the harsh Article 41-bis prison regime, thus having the distinction of being one of the first Camorra bosses to be subjected to this regime. For a short period after his arrest, the management of his illegal businesses went to his sons Pietro, Giuseppe and Raffaele. Another son, Antonio who had dissociated from the family business early on, was wrongly detained years for a murder committed by his brother Ciro. Ciro admitted to the murder after becoming a pentito (collaborator with Italian Justice) and with his confessions, dealt a massive blow to the clan's activities.
