= Gomorrah (book) =

2006 non-fiction book by Roberto Saviano

- Author: Roberto Saviano
- Original title: Gomorra
- Language: Italian/Neapolitan
- Genre: Nonfiction
- Publisher: Mondadori
- Publication date: 2006
- Publication place: Italy
- ISBN: 978-0-374-16527-7
- OCLC: 153578620
- Dewey Decimal: 364.1/060945 22
- LC Class: HV6453.I83 C42 2007

Gomorrah (Italian: Gomorra) is a book of investigative journalism conducted by Roberto Saviano and published in 2006, which documents Saviano's infiltration and investigation of a number of areas of business and daily life controlled or affected by the criminal organization known as the Camorra.

== Synopsis ==
The book describes the clandestine particulars of the business of the Camorra, a powerful Neapolitan mafia-like organization. In this book Saviano employs prose and news-reporting style to narrate the story of the Camorra, exposing its territory and business connections.

In an article in 2020, Saviano said "[w]e forget what Gomorrah really is: Gomorrah is not a mere synonym with Camorra, Gomorrah is an economic system wherein everything is missing, where there are no investments, no opportunities, no education, no jobs, no resources, no businesses."

Since 2006, following the publication of the book, Saviano has been threatened by several Neapolitan "godfathers." The Italian Minister of the Interior granted him a permanent police escort, but he has often been attacked by politicians of Berlusconi's cabinet. Also, his escort has been questioned.

As of December 2008, the book has sold almost 4 million copies worldwide.

The title of the book comes from a text by Giuseppe Diana, a parish priest in Casal di Principe who was killed by the Camorra in March 1994: "time has come to stop being a Gomorrah."

== Reception ==
Gomorrah won numerous literary prizes. In January 2009 the number of copies sold in Italy surpassed 2,000,000.

Gomorrah has been translated in 51 countries. It appeared in the best sellers’ lists of Germany, the Netherlands, Spain, France, Sweden and Finland. The New York Times has placed it amongst the most important books of 2007, while The Economist has included it among the hundred books of the year. Saviano is the only Italian to be placed in both lists.

Gomorrah was described by some critics and other Italian authors (such as Wu Ming, Carlo Lucarelli and Valerio Evangelisti) as part of a turbulent, heterogeneous stream in Italian writing called the New Italian Epic, whose representatives are particularly keen on producing not only novels and non-fiction narratives, but also real UNOs, Unidentified Narrative Objects. Gomorrah itself was described as a UNO by several critics, readers and writers.

== Theatrical, cinematic, television and video game adaptations ==
Gomorrah has been made into a play written by Saviano with Mario Gelardi and a 2008 film directed by Matteo Garrone and produced by Fandango. On 24 September 2008, the film was picked by ANICA (Italy's Association of the Cinematic and Audiovisual Industry) to represent Italy in the race for the Best Foreign Language Film Oscar nomination.

In reviewing Garrone's film adaptation of the book, Christoph Huber wrote: "With its interest in moving beyond the categories of novel or non-fiction, Saviano's work has been identified as part of a heterogeneous strain of national literature, subsumed as the New Italian Epic. A term that certainly isn't disgraced by Gomorrah, the film."

In 2014, the book was also loosely adapted as an eponymous television series.

In 2023, an official video game of the same name was released on Microsoft Windows, Android and iOS.
