= Spartacus Trial =

Italian trials of organized crime groups

The Court d'Assise President, Raimondo Romeres reads out the verdict of the final sentences on 19 June 2008. (Photo:EPA)

The Spartacus Trial (Italian: Processo Spartacus) was a series of criminal trials, each specifically directed against the activities of the powerful Casalesi clan of the Camorra. The trial was opened at the Corte d'Assise of Santa Maria Capua Vetere in Caserta. It was named after the historical gladiator, Spartacus (who led a rebellion of slaves beginning in old Capua against the ancient Roman Republic). The trial was initially chaired by its president, Catello Marano on 1 July 1998. It continued just over ten years, until its final verdict was eventually read on 19 June 2008.

== 36 members of the clan charged ==
In that 10-year legal trial, 36 members of the clan were charged with a string of murders and other crimes. The Casalesi clan had exploited and extorted from every business and economic opportunity, from waste disposal to construction, in creating a monopoly in the cement market for their own building businesses to the distribution of materials. Building business would have to pay for the contracts, buy material from the clan, and keep paying for protection. The clan also controlled elections.

== Sentences ==
All defendants were found guilty and 16 sentenced to life imprisonment including prominent Casalesi bosses, Francesco Schiavone and his chief lieutenant, Francesco Bidognetti. The other two bosses Antonio Iovine and Michele Zagaria were also given life sentences. They were on the list of most wanted fugitives in Italy, with international warrants for their arrest until Iovine was arrested on 17 November 2010, and Zagaria on 7 December 2011. The other Casalesi clan members who received life sentences were: Giuseppe Caterino, Cipriano D'Alessandro, Enrico Martinelli, Sebastiano Panaro, Giuseppe Russo, Walter Schiavone, Luigi Venosa, Vincenzo Zagaria, Alfredo Zara, Mario Caterino and Raffaele Diana.

== Murders of people involved in the trial and death threats ==
More than 1,300 people were investigated, 508 witnesses gave evidence and 626 were interviewed in the trial which saw the heaviest penalties ever for organised crime with a total of 700 years of imprisonment. Over the course of the initial trial and the appeal, five people involved in the case were murdered, including a court interpreter. A judge and two journalists were threatened with death. In all, 115 people were prosecuted, 27 life sentences, plus 750 years in prison were handed out to the defendants. On 15 January 2010, Italy's Supreme Court confirmed the sentence.
