= San Cipriano d'Aversa =

- Comune
- Comune di San Cipriano d'Aversa
- Coat of arms

- Location within Italy Location within Campania
- Coordinates: 41°0′N 14°8′E
- Country: Italy
- Region: Campania
- Province: Caserta (CE)

Government
  - Mayor: Vincenzo Caterino

Area
  - Total: 6.2 km^{2} (2.4 sq mi)

Population (31 December 2010)
  - Total: 13,085
  - Density: 2,100/km^{2} (5,500/sq mi)
- Demonym: Sanciprianesi
- Time zone: UTC+1 (CET)
  - Summer (DST): UTC+2 (CEST)
- Postal code: 81036
- Dialing code: 081
- Patron saint: St. Cyprianus
- Saint day: September 16

San Cipriano d'Aversa (Italian pronunciation: [san tʃiˈprjaːno daˈvɛrsa]) is an Italian commune and municipality in the Province of Caserta, region of Campania, located about 20 kilometres (12 mi) northwest of Naples and about 20 kilometres (12 mi) southwest of Caserta. The town is located on the territory of Agro aversano, a rural area with 19 comunes spread on its land, and is directly linked to the comune of Casal di Principe on a side, to the comune of Casapesenna on the other side.

San Cipriano d’Aversa is also known for the export of buffalo mozzarella and for the strong presence of organised crime.
