= Casalesi clan =

Criminal organization

- Founded: 1970s
- Founded by: Antonio Bardellino
- Founding location: San Cipriano d'Aversa
- Years active: 1970s -present
- Territory: Italy: Caserta, Giugliano in Campania, Emilia-Romagna; Presence also in Spain, Romania, Switzerland and Dominican Republic
- Criminal activities: extortion, drug trafficking, arms trafficking, racketeering, money laundering
- Allies: Alfieri clan (defunct); Galasso clan (defunct); Mallardo clan Catania Mafia family
- Rivals: Nuova Camorra Organizzata (defunct); Nuvoletta clan La Torre clan (defunct); Lubrano-Ligato clan

The Casalesi clan is a clan within the Camorra, an Italian criminal organization, operating from San Cipriano d'Aversa in the Province of Caserta. Formed by Antonio Bardellino, it is a confederation of clans in the Caserta area. The Casalesi clan is believed to be one of the most powerful groups within the Camorra, specialising in construction and keeping a lower profile than clans that focus on drug dealing.

== History ==
In the 1980s, Bardellino realized that cocaine, not heroin, would become the more profitable drug and organized a trafficking operation smuggling it from Latin America to Aversa via a fish flour import-export business. Heroin was smuggled as well, and shipments to the Gambino crime family were concealed inside espresso filters. When one shipment was intercepted by the authorities, Bardellino reportedly called John Gotti and told him, "Don't worry, now we're sending twice as much another way".

During the Camorra war of the 1980s, the Casalesi sided with Nuova Famiglia against Raffaele Cutolo. In one incident, Casalesi members positioned a machine gun on a hill in Ponte Annicchino and opened fire, killing four Cutolo members. After the Casalesi achieved dominance in their area following the defeat of Cutolo, Antonio Bardellino settled in Santo Domingo with his family. But unrest grew within the Casalesi.

Heading up the clan's military operations were Francesco Schiavone and Francesco Bidognetti. They thought Bardellino's right-hand man, Mario Iovine, was too close to Bardellino and did not approve of their plans for autonomy. They convinced Bardellino to order the murder of Iovine's brother, and then told Iovine that Bardellino had his brother killed based purely on a rumour. Iovine murdered Bardellino in retaliation in his Brazilian villa in 1988, meeting him under the pretext of discussing their cocaine operation. Several men loyal to Bardellino were subsequently murdered.

Francesco Schiavone took over as leader. In 1990, Vincenzo De Falco tipped off authorities against Schiavone. This led to a war between Schiavone's men and those loyal to another boss, Vincenzo De Falco, who was machine-gunned to death in 1991. Mario Iovine was also killed by De Falco's hitmen with revolver bullets while in a telephone booth in Portugal. The war lasted four years. The clan was heavily involved in the Naples waste management crisis that dumped toxic waste around Campania in the 1990s and 2000s; the boss of the clan, Gaetano Vassallo, admitted to systematically working for 20 years to bribe local politicians and officials to gain their acquiescence to dumping toxic waste. In March 2004, Francesco Schiavone's cousin, Francesco Cicciariello Schiavone, was arrested in Poland and charged with 10 homicides, three kidnappings, nine attempted homicides and extortion.

== Spartacus trial ==
Following his arrest, all the police investigations into the clan were grouped together in the Spartacus Trial. Over 1,300 people were investigated and 500 witnesses took the stand. The trial against 36 members of the Casalesi clan finally concluded on June 19, 2008, after 10 years. Over the course of the trial five people involved in the case were murdered, including an interpreter. A judge and two journalists received death threats.

All defendants were found guilty, and 16 were sentenced to life imprisonment. Francesco Schiavone, his lieutenant, Francesco Bidognetti, Antonio Iovine and Michele Zagaria were given life sentences.

== Current status ==
The clan was jointly ruled by Michele Zagaria and Antonio Iovine until the latter's capture and arrest on November 17, 2010. The clan was then led solely by Zagaria, until he too was captured on December 7, 2011. He was found in a bunker near his home province. The Casalesi clan is heavily involved in the cement and milk industries as well as the international drug trade, supplying drugs to the Mafia in Palermo and having alliances with Albanian mobsters and Nigerian crime syndicates. Their total assets are estimated to be worth around 30 billion euros.

In 2010, Italian authorities have uncovered a criminal alliance between the Casalesi clan and the Catania Mafia family, headed by the Santapaola-Ercolano faction, forming what investigators describe as a price-fixing cartel in the fruit and vegetable transport sector across Central and Southern Italy. In a major operation led by the Caserta police and Naples’ Anti-Mafia Directorate, around 60 individuals were arrested, including key members of the Casalesi, Licciardi, and Mallardo clans, as well as the Santapaola clan. Among those detained was Giuseppe Ercolano, brother-in-law of boss Nitto Santapaola and head of the transport company allegedly at the center of the scheme. The investigation revealed that the criminal network imposed a monopoly on the transport of produce, particularly from the Fondi market, one of Europe’s largest, forcing traders to use a single Sicilian company managed by Ercolano. The operation also led to the arrest of Paolo Schiavone, son of imprisoned boss Francesco Schiavone, during his honeymoon cruise.

On September 18, 2008 six African immigrants were shot dead at Castel Volturno in what is believed to be a dispute between the Casalesi and immigrant drug gangs. A riot followed the next day, and the Italian government deployed 500 troops in the area to deal with the outbreak of Camorra violence.

The clan is now led by those who were never arrested and those who have been released. The activity of the clan is proven by the continuous arrests that continue to take place today.
