= Casal di Principe =

- Comune
- Comune di Casal di Principe
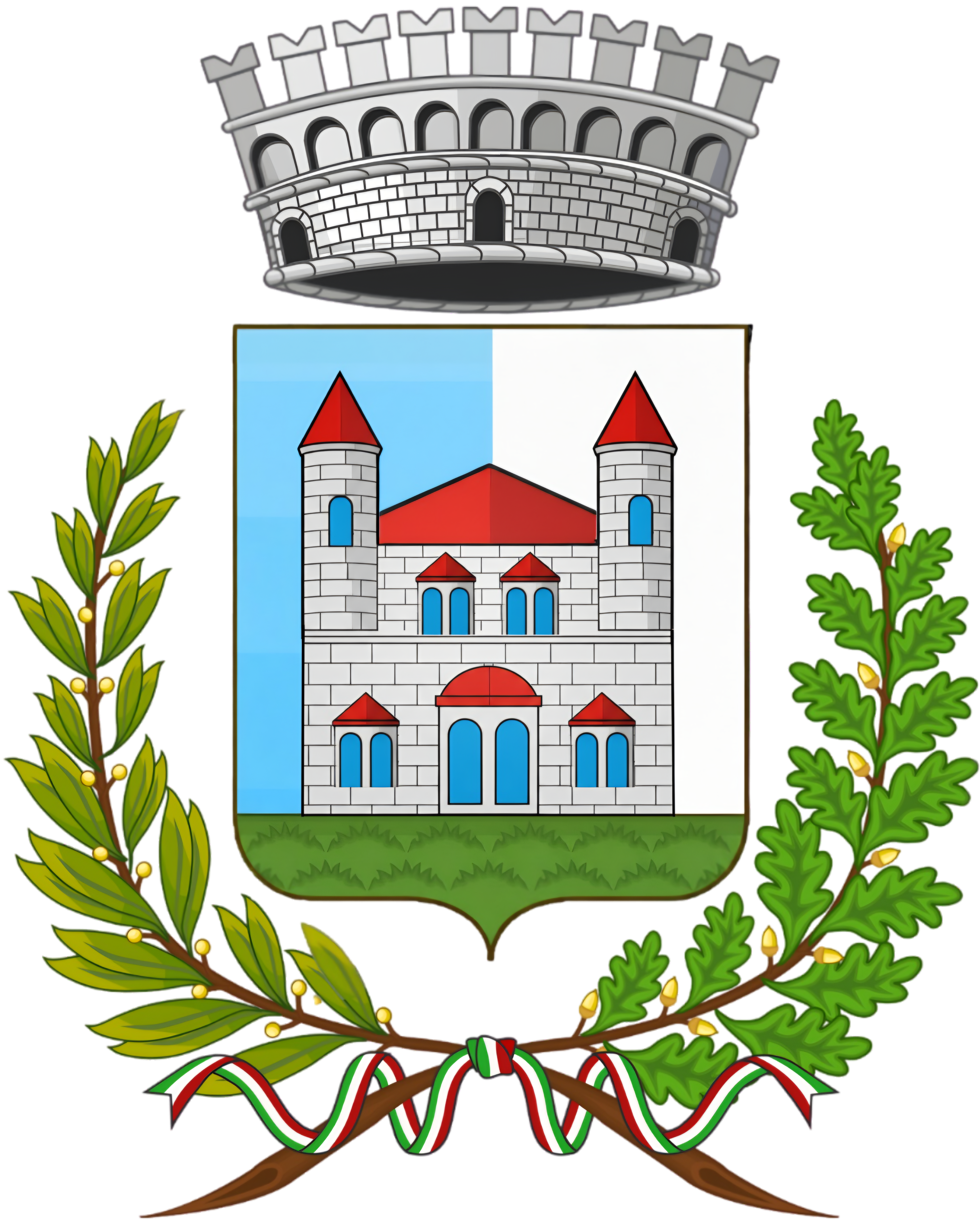
- Coat of arms

- Location within Italy Location within Campania
- Coordinates: 41°1′N 14°8′E
- Country: Italy
- Region: Campania
- Province: Caserta (CE)

Government
  - Mayor: Ottavio Corvino

Area
  - Total: 23.4 km^{2} (9.0 sq mi)
- Elevation: 68 m (223 ft)

Population (1 January 2015)
  - Total: 21,374
  - Density: 913/km^{2} (2,370/sq mi)
- Demonym: Casalesi
- Time zone: UTC+1 (CET)
  - Summer (DST): UTC+2 (CEST)
- Postal code: 81033
- Dialing code: 081
- Patron saint: Maria SS. Preziosa
- Saint day: September 12
- Website: Official website

Casal di Principe (Campanian: Casale 'i Princepe or simply Casale) is a comune (municipality) in the Province of Caserta in the Italian region of Campania, located about 25 kilometres (16 mi) northwest of Naples and about 20 kilometres (12 mi) southwest of Caserta. It has a population of approximately 21,000 people. The town is located on the territory of Agro aversano - a rural area with 19 comunes spread on its land, and is directly linked to the comune of San Cipriano d'Aversa.

Casal di Principe is also known for the export of buffalo mozzarella and organised crime.
