= List of Gomorrah episodes =

Gomorrah (Italian: Gomorra - La serie) is an Italian crime drama television series created and produced by Roberto Saviano, based on Saviano's book of the same name. It originally aired on the Sky Italia network on 6 May 2014, and ran for five seasons, ending on 17 December 2021. It premiered in the United Kingdom on Sky Atlantic on 4 August 2014, and in the United States on SundanceTV on 24 August 2016. The series has also been sold in 190 countries worldwide.

The show tells the story of Ciro Di Marzio (Marco D'Amore), a member of the Savastano clan, headed by Pietro Savastano (Fortunato Cerlino), a high-ranking member. Ciro aims to navigate the dangers of the criminal world, while also fighting a brutal civil war. The title is a play on the Neapolitan crime syndicate Camorra, and the show is set and filmed in Naples. The Savastano family also consists of his wife Immacolata (Maria Pia Calzone) and son, Gennaro (Salvatore Esposito). The show also features rival crime boss Salvatore Conte (Marco Palvetti), while introducing the characters Annalisa Magliocca (Cristina Donadio), Patrizia Santore (Cristiana Dell'Anna), Giuseppe Avitabile (Gianfranco Gallo), Enzo "Sangueblù" Villa (Arturo Muselli), Gerlando Levante (Gianni Parisi), Michelangelo "Mickey" Levante (Luciano Giugliano) and Federico Maccauro (Carmine Paternoster) in the show's later seasons.

== Series overview ==
Season	Episodes	Originally released	
Season	Episodes	First released	Last released
1	12	6 May 2014	10 June 2014
2	12	10 May 2016	14 June 2016
3	12	17 November 2017	22 December 2017
4	12	29 March 2019	3 May 2019
5	10	19 November 2021	17 December 2021

== Episodes ==
=== Season 1 (2014) ===
No. overall	No. in season	Title	English title translation	Directed by	Original release date	Italy viewers (millions)
1	1	"Il clan dei Savastano"	"The Savastanos"	Stefano Sollima	6 May 2014	3.82
Ciro Di Marzio - "the Immortal" - and Attilio, Camorristi of the Savastano clan, are stopped at a petrol pump to fill a canister; Ciro comments negatively on the order he is about to execute. Don Pietro Savastano is the head of a bloodthirsty Camorra branch in the Scampia neighbourhood, while Salvatore Conte is one of his connections who handles hashish traffic on his behalf. Due to the continuous rivalries between the two bosses, Don Pietro orders his right-hand man Ciro and Attilio to set fire to Conte's house, as a punishment. The fire causes a series of retaliations, one of which almost kills Ciro. Don Pietro's next order is to invade Conte's base and kill him and his whole clan. Conte manages to escape and flee to Spain, while four Don Pietro affiliates are killed, including Ciro's mentor and father-figure, Attilio. Gennaro "Genny" Savastano, the son of the boss Pietro and his wife Imma, is an immature and superficial young man. On the evening of the fire at Conte's house, Genny goes to a nightclub in Casavatore, where he takes a strong liking to a girl, Noemi, who is related to a rival boss.
2	2	"Ti fidi di me?"	"Do You Trust Me?"	Stefano Sollima	6 May 2014	3.34
The Guardia di Finanza stops an important shipment of drugs from Honduras. Don Pietro suspects a traitor inside the clan. Meanwhile, Don Pietro tries to patch up the trouble created by Genny, because he needs the Casavatore family's support to manage and continue to expand his criminal business. The Casavatore boss proposes a gesture that would publicly humiliate Genny. Don Pietro reacts by ordering the death of the Casavatore boss; he also urges Genny to become a murderer in order to prove he is ready to lead. Ciro goes with Genny: he captures an outcast drug addict and orders Genny to kill him. Genny lacks the will to hurt him, so Ciro is forced to deliver the killing shot. Genny lies to his father, claiming he shot the addict, and receives a new motorcycle as a reward. In the evening, Don Pietro catches Ciro also lying about the killing and punishes him by forcing him to drink his urine, to confirm his absolute submission and obedience. In the middle of the night, Genny rides his motorcycle at high speed ignoring road signs and traffic lights and is subsequently hit by a car and taken to hospital. Don Pietro receives a call about the accident and drives towards the hospital at high speed. A traffic police patrol stops him and finds a bag of money in the boot of the car and cocaine in a borrowed jacket.
3	3	"L'omm 'e casa"	"The Man of the House"	Stefano Sollima	13 May 2014	2.98
Don Pietro is detained at the Poggioreale prison. The boss continues to communicate with and command his clan with an illegally procured mobile phone. Ciro and Genny go to Milan to deliver a large sum of money to Franco Musi, the accountant, who for years has managed and laundered the clan's money. On visiting day at the prison, Don Pietro tells Genny to be ready to take command of the clan - even though Donna Imma is doubtful because of her son's immaturity.
4	4	"Sangue africano"	"African Blood"	Stefano Sollima	13 May 2014	2.69
The Savastano clan comes into conflict with a gang of Nigerian drug-dealers. They demand higher profit margins from the sale of the drugs from the Savastanos due to the stresses of dealing with crack addicts. The Nigerian ringleader urges one of his collaborators to be deliberately arrested in order to speak and deal directly with Don Pietro in prison. Don Pietro is annoyed and angry at the requests of the Nigerians and threatens deadly consequences if the drug dealing does not resume immediately and on his terms. Don Pietro is tired of the restrictions and the rigorous rules imposed by the prison warden. The clan's lawyer has not yet managed to find a legal pretext why the boss could be released. So the boss triggers a riot to intimidate the prison warden and asks the Nigerians for help, promising an increase in drug dealing profits in return. The revolt ends as soon as Don Pietro manages to obtain some privileges and the removal of some prison restrictions. In the evening the boss orders his loyalists by phone to kill residents of the African quarter. The ambush is performed during the night. The next day Don Pietro is subjected to the 41 bis regime because the call from the previous evening was intercepted.
5	5	"Il ruggito della leonessa"	"The Roar of the Lioness"	Francesca Comencini	20 May 2014	2.59
The Savastano clan is in financial difficulties after the arrest of Don Pietro, the revolt of the Nigerians and the seizure of the expected drugs. Imma and Genny leave for Milan again to meet the accountant Musi and get the money they need. The accountant acted without the clan's knowledge investing all the liquidity in a company that has now lost a multi-million dollar contract, causing its value to collapse. Desperate, Franco Musi tries to corrupt the public official who manages the contract. The attempt fails and the accountant ends up in prison. Genny continues to be detached from the family business and thinks only of Noemi. Imma decides to take command of the clan herself, disobeying her husband's orders. Imma effects Musi's release from prison. The accountant is free and is invited to a dinner with Imma. The boss's wife announces that she wants her money back and orders the accountant to commit suicide to stop the investigation of him that could compromise the assets and the money of the Savastano clan. Imma goes to visit her husband who is detained on 41 bis regime. Don Pietro tells his wife that Genny is the new Savastano boss and that he must be helped by Ciro. Imma reluctantly seems to accept her husband's will, but then tells Ciro he needs to go to Spain upon her husband's request.
6	6	"Roulette spagnola"	"Spanish Roulette"	Stefano Sollima	20 May 2014	2.62
Imma ignores her husband's orders and continues to command the Savastano clan. Imma orders Ciro to go to Barcelona on an extremely dangerous mission to reach a truce with Salvatore Conte, who has now become one of the major drug traffickers in southern Europe. Genny is sent to Honduras to calm the drug producers who have not yet been paid and to form a new agreement. Ciro is at the Barcelona airport when Massimo, Conte's driver, picks him up. Ciro is placed in one of the most important hotels in the Catalan city and is informed that Conte cannot currently attend to him. The next day Ciro threatens Massimo and meets Salvatore Conte. Conte has not forgotten the fire at his mother's house and leaves Ciro well offshore in the sea after having invited him onto his yacht tour. After some time, another boat sent by Conte picks Ciro out of the water, and Conte requires him to become his spokesman to make arrangements with a dangerous Russian clan that is threatening his business, with the guarantee of a long collaboration with the Savastano clan if he is successful. After closing the deal (at the price of a dramatic participation in Russian roulette), Ciro returns to Italy and discovers that Imma is distorting the clan's internal balance by taking absolute control of the local territory. Don Pietro calls his wife after learning that his will has not been respected. Imma convinces her husband to leave her in command of the clan since she herself is the only person she can truly trust and who has been with him at every moment of life.
7	7	"Imma contro tutti"	"Imma Against All"	Francesca Comencini	27 May 2014	2.90
The first drug supplies arrive from Spain. Imma orders the opening of a new market for drug dealing and makes fierce competition for all the other Camorra families, which risks retaliation. Ciro receives the humiliating order to manage the drug spot operations relating to the sales in the new square, accepting with reluctance and resentment. Imma is contacted by Marta Giacobone, a girl seeking protection after her father's suicide due to the growing demands for money from the usurer Leccalecca. The loan shark is killed by the clan, and Marta provides the family apartment located in a strategic point for the control of the market square. There have been no reports from Genny in Honduras for two weeks. Marta is killed, and at night, a police raid dismantles the Savastano clan's drug spot in the square. Imma calls a summit with the heads of rival families to offer them a truce. She informs the other bosses that Savastano has the exclusive right to import drugs and that they are the only ones who can sell quality goods at low prices. The truce proposal states that other families will have to confide in her and submit to her conditions. During sleep, Imma is awakened by some sudden noises and a gunshot at home. She goes to the entrance and discovers that Genny, who has come back tired and deeply changed, has shot her dog for having bitten him.
8	8	"La scheda bianca"	"The Blank Ballot"	Claudio Cupellini	27 May 2014	2.72
Honduras has transformed Genny into a proud and violent man. He is intent on demonstrating to the old members of the clan that he is now the new boss and then convenes a meeting in a restaurant. When the summit is over, Genny shoots the waiter, an old school friend of his for an unfortunate joke, but the other men are skeptical. Ciro wants to take on an increasingly important role in the management of the clan and tries to win over Genny, but sees his ambitions destroyed when Genny tells him that there is no place for him at the top of the clan. Genny, meanwhile, starts a relationship with a new girl, Jessica. Genny argues with his mother and confesses that he was forced to quarter a man with a machete because he complained too much. His experiences have made him a violent criminal with a yearning for omnipotence. Imma congratulates him. Genny has command of the clan and begins to assert himself through the control of politics. The city of Giugliano is considered very strategic for the clan's business and Genny wants to dominate it at all costs, despite the mayor being faithful to Don Pietro. Michele is a town councilor of Giugliano with a weak and manipulable character and he is also a friend of Genny. Through a combination of electoral cheating and death threats, Michele becomes Giugliano's mayor, forcing out the previous mayor. Ciro meditates revenge against the Savastano and begins to disseminate doubts and uncertainties among the senior members of the clan to put them against Genny. Meanwhile, Daniele, a 16-year-old mechanic fascinated by the perverse world of the Camorra, is manipulated by Ciro to become a drug courier in exchange for money and expensive goods.
9	9	"Gelsomina Verde"	"Green Jasmine"	Claudio Cupellini	3 June 2014	2.94
Genny orders the new mayor of Giugliano to carry out a major building project on which the Savastano will be able to exercise a strong hold. Tonino Russo is also involved in the project, an unscrupulous entrepreneur connected to Salvatore Conte. The building project is stopped due to the Romano brothers refusing to sell their car store located in the area where the project will be carried out. Genny orders Ciro to solve the problem of the Romano brothers, and he kills them. Ciro instructs Daniele to kill Tonino Russo, whose importance is downplayed by Ciro, in return for a large sum of money and an expensive motorcycle. With the money he received from Ciro, Daniele gives his 15-year-old girlfriend Manu an engagement ring decorated with a diamond crown. Daniele kills Tonino Russo and decides to spend the evening in a bar with Manu, disobeying Ciro's order to return home immediately. A TV news channel reports the killing of Tonino Russo, and Daniele learns that Russo was a leading man in the Salvatore Conte clan. Daniele leaves Manu alone at the bar and approaches home quietly where he overhears Rosario there discussing killing him. Fearing for his life, Daniele runs away and asks for help from his friend Bruno, who offers him a secluded place to shelter for the night and agrees to collect Manu from the bar. Before he can do this, Ciro arrives at the bar to look for Daniele, and pretending to be Bruno, he invites Manu into his car. Ciro kidnaps and tortures her for information about the current location of Daniele. When she can offer no information, he kills and burns her. The next morning, Daniele moves to a new hiding place, stopping first at a diner where he sees more TV news that reports the death of Manu. Salvatore Conte leaves Spain to return to Naples to personally deal with the assassination of Tonino Russo. Convinced that he no longer has any way out, Daniele points his gun into his mouth.
10	10	"Ora facciamo i Conte"	"Now We Get Conte"	Claudio Cupellini	3 June 2014	2.51
Genny, not suspecting Ciro's betrayal, entrusts him with the task of finding Tonino Russo's murderer. The young boss is worried that the agreements with Salvatore Conte are compromised by the killing. Daniele, who has gone into hiding in an abandoned place where his father once worked, finally manages to phone his older brother Massimo, the driver of Conte, and admits what has happened. Ciro cannot find Daniele and, fearing discovery, he tells Genny that Russo's murderer is probably a member of the Savastano clan. He promises to find Daniele and deliver him to Genny. Massimo acts impulsively to save his brother's life and tries to kill Conte. After a brief struggle, Massimo loses, and confesses to Conte the actions of his brother, deceived by Ciro. Salvatore Conte assures Massimo that his brother has nothing to fear. Massimo calls Daniele back and informs him that the problem has been solved and to wait at the farmhouse until Conte arrives. Daniele comes out of hiding when they arrive and confesses that Ciro Di Marzio ordered him to kill Russo. Conte invites him for a hug to obtain forgiveness in a merciful gesture, however, in the embrace Conte suddenly produces a gun and shoots him in the head, and also fires at Massimo as he speeds off.
11	11	"100 modi per uccidere"	"100 Ways to Kill"	Stefano Sollima	10 June 2014	3.08
At Daniele's funeral, the young members of the Savastano gang gather in front of the church and chant in his honour. Bruno flees to Marseille, and Massimo is seen succumbed to his wounds in his car. Genny convenes a meeting between the men of the old guard and the new generation of the clan. Genny wants Conte punished for killing a member of the Savastanos, and says he must be found immediately. The young people agree with Genny's plan, while the elders are against it; Zecchinetta, one of the most faithful of Don Pietro, denies the hypothesis that Salvatore Conte is trying to corrupt the members of the Savastano clan. Alone, Ciro tells Genny that he suspects Zecchinetta has already allied himself with Conte, and Genny orders his murder. From his safe house, Conte is talking to his gang stating that his only goal is to get rid of Genny Savastano. The meeting is also attended by three older members of the Savastano clan ('o Baroncino, 'o Fringuello and 'o Zingaro). The old guard are furious at the attitude of the new boss and cannot stand the lack of respect from the young guard. Genny visits his father in prison, and is shocked when he sees his father in a catatonic state. The old guard kill Tonino "Spiderman", a big-mouthed one of Genny's boys. Bruno sent a cell phone home with a conversation stored in it. Bruno's mother informs Imma. Manu had phoned Bruno at the time that Ciro picked her up, and her interaction with him was recorded. Ciro's voice can be heard threatening and torturing her for information related to Daniele's location, proof that Ciro is the traitor to the Savastano clan. Imma copies the call on a CD, entrusting it to her friend Marina, who promises to deliver it to the family lawyer to give to Genny should Imma be killed. The next day, she asks Ciro to meet her and makes him listen to the phone call recorded on Bruno's phone. She accuses him of treason, but says if he organises an ambush to kill Salvatore Conte, she will let him live if he then leaves Naples permanently. Imma tells Ciro that her lawyer will give a recording of the call to Genny should she be killed. Nevertheless, she is killed shortly after she leaves. Marina has been killed too, and Rosario takes the CD from her and destroys it. Ciro meets Salvatore Conte and proposes an alliance.
12	12	"Gli Immortali"	"The Immortals"	Stefano Sollima	10 June 2014	3.79
Don Pietro is in a catatonic state and does not react when prison officials tell him that his wife is dead. At home, Genny finds an envelope with "for my Genny" written on it in his mother's closet, and an enclosed CD. Genny listens to it and now knows that Ciro betrayed the clan and is responsible for his mother's death. Suspicious that Genny knows all, Ciro decides to flee, ordering his wife and daughter to pack as soon as possible to leave Naples. Meanwhile, Genny's boys arrive and surround Ciro's house, but Ciro and family manage to escape over the roof and take refuge in a house outside the city. Genny orders all the old members of the clan killed, and Malammore is the only one who survives, one of the closest and most faithful men to Don Pietro. Ciro returns to Naples to meet with Conte, who he manages to convince that he is able to get Genny out in the open so that he can kill him. It is known that Ciro will accompany his daughter to a concert. Genny falls into Ciro's trap and enters the concert hall alone while he orders his men to surround the outer perimeter of the building. He enters the auditorium to personally kill Ciro. Before they can reach the concert hall, Conte and his men ambush Genny's boys. Ciro, realising that Genny has managed to get to the concert hall, flees with his wife and daughter, but before they can manage to leave the auditorium, Genny makes his entrance. As chaos ensues due to fleeing frightened parents, Ciro shoots Genny several times. Thinking he is dead, Ciro runs out with his daughter in his arms while his wife Deborah angrily accuses him of having used them as bait. Deborah takes the child and leaves with her. Due to his mental state, Don Pietro is about to be transferred to a different prison. On the road, the transfer van is ambushed by masked men who open fire and kill all the prison officers. Once Don Pietro is reached, one of the assailants takes off his mask — it was Malammore who came to free him. Don Pietro is freed, and enters a car with Malammore. Meanwhile, as Genny lies on the floor of the concert hall in a pool of blood, his right hand twitches.

=== Season 2 (2016) ===
No. overall	No. in season	Title	English title translation	Directed by	Original release date	Italy viewers (millions)
13	1	"Vita mia"	"My Life"	Stefano Sollima	10 May 2016	4.27
Genny is on the brink of death as doctors try to stabilise him. In Naples, Ciro and Salvatore Conte and their respective allies are negotiating for the division of the spoils left by Don Pietro. The division of the market squares is unanimously accepted as a master plan among the old members of the Savastano clan, and by Conte's men. The police investigate the shooting in the concert hall, and believe Ciro Di Marzio was responsible. Ciro hires a similar-looking man to confess to the police as being responsible for the shooting and go to jail on his behalf. Ciro reassures his wife Deborah that they can resume normal life. Deborah can no longer stand to be around her husband's criminal actions and continues to feel in constant danger. Deborah decides to take their child and return to take refuge in the previous hideout. Ciro joins her and confronts her: a furious dispute breaks out between the two. Deborah escapes the watch of her husband's men and is about to enter a police station, but before entering she reconsiders. Ciro tries to talk with his wife once again, taking her out to dinner. Deborah shows no signs of calming down, and at the end of a furious quarrel Ciro kills her on a beach and simulates a criminal execution, burning her body in a car. Meanwhile, in the hospital, Genny still hovers between life and death.
14	2	"Lacrime e Sangue"	"Blood and Tears"	Stefano Sollima	10 May 2016	4.11
A year later, Genny has survived and recovered; he is in Honduras to conclude a very important drug deal before his return to Italy. A few months later he returns to Rome to conclude the drug trade with Don Giuseppe Avitabile, a Neapolitan boss operating in the capital. Before leaving for Scampia, Genny stays one night in Don Giuseppe's hotel, where the Don's daughter Azzurra seduces him. Later, Genny goes to Cologne where his fugitive father Don Pietro is in hiding, hosted by a Calabrian clan. Genny delivers a load of diamonds for the purchase of weapons and drugs to the head of the Calabrian clan. Father and son disagree on how to handle business and how to get back in control of Scampia and Secondigliano. Genny and his father, invited by the Calabrian clan leader to a dinner, are almost caught in an ambush by another Calabrian clan, but manage to escape death. During their escape, they are seen and chased by the police on foot, but Don Pietro collapses and is forced to stop. Genny steals a car at a service station, murders the owner, and collects his father. They take refuge in an old factory overnight. In the morning Don Pietro wakes up, and calls his men to be taken elsewhere but without saying anything to his son. Genny catches him just before he departs, wanting an explanation. Pietro advises him to go home and be quiet.
15	3	"Mea Culpa"	"My Fault"	Stefano Sollima	17 May 2016	3.58
In Naples, a parish priest asks Salvatore Conte to close the drug spot right in front of his church, a request that is granted. The members of the clan express their discontent with Conte, while Ciro apparently supports the boss's decision. Conte secretly prepares an execution of Ciro. Unbeknownst to the clan members, Conte's girlfriend is a transsexual singer. However, he brings her sister to act as his girlfriend at his birthday dinner. During Conte's birthday dinner, 'o Mulatto insults and mocks the singer (Conte's real girlfriend) for her transsexuality. Conte publicly stabs Mulatto in the hand with a knife and then also revokes his control of his drug spot. Conte's girlfriend refuses to see him anymore. Ciro secretly supports the complaints of 'o Mulatto. The following evening, after a Virgin Mary procession, Conte plans to use 'o Mulatto and 'o Principe to kill Ciro, but they double-cross Conte, and kill him.
16	4	"Profumo di iena"	"Hyena Scent"	Francesca Comencini	17 May 2016	3.69
Chanel's daughter-in-law, Marinella, is having a secret affair with Chanel's driver, Mario Cantapane. Together, Chanel and Marinella go to a boutique to buy a dress from Patrizia, a shopgirl who is Malammore's niece and a confidante of Marinella. Since their parents were killed, Patrizia works hard to care for her siblings and keeps them away from crime. At Malammore's urging, Patrizia extracts information from Marinella, and secretly hosts Pietro Savastano, who is hiding in a hidden room in a Scampia apartment. Pietro's plan is to cause problems and attacks on Alliance bosses to unleash a new Camorra war while Malammore is responsible for enforcing his field orders. Informed of the death of Conte, Pietro Savastano organizes a robbery, first to a simple courier, then against Chanel. The material perpetrator of the theft, Angelo Sepino, is discovered and beaten; the intervention of Ciro and 'o Principe saves him from death, and he reveals the name of his principal: Pietro Savastano. Meanwhile Genny, who moved to Rome to live with his partner, Azzurra, schemes to rise to power in Naples.
17	5	"Occhi negli occhi"	"Eye to Eye"	Claudio Cupellini	24 May 2016	3.73
Patrizia becomes Don Pietro's confidant. Ciro meets Genny asking Don Aniello to act as a guarantor by contacting Azzurra's father. Meanwhile Genny, during his birthday party, finds some of his young men, 'o Track, Capa 'e Bomba 'o Cardillo, the only survivors of Conte's ambush, who suggest eliminating Ciro, but Genny refuses. Don Pietro also wants Genny to kill Ciro. Ciro and Genny travel separately to Trieste, ahead of the meeting scheduled for the following day. Genny manages to enter Ciro's hotel room, surprising him from behind in a moment of distraction. Genny forces him to kneel with a gun pointed at his head and beg forgiveness, but he does not shoot and tells him to remember this moment. The following day, the two go to the appointment together with the guarantor Don Aniello. Ciro proposes to Genny to limit himself to being a capocamorra like all the others together with his father, and Genny accepts. Back in Rome, Genny is informed that Azzurra is pregnant. Ciro returns home to be with his daughter. Informed of the agreement between Genny and Ciro, Don Pietro is furious.
18	6	"'O Track"	"'O Track"	Claudio Cupellini	24 May 2016	3.99
Patrizia and Don Pietro meet Genny in Rome. Genny reveals that he wants to avoid a new war and the pact with Ciro; Don Pietro accepts the conditions. Ciro explains the terms of the agreement reached with Gennaro and his men to his faithfuls: the Alliance will acquire drugs only from Genny and Don Pietro and what remains of the Savastano clan will be confined in the ward assigned to them. The young followers of Genny, the Alley Boys led by 'o Track, oppose the agreement and rob a betting house without asking permission. Malammore is sent to suppress the revolt and puts in a beating, ordering him to respect the established pacts. The Alley Boys react by killing one of Malammore's men, and he in turn responds by ambushing o' Track, but fails to kill him. Ciro proposes to the Alley Boys, by now unarmed and disorganised, to cross over to his side. With a coup in Malammore's district, the boys steal weapons and unilaterally nominate themselves masters of the squares in front of the Savastano clan. Genny arranges a secret agreement with the o' Principe, granting him more drugs than the predetermined to strengthen him with a promise to help Genny get into power. Genny is upset about the Alley Boy initiatives; he organizes a meeting with the guarantee of 'o Cardillo, but 'o Track kills the men of Genny, announcing his mutiny towards the Savastanos and to maintain full possession of the square of Malammore. Genny accepts and returns to Rome to prepare for his upcoming trip to Honduras. Patrizia informs Don Pietro, now deeply disappointed by Genny and his "weakness" against the Alley Boys, delegitimising the figure of his son and declaring war on the Alliance.
19	7	"Il Principe e il Nano"	"The Prince and the Dwarf"	Claudio Giovannesi	31 May 2016	4.12
'O Principe continues to receive exclusively superior quality drugs from Genny at an advantageous price, as per their previous secret agreement. 'O Nano, a close friend of Ciro, shows distrust of 'o Principe, suspected of profiting off the Alliance due to the particularly high earnings of his square, despite being the man who brings more money to the Alliance. 'O Principe in fact leads a particularly luxurious lifestyle and does not hide his wealth; he buys luxury cars, a panther, and buys a nail salon business for his girlfriend Azmera. Meanwhile, Patrizia no longer wants to host Don Pietro. Don Pietro sends Malammore to threaten and convince Patrizia to resume her role. For the safety of her family, Patrizia decides to go back to Don Pietro. In the meantime, Don Pietro is organizing the execution of the 'o Principe, using once again the young Angelino Sepino. The Alliance finds itself with the arrival of a new drug shipment. 'O Nano confides in 'o Track his suspicions, namely that he thinks 'o Principe secretly buys the drugs from Genny, cutting it even more. The storefront of the nail salon owned by Azmera is shot up, and all suspicions are placed on 'o Nano. 'O Nano is excluded from the Alliance and is beaten and deprived of his own square. 'O Nano presents himself before all the members of the Alliance and swears that he was not responsible for the shooting at the store, publicly apologizing to 'o Principe, and thus being reinstated into the Alliance. Back in his square, 'o Nano brutally kills Manolo, to whom the Alliance had given control of the square. Meanwhile, Azmera disappears. 'O Principe, in despair, takes his assigned driver Angelino to where the panther is kept to feed it. Once stopped at the gates, Don Pietro and his men arrive, who had been informed about the movements of 'o Principe by Angelino. 'O Principe reveals to the boss that he is a man close to his son Genny, key to his operation, but Don Pietro shoots him in the head anyway, interested only in his personal advantage.
20	8	"Divide et Impera"	"Divide and Conquer"	Claudio Giovannesi	31 May 2016	3.60
Patrizia tells Don Pietro that chaos erupts within the Alliance. The members of the Alliance are in fact convinced that 'o Nano is the instigator of the killing of 'o Principe, given the disagreements previously had. The only one who tries to calm the members is Ciro, at least until there is evidence. Ciro suspects Don Pietro's intervention to destabilise the fragile balance of the clan. Ciro first speaks with Azmera to learn more details, who tells him of Angelino Sepino, that it was him who had bought 'o Principe to feed the panther. Ciro tells 'o Nano that if he is truly innocent, he must prove it in the eyes of others, and advises him to go away for a while. Fearing for his life, 'o Nano listens to Ciro's advice and prepares for departure. He greets his cronies and leaves with his wife and daughter for the Lazio coast, not too convinced that Ciro actually believes in his innocence. However, as soon as he arrives at his destination he is reached and killed on the beach in front of his daughter with his wife watching. The Alliance learns of what happened and the suspects initially fall on 'o Mulatto, a friend of 'o Principe. Ciro goes to 'o Nano's widow to get a clearer picture of the situation, but she was not able to identify the killer. Ciro decides to captured Angelino Sepino in his home; he is taken to a cemetery to be interrogated. Ciro shows no mercy to the boy's requests for forgiveness, which he says was threatened and forced. Ciro is to bury him alive and kill his girlfriend, unless he reveals the instigator of the 'o Principe murder; the boy confesses that it was Don Pietro. Ciro decides to spare Sepino's life, provided he leaves Naples and never returns. After the funeral of 'o Nano, Ciro, increasingly obsessed with the memory of his wife, takes his daughter for a walk on the beach and confesses that he brought her there because her mother died there.
21	9	"Sette Anni"	"Seven Years"	Francesca Comencini	7 June 2016	3.15
Scianel proposes to Ciro that her son Lelluccio, who is about to be released from prison, be a substitute for the piazza of Spaccio. In public, Ciro announces the assignment of the market place to Lelluccio: the Alley Boys are extremely opposed. Scianel suspects Marinella of cheating and, following her, discovers the extramarital affair with Mario, her driver. Mario is killed, Marinella beaten, but Lelluccio is left to decide the fate of the girl. Lelluccio is released from prison, and after a fight with Marinella, he leaves the house furious. The Alley Boys follow him on the street to take him elsewhere to kill him. Travelling by car, they are stopped at a police checkpoint that allows Lelluccio to save himself. Scianel captures 'o Track, torturing and killing him. She then goes to Ciro and asks him to intervene against the Alley Boys, but Ciro remains neutral in the clash between the two factions. Lelluccio orders that Marinella not be touched. Marinella is convinced that he will kill her and decides to accept the help of Patrizia, who provides her with the telephone number of Bomber (Capa 'e Bomba) to set a trap for her husband. They agree with the Alley Boys to kill Lelluccio to avenge their friend 'o Track's death. The Alley Boys send inexperienced hit men and they make a mistake and kill an innocent person instead. Marinella, now discovered, flees and decides to go to the police station and collaborate in order to have the protection of the authorities, denouncing Scianel for the murder of her lover Mario Cantapane. Ciro reaches Genny at the airport on his return from Honduras. Genny is informed of the situation and of the deaths of 'o Principe and 'o Nano, and of the imminent mafia war. Ciro asks Genny to side with him against his father, who sees him as just a kid, a shadow of his father.
22	10	"Fantasmi"	"Ghosts"	Francesca Comencini	7 June 2016	3.10
Scianel summons Don Pietro, feeling betrayed by the Alliance. Ciro, thanks to telephone interceptions, discovers the role of Patrizia in the Savastano clan, and orders his men to follow her. Genny organizes a meeting with his father; Patrizia serves as a liaison. She realizes she is being followed and deliberately drives to a remote place, warning Genny and Pietro before she is captured by Ciro. Ciro forces her to reveal the location of Don Pietro's hideout by threatening to kill her brother, but thanks to her warning, Don Pietro has already fled and escapes execution. Ciro spares the lives of Patrizia and her brother. Don Pietro and Genny, safe in another location, remain hostile in their positions. Malammore sells the square of Scianel to the Alley Boys in exchange for the life of Ciro; Scianel manages to escape but is stopped by the police and arrested. Her son Lelluccio, having escaped the ambush, renews his loyalty to Ciro.
23	11	"Nella gioia e nel dolore"	"In Joy and in Sorrow"	Claudio Cupellini	14 June 2016	4.91
The Savastanos once again hit the Alliance by killing 'o Mulatto by one of his own henchmen who "escorted" him from the barber following the betrayal of the Alley Boys. Patrizia is accused by her siblings of having condemned them to the world of organized crime, so she vents with Don Pietro. 'o Zingariello convinces his men to return to the Savastano side, considering them more powerful. Don Pietro accepts but demands the death of Ciro. 'o Zingariello invites Ciro to meet him in the garage. In Rome, Alfredo accidentally kills a public official who should only have been frightened. His brother gives him a plane ticket to Venezuela, promising their boss Don Giuseppe that due to Alfredo's departure there will not be any further repercussions. Ciro discovers 'o Zingariello trap and escapes unharmed. Don Pietro then kills 'o Zingariello for not killing Ciro as he had agreed. Genny and Azzurra marry in the Santi Pietro e Paolo a Via Ostiense in Rome. Just as they say their vows, Alfredo is stopped by the police during his attempted escape. While the wedding celebrations are still in progress, Don Giuseppe is arrested as the alleged instigator of the murder of the public official. Don Pietro attempts to convince Patrizia to stay and live with him, saying that he still needs her. After she has moved her things to Don Pietro's house, he starts to caress her. After the reception, Genny discovers his father's wedding present: a family picture with him as a child, Don Pietro and Imma Savastano. Genny pierces the canvas, punching it in the part where he himself is portrayed.
24	12	"La fine del giorno"	"The End of the Day"	Claudio Cupellini	14 June 2016	4.79
Lelluccio is killed on the orders of Don Pietro. Ciro gathers all the enemies of the Savastanos, and strengthens the security of his daughter, Maria Rita. Genny visits Don Giuseppe in prison, who tells him he knows he has been betrayed by Genny or by his daughter Azzurra. Genny confesses to Azzurra that he had her father arrested so he would be at the top of Rome. Although Azzurra is angered, she proclaims her love for Genny and for the child she is carrying over her own blood. Don Pietro organizes a plan with Malammore to destroy Ciro. As the car that is carrying her is intercepted, Malammore shoots and kills Maria Rita. Genny is outraged by the murder and confronts Don Pietro, who claims it was to avenge his wife, Imma Donna. The two argue further over the payments and the proceeds from the sale of drugs on the Secondigliano market, but Pietro rejects Genny's request and urges him to leave Rome and return to his side in Naples. Ciro is destroyed by grief. Losing all ambition, he gives his loyalists his money and is about to leave Naples. Don Pietro decides to have one further meeting with Genny, at the cemetery in front of Imma's grave. However, Genny first goes to find Ciro, now depressed and devastated, and hands him a gun. Don Pietro reaches the chapel where his wife Imma is entombed, and leaves his escorts behind. Meanwhile, Genny arrives at the hospital where Azzurra is about to give birth. Don Pietro is alone in the family chapel but finds himself face to face with Ciro, armed and furious. Ciro shoots him in the head, just as Genny's son is born. After Ciro leaves, Malammore finds the body of Don Pietro. Genny names his newborn Pietro, after his father.

=== Season 3 (2017) ===
No. overall	No. in season	Title	English title translation	Directed by	Original release date	Italian viewers (millions)
25	1	"Viva il Re!"	"Long Live the King!"	Claudio Cupellini	17 November 2017	4.13
After the murder of Don Pietro, Malammore and his men begin the search for Ciro, whom they believe is the murderer. They track down Fernando who confesses that he is to meet with Ciro to give him a passport. Genny plays the part of dutiful son, as Don Pietro's funeral process brings out the community. He tells Patritzia that she is welcome to stay in Don Pietro's home, but she declines. Genny goes to Naples and pretends to swear revenge against Ciro when Malammore tells him that Don Pietro was killed. Genny, Malammore and his right hand man 'a Lince, go to Ciro's hiding place, but this turns out to be a trap set by Genny, and Malammore and 'a Lince are killed by Ciro. Ciro heads to the airport to leave Italy. Genny has a meeting with the boss of the Camorra bosses for the Naples city centre, Don Aniello, 'o Sciarmant, 'o Stregone, 'o Crezi and 'o Diplomato, to decide how to deal with the management of power in Scampia and Secondigliano due to the sudden absence of Don Pietro. Genny returns to Rome, where he confesses to Azzurra the betrayal perpetrated against his father in order to protect his new family.
26	2	"Hasta la muerte"	"To Death"	Claudio Cupellini	17 November 2017	3.82
One year later, we see Genny with Gegè, his hand-picked accountant from Naples. They are going over business matters when Genny tells Gegè to withdraw all available money. Genny then asks Gegè to accompany him when he goes to the airport to pick up Joaquin, a Honduran drug traffiker. They go to a meeting, where Gegè then gets dragged into participating in the cleanup of two dead bodies that Genny and Joaquin murder and dump. Meanwhile, in Secondigliano, an imprisoned Chanel asks Patrizia (through her emissary Domenico) to find Marinella and convince her not to testify against her at the trial. Patrizia travels to Latina where Marinella works in a beauty center under the false name of Irene. Marinella accepts the offer of money in exchange for lying at Chanel's trial. Don Giuseppe Avitabile, Genny's father-in-law, leaves the prison to undergo house arrest. Genny and Gegè report that in his absence the capital and earnings have increased. Don Avitabile, however, does not trust them, and first threatens Gegè's boyfriend, then Gegè himself, who confirms his suspicions. Meanwhile, Genny waits for a shipment of cocaine to arrive to the port.
27	3	"Inferno"	"Hell"	Claudio Cupellini	24 November 2017	3.45
For the past year, Ciro has been living in Sofia, Bulgaria, working for criminal boss Valentin, driving trucks that transport drugs and illegal immigrants. Mladen, Valentin's son, doesn't like Ciro and sends him to evict tenants from a public housing complex so the apartments can be used for human traffiking. Soon, we see that Mladen takes one of the traffiked girls for himself, and he degrades her in front of Ciro. Even though Ciro tells Mladen that not interacting with Neapolitans is part of "his deal," Ciro is ordered to negotiate with Neapolitan Camorra members who have come to Mladen's discotheque. Ciro meets Enzo "Sangueblù," leader of the Camorra clan and discovers the money they pay him with is counterfeit. Ciro quickly recognizes that this is a trap set by Mladen to turn Valentin against him. Ciro keeps the heroin and sends Enzo back to Naples. Later, he meets with Valentin, tells him what happened, and when Valentin doesn't respond to Ciro's liking, he kills him. Next Ciro goes to Mladen's apartment, kills him, and rescues the Albanian girl. On the way out, he grabs one of the girls' passports so she can cross the border with him, where he gives her money and a phone and sets her free. Ciro then leaves Bulgaria, returning to Naples.
28	4	"Il filo e la Moira"	"The Thread and the Moira"	Francesca Comencini	24 November 2017	3.72
At Chanel's trial, Marinella is called to confirm her original testimony about Mario's murder; however, per her agreement with Patrizia, Marinella lies, and Chanel is freed. Gennaro learns from Patrizia that Chanel wants independence, but Genny tells her that she should stay with the Savastano clan and control her previous square. Ciro, now in Naples, finds Sangueblù and sells him the heroin he took from the Bulgarians. Sangueblù talks about the importance of friends and asks Ciro to join him and his clan. When the Esperenza arrives at the port, Avitabile and his men board, but find neither the shipment of drugs or Genny. Genny, having been suspicious of Gegè, proceeded to personally collect the shipment at high sea. Genny then goes to Gegè's house, tells him that he has discovered his betrayal, and beats him to death. Together with 'e Bomba and o' Cardillo, Genny goes to exchange the drugs with his Calabrian connection, but is ambushed by Avitabile and his men, who kill 'e Bomba and o' Cardillo, kidnap Genny, then brutally beat him. Don Avitabile tells a beaten Genny that he has killed his Honduran source, taken away all his allies, and that he has anonymously reported his companies to the tax department, freezing his funds. He also threatens to kill him if he tries to see his wife and son again. Genny is transported back to Secondigliano and dumped out into the road. Ciro's phone rings.
29	5	"Sangue Blu"	"Blue Blood"	Francesca Comencini	1 December 2017	3.58
Genny goes to see Ciro; both are infuriated at their loss of power and having been run out of Naples. Ciro tells Genny that as long as Genny's first priority is getting his family back, and not revenge, he will team up with him. Sangueblù's gang hijacks a trailer carrying power drills and turns a small profit re-selling the goods. When Ciro visits Sangueblù, Enzo shows him his marijuana plantation, hoping to impress him. Instead, Ciro explains that Enzo will never grow his power with small time jobs and marijuana; Enzo needs to listen to him, and do what he says to be successful. Ciro goes back to his old playbook, and with Sangueblù's gang, pulls off a heist to fund their next enterprise. When the gang considers spending the money, Ciro advises Sangueblù to invest it instead in order to grow his business. As the gang watches, Sangueblù hands over the money to Ciro, who has now become his mentor. Ciro gives the money to Genny, telling him that they can now begin rebuilding. Using one of his father's old connections, Genny buys cocaine, which Sangueblù and the gang prepare for sale. That evening, Enzo meets his contact Valerio, who helps with the distribution of their cocaine in the local bar scene. Enzo is excited by their quick success, but Ciro warns that trouble will come once word gets out that they are dealing cocaine. Enzo, who had given some of the money to his sister, Carmela, for her failing restaurant in Forcella, returns to her home to pick up a stash. Carmela confronts him about his move from small-time dealer to selling cocaine, warning Enzo that she made a promise to their mother that they would not become involved in the System. Enzo replies that it was not his promise, and he doesn't intend to keep it.
30	6	"Come nascere"	"Like Being Born"	Francesca Comencini	1 December 2017	3.37
After Genny and Ciro buy more drugs, Genny meets with Michele Casillo, the mayor of Giugliano he helped win the election, who tells him that he will ensure he gets votes in the next election in return for granting Genny's companies various public contracts. Patrizia continues to act as an intermediary between Genny and Scianel, telling her that Genny has a new proposal for her, but she refuses knowing that Genny has been pushed aside by Avitabile. Later, Sangueblù kills an employee of one of Genny's business associates who steps out of line. With the promise of squares, Scianel agrees to meet with Genny; Genny presents his new allies to Scianel: Sangueblù, his men, and Ciro.
31	7	"Sangue del mio sangue"	"Blood of My Blood"	Claudio Cupellini	8 December 2017	3.40
Sangueblù, his men and Ciro go to the home of Valerio to conclude the deal. At the warehouse where they package the drugs, police are approaching; Valerio drives his sports car away from the warehouse, past the police, who pursue him instead of the warehouse, allowing the others to escape. Valerio is eventually stopped and arrested, but released soon after. Packages of drugs are delivered to Valerio's high-end clients by posing as mailmen. They move their drug processing lair to an apartment, and 'o Sciarmante, one of the rival Confederates, watches them. 'o Sciarmante meets with the other Confederates, and 'o Crezi and 'o Diplomato want to kill Sangueblù. However, the leader 'o Stregone tells them that someone must be guiding Sangueblù. Meanwhile, Genny secretly meets Azzurra at a movie theatre and tells her that he is working to get her and Pietro back. 'O Sciarmante meets with Sangueblù where he offers him his own square, something his father never had. In return, Sangueblù must buy the drugs from the Confederates and reveal who is behind his operation. Sangueblù refuses the offer and goes to tell Ciro that he remained loyal. Ciro meets with Genny to inform him that Sangueblù has decided to be on their side.
32	8	"Guerra aperta"	"Open War"	Claudio Cupellini	8 December 2017	3.51
In the middle of the night, a bomb explodes Carmela's restaurant. Sangueblù tells his men that the crew must have only one captain, to the dismay of some of them, so that they can beat the Confederates. Sangueblù goes to Patrizia to receive instructions from Genny; he is given a piece of paper with a name, Catenella, who knows the location of the Confederates weapons. Patrizia then goes to Secondigliano, to Genny, who sends her to Scianel to inform her of the war now started against the Confederates. Genny wants to know once and for all if Scianel is on his side, and Patrizia finally obtains her consent. Sangueblù and Valerio lure Catenella into a trap, and force him to reveal the location of the weapons belonging to the Confederates; immediately afterwards, Sangueblù shoots him dead. Genny later tells Sangueblù and his men that Forcella will be theirs. Sangueblù's men rob a bar in Forcella in the area of 'o Crezi. 'O Crezi plans to respond with fire, and he sends several men to pick up their weapons, but Sangueblù and his men, knowing the locations of the weapons, wait for them to arrive before killing them and stealing their weapons. Meanwhile, in Secondigliano, Genny asks Scianel for 30 percent of her earnings to win the war in exchange for the Capaccio area with the return of triple the amount loaned by Scianel in case of victory. 'O Diplomato is furious at the loss of his men, and his brother proposes two solutions: eliminate them or work with them.
33	9	"Giuda!"	"Judas!"	Claudio Cupellini	15 December 2017	3.75
Ciro goes to 'o Stregone to look for armistice. The old Confederate boss, once having seen the true leader behind Sangueblù, consents to the sale of Forcella to Sangueblù, with reluctance by 'o Sciarmante. Enzo declares his conquest to his men, and his sister Carmela later also congratulates him, but warns him to be careful and to keep her son Cosimo out of crime. Soon after, Carmela is shot to death while shopping. The hunt for the culprit starts immediately with Sangueblù suspecting 'o Sciarmante. Ciro first goes to 'o Stregone who says he did not give the order and will look for a potential culprit among his associates. Sangueblù and Valerio ambush 'o Sciarmante at a party, however the attempt is botched, and Sangueblù is seriously injured in one eye as they escape. Ciro meets with Genny, whom he suspects was responsible for Carmela's murder in order to turn Sangueblù against the Confederates. Having escaped the attack, 'o Sciarmante is visited by Scianel, who reveals that Genny is behind Ciro, and the two form an agreement to eliminate Genny.
34	10	"La creatura"	"The creature"	Francesca Comencini	15 December 2017	3.88
Avitabile kidnaps Pietro in front of his daughter's eyes and hands him over to the Confederates. Azzurra tells Genny about the incident by phone, and he calls Patrizia who goes to the Confederates to reach an agreement in order to return Pietro. Genny announces that Sangueblù and his men will still keep Forcella but the cocaine will be bought from the Capaccio brothers, to whom they will have to pay 40 percent of the revenue. The Confederates ask, through Patrizia, compensation from Genny of three million euros for what they have lost since he started selling his drugs in their squares. Azzurra presses her father to find out about her son's situation, telling him that she will kill him if the child does not return home. Sangueblù's men complain about the poor quality of the Capaccio's cocaine. One of them, 'o Cantonese, assumes a total loss of their market within a week, who decides, with Ronni, to sell some of their cocaine, but the Capaccios find out about it through their affiliates. Patrizia brings Genny's money to the Confederates, but for them, the compensation is not enough for the return of Pietro; the Capaccios want 'o Cantonese and Ronni killed. Genny has Sangueblù's two men executed, who fall into the water when being shot of a pier. However, when Capaccios and Genny leave, Sangueblù, Valerio, and Ciro, who are present at the execution, help the two out of the water, who were wearing bulletproof vests without the Capaccio's knowledge. And while 'o Stregone gives the green light to the return of Pietro, Patrizia and Scianel make a toast to their future conquest of Secondigliano.
35	11	"Fede"	"Faith"	Francesca Comencini	22 December 2017	4.11
Avitabile meets with the Confederates, Scianel and Patrizia. The Confederates offer him an exchange: he will return Azzurra and Pietro to Genny in exchange for Sangueblù and Ciro. Avitabile is initially against the exchange, but listening to the opinions of the Confederates, he accepts. Patrizia informs Genny of the exchange, and at the same time informs Scianel that the latter wants to meet her to propose to go into business with him, exclusively in Secondigliano. Scianel refuses as she enters that society only for her personal profit. Azzurra stays with Pietro in her old childhood home. Genny meets Ciro and Sangueblù for the impending war. Patrizia and 'o Sciarmante fetch Azzurra and Pietro. Once at the exchange site, Genny informs 'o Sciarmante of the position of Ciro and Sangueblù. 'O Sciarmante sends his men, but Sangueblù and his men surround them. Sangueblù forces one of 'o Sciarmante's men to call him and report that they have eliminated both him and Ciro. 'O Sciarmant is informed of the return of his men and makes an appointment with them in an alley in Forcella, but when he arrives, he is riddled with bullets when Sangueblù's men ambush him. Avitabile and his men go to make the exchange. He leaves his daughter and grandson free and leaves. Genny runs to embrace them but one of Avitabile's men hides with a sniper rifle, but before he can kill Genny, Patrizia, who had already seen the hiding man, shoots him dead. As Avitabile drives away, a bomb hidden in garbage cans at the side of the road, and detonated by Ciro, throws the car into the air, and Avitabile dies instantly.
36	12	"Per sempre"	"Forever"	Francesca Comencini	22 December 2017	4.53
The Confederates summon Scianel, and 'o Stregone openly denies his support for Scianel saying that the war that she wants to wage would not benefit them, and that Patrizia has gone over to their side. The Confederates kill Scianel's bodyguard, and Scianel at the hands of Patrizia. Genny, one step away from conquering Naples, is warned by Azzurra that if Genny continues she will leave him. The Confederates, Ciro, Sangueblù and Genny meet. 'O Stregone assigns Forcella to Sangueblù, but will have to share 'o Sciarmante's territory with Genny. In exchange, Genny agrees to sell the cocaine which will then be resold later in the squares at agreed prices, to avoid competition between the factions. Later, Ciro, who first goes to Deborah and Maria Rita's grave, and Genny are invited by Sangueblù to a yacht party to celebrate their victory. Meanwhile, the Capaccios go to the home of 'o Stregone and kill him by repeatedly slamming his face on a table. When Ciro and Genny arrive, Sangueblù reveals his open contempt for Genny, threatening to kill him. Ciro intervenes and decides to sacrifice himself for Genny, claiming that he is the real problem, that is, being a man who having lost everything, had come to make the most unpredictable gestures, confessing that he was Carmela's killer even though it was Genny who killed her. Sangueblù then gives Genny a gun to kill Ciro. Genny, albeit reluctant, fires a shot into the chest of Ciro, whose body is thrown overboard. As Ciro's body sinks into the sea, some air bubbles come from his mouth.

=== Season 4 (2019) ===
No. overall	No. in season	Title	English title translation	Directed by	Original release date	Italy viewers (millions)
37	1	"Episodio 1"	Episode 1	Francesca Comencini	29 March 2019	N/A
With Ciro dead, Genny struggles between the discouragement for the loss of his partner and the worry of having to defend himself from the Capaccio brothers. For this reason, together with Patrizia, Genny goes to Gerlando, his uncle (who is married to his mother Imma's cousin) and the head of the Levante family, an important clan of Villa Literno in the province of Caserta that are affiliated with the Cosa nostra. Although Gerlando had been turned away from Genny and the Savastano family at the behest of Pietro, he is willing to help. The Levantes learn, through Albanian informants, that 'o Crezi would go to a betting centre, and they give him a warning by detonating a car bomb at the centre, which wounds 'o Crezi. The Capaccios then decide to come to an agreement and to make the much-desired peace agreement with Genny and Sangueblù. From the agreement, the Capaccio and Sangueblù will retain control of the areas of central Naples such as Forcella and La Maddalena, while Secondigliano belongs to Genny, in addition to continuing to supply the drugs to all of Naples which will then be resold by everyone at the same price. Genny then announces his departure from Naples and leaves all his power in Secondigliano and the drug management to Patrizia, keeping the word he had given to Azzurra to leave the criminal life.
38	2	"Episodio 2"	Episode 2	Francesca Comencini	29 March 2019	N/A
One year later, Genny lives with his family outside Naples and has invested in a huge project involving the construction of the largest airport in Campania. Through his politician friend Michele Casillo, Genny meets Alberto Resta, an entrepreneur interested in collaborating with him on his project with the help of his trusted assistant Tiziana. With Alberto's help, Genny begins to buy the lands necessary for the construction of the future airport before presenting the contract for its construction. Alberto communicates that only one man has opposed the transfer of his land because he is aware of Genny's past, to whom he does not want to give it away. Genny offers the man €300,000, eight times the properties value, and later offers to pay for his wife's liver transplant treatment which can be done in Brazil also for €300,000. The man tells his wife, and she begs him to agree to the offer. She has no idea she was inadvertently poisoned by her husband's illegal waste burial on the family property. At first reluctant, the man then seems to convince himself to accept the proposal, but before being able to communicate it to Genny himself, he is brutally attacked and further intimidated to accept the offer. Genny visits the man, observing his wounds, and he says he changed his mind about Genny's offer due to the attack. Genny suspects Alberto and he confesses that he was tired of waiting and therefore instigated the beating. Genny then goes back to the man and informs him that, through Gerlando, that he knows his land is poisoned due to illegal dumping, and that he himself is likely the cause of his wife's cancer. Genny then offers him a lower figure than the one proposed previously and threatening to reveal everything to his wife. The man therefore accepts.
39	3	"Episodio 3"	Episode 3	Francesca Comencini	5 April 2019	N/A
A robbery takes place inside of a bordello by two boys from Secondigliano. Soon after, they are captured by the men of Patrizia because they cannot operate on the territory of Genny, entrusted to her. After a beating, the boys are given the opportunity to work in the drug market, but they are not satisfied with the small remuneration they are given. Patrizia travels to Bologna where she meets Michelangelo, engaged in the acquisition of a landfill by a local businessman in economic difficulties. In order to restore the company acquired, by cutting costs, Michelangelo begins to dispose of the waste by inserting it into the reinforced concrete destined for major works. Patrizia later has sex with Michelangelo. Meanwhile, the two boys from Secondigliano go to a nightclub, but soon run out of drugs for them and for some girls in the club. Having no money to buy more, the two decide to steal it from a dealer in Sangueblù's territory. Sangueblù and his men chase and catch them, but frees them after they say they are part of Patrizia's gang. On returning from Bologna, Patrizia is forced to kill the two boys in order to respect the alliance with Sangueblù. Later, Patrizia tries to talk to her younger brother, but is refused.
40	4	"Episodio 4"	Episode 4	Francesca Comencini	5 April 2019	N/A
Genny and Alberto travel to London to conclude the acquisition of Wimpro, an indispensable company for the realization of the airport project but which, being in liquidity crisis, is forced to sell the majority of its shares. In order to make the payment, religious statues are sent to London that are inconspicuously painted to conceal the fact that they are made of gold. The paint is washed off, and are melted and transformed into gold bars that Genny deposits in the vault of a London bank. Alberto then introduces Genny to Leena, his longtime English friend, who will help them in the deal with the help of Patrick, considered a genius of finance. Meanwhile, Azzurra also arrives in London to view the important decision, and the acquisition goes through. Soon after, however, Genny discovers, with the help of one of his collaborators who informs him that a release is missing from the purchase documentation. When Leena and Patrick do not answer their phones, Genny realizes that the acquisition was a scam designed to steal his gold. Genny tracks down Leena who, under threat, reveals to him that the gold is kept inside a warehouse of which she does not have the key. Genny and Gaetano, his collaborator in London, then go to Patrick's home but Patrick, who hears them trying to break in, escapes, but is shot dead by Gaetano as he runs down the street. Genny then retrieves the keys to the warehouse, which were on his person. Subsequently, he makes Leena, who is still a valid financial operator, believe that she can save her life if she helps them conclude the operation with another London company. The deal goes through, but after Genny, Azzurra and Alberto return to Naples, she is still killed by Gaetano who runs her over with his car.
41	5	"Episodio 5"	Episode 5	Marco D'Amore	12 April 2019	N/A
The relationship between Patrizia and Michelangelo leads the latter to introduce her to his family. However Michelangelo's father tells Patrizia, alone, that he does not want the couple to continue their relationship, so Patrizia, offended, returns to Secondigliano. In the meantime, a large shipment of drugs, which Michelangelo's family had also contributed to buy and which was destined for the whole Alliance, is confiscated in a police bust. Many of Patrizia's men are arrested with the exception of Nicola and Lino who escape. Patrizia, realizing the seriousness of the situation, convenes a meeting where she promises to the Alliance that within a month she would make another load available. However, the Capaccio brothers, whose only business is drug dealing, are not satisfied and ask to get the money back within a few days, in order to be able to reuse it for the purchase of drugs from a new channel. Crushed by the task, Patrizia turns to Genny who agrees to lend her the money. In the meantime, Michelangelo returns to Secondigliano and urges Patrizia to have courage. Patrizia, having returned the money to the Capaccio brothers, goes to Michelangelo's house and communicates to his father that they will continue their relationship.
42	6	"Episodio 6"	Episode 6	Marco D'Amore	12 April 2019	N/A
Nicola begins to investigate who is behind the theft of the drug shipment before the suspicions fall completely on him. Through an informant, he learns that a good part of the seized drug has returned to the streets, passed off by a group of African gangsters, through whom he wants to trace their supplier. He then arrives at Forcella to inform Sangueblù about the news about the seized drugs and to ask him to help him find an alleged traitor within their Alliance. Sangueblù refuses, telling Nicola that the matter does not concern him. Valerio, however, thinks differently from his friend and reminds him that they cannot go on with selling pills to teenagers. Sangueblù explains to him that he thinks that Nicola is planning to overtake command of Secondigliano in place of Patrizia. At an appointment with the African contact, Nicola and Lino are ambushed where his cousin Lino is killed with a gunshot. Behind the ambush and the theft of the drugs are the brothers Saro and Francesco Levante, who urge Nicola to kill Patrizia, who they deem unsuitable for the role of boss, and to take her place as boss of Secondigliano. If Nicola does not obey, his family will be killed and Patrizia will be made to believe that he is behind the seized drugs. In the meantime, Patrizia manages to speak with her brother outside the place where he works, informing him of her pregnancy. Michelangelo, on the other hand, learns from his sister Grazia of what has been planned by the other two brothers, and manages to stop Nicola on his way to kill Patrizia. Michelangelo takes Nicola with him to clarify everything with his brothers. Michelangelo learns from his brothers that the order to kill Patrizia came from their father. Michelangelo, unable to go against his family, kills Nicola. Michelangelo goes to inform Patrizia of the death of Nicola, who falsely tells her that he had intended to take her place in Secondigliano. Patrizia tells him that she is pregnant by him. Michelangelo then goes to his father to inform him that Patrizia is pregnant with his child. Gerlando, despite being against the relationship, gives him his blessing.
43	7	"Episodio 7"	Episode 7	Enrico Rosati	19 April 2019	N/A
Sangueblù and his men cannot wait any longer for the new drug shipment promised by Patrizia. They attempt an assault on an armoured vehicle, but the ambush goes awry when the escort for the armoured vehicle opens fire killing 'o Top Model, a new father. Valerio tries to take matters into his own hands and, in agreement with 'a Golia and 'o Cantonese, sets up a meeting in secret with the Capaccios to understand more about the seized cargo. A new load of drugs arrives in Forcella, but Sangueblù does not see Valerio and begins to have suspicions about him. Valerio, meeting with the Capaccios and suggests a new Alliance between Forcella and the Capaccios. The Capaccios agree, but are also skeptical that his proposal is only in order to take command of Forcella instead of Sangueblù. Valerio later justifies his absence in front of Enzo with the excuse that his father recently taken from a heart attack. Sangueblù does not buy the excuse and goes to Valerio's father's house, finding his health to be fine. He then summons 'a Golia and 'o Cantonese to follow Valerio like shadows. Before the meeting with the Capaccios later that night, Valerio goes to his father at the port, giving him an envelope. At the meeting, Valerio is accompanied by 'a Golia and 'o Cantonese, and they find the truth previously discovered by Nicola before he was killed—the Levante family were behind the seized drugs as they wanted to incite war in Secondigliano to eliminate the Alliance. Valerio reiterates the proposal made in the first meeting with the Capaccios, but he is killed by 'a Golia, to the amazement of those present, saying that Valerio was secretly recording them on his phone during the meeting, pretending to betray Enzo and Patrizia, but with the real purpose of reporting everything to them. 'A Golia then proposes an agreement, this time to really eliminate Sangueblù and Patrizia; with hesitance, the Levantes agree. Sangueblù is informed of Valerio's death, with 'a Golia falsely declaring that he killed Valerio because he had tried to escape. At Sangueblù's request, the body of Valerio is abandoned inside the trunk of a car outside of his father's house.
44	8	"Episodio 8"	Episode 8	Enrico Rosati	19 April 2019	N/A
When human remains are found during excavations for the construction of a multi-level parking garage, Tiziana Palumbo, Alberto's assistant, discovers that those lands were used for the illegal disposal of bodies. Assuming the corpses have been there for a long time, Alberto wants the work to continue, but Tiziana does not trust that all of the workers will keep silent, and instead proposes to alert the authorities to allow the project to be completely transparent. Alberto is later summoned by a friend, Ferdinando, who informs him of anti-money laundering investigations that have been launched against him. Ferdinando advises him to confess who is really backing the project, and that he must repay all outstanding debts, otherwise the bank will initiate bankruptcy proceedings against him. Alberto leaves without saying anything further, and later asks for help from Genny, who through the consortium of three foreign companies, will give him the amount to pay off the debt. Meanwhile, Patrizia marries Michelangelo, and it seems that the differences with Gerlando and his wife are settled. As a wedding gift, Genny tells Patrizia that she will now be in full control of Secondigliano, and everything she will gain from the square, from then on, is hers. Magistrate Walter Ruggieri summons Alberto to clarify some doubts about three foreign companies, with whom he works as a consultant, finding the income to resolve his debts with banks. Alberto denies everything by arguing otherwise, that is, that he is a creditor to those companies, soliciting their payments and then covering the debts he had with the banks. Alberto later asks Tiziana if all the payments she has dealt with since the beginning of the airport project have been successful; she says yes and then he confesses to her about his meeting with the magistrate. Although Tiziana promises to keep this between them, she reports everything to Genny, telling him that Alberto did not mention his name to Walter. Genny, however, suspects it is only a matter of time until Alberto cracks. Genny and Alberto meet on the coast for another future business to plan together. When they leave, Alberto drives away, but as he approaches a turn in the road, realizes his brakes have been cut, and dies as his car falls down a cliff.
45	9	"Episodio 9"	Episode 9	Ciro Visco	26 April 2019	N/A
Sangueblù's drugs are stolen from the squares by the Capaccio family who were tipped off by 'a Golia. Sangueblù wants to respond, but he first he goes to Secondigliano to ask Patrizia if she will support him. She denies her consent, reiterating the neutrality of her area from the affairs of central Naples. 'A Golia secretly meets with the Capaccios to decide on the strategy to overtake Forcella. Sangueblù finds out that 'o Crezi visits a massage parlour once a week, and gathers his men to ambush him there. However, the ambush fails and Enzo loses some men. Meanwhile, Genny promotes Tiziana as new CEO following Alberto's death. He then has a consultation with a doctor who will cosmetically remove the scar on his face and the tattoo on his neck. Sangueblù visits Valerio's father who gives him an envelope with the letter that his son had told him to give to Sangueblù in case something was to happen to him. While organizing his men, Sangueblù makes it known that he has to meet with one of his contacts who can get him drugs. At this meeting he would like to go alone, so as not to endanger anyone else's life, but 'a Golia volunteers to accompany him. 'A Golia notifies 'o Crezi of the meeting place. Once at the spot, Enzo seems defeated as he stands before 'o Crezi and 'a Golia who points a gun at him. However, Sangueblù, knowing Valerio was not a traitor after reading his letter, had organized a false meeting in order to make his enemies fall into a trap. Sangueblù loyalists then emerge and kill 'a Golia and capture 'o Crezi. 'O Crezi is hung by his arms, and is beaten in order to force him to reveal who is really backing his family. 'O Diplomato warns the other two turncoats of Forcella, 'o Cantonese and MMA, to find a way to bring back his brother alive. 'O Bellebuono leaves while beating 'o Crezi due to a call from his wife that she is giving birth. When 'o Bellebuono arrives at the hospital, his wife has not given birth and 'o Cantonese emerges to attempt to sway him to the Capaccio family. Before he can answer, he receives a call from Sangueblù who asks if everything is alright. 'O Bellebuono makes Sangueblù aware of the situation by telling him that his wife wanted to name their baby Valerio after her grandfather, but he said he could not name him after a traitor. Sangueblù goes back to Secondigliano to meet Patrizia with a beaten 'o Crezi who also reveals to her that her husband's family, the Levantes are behind her recent misfortunes. Sangueblù kills 'o Crezi.
46	10	"Episodio 10"	Episode 10	Ciro Visco	26 April 2019	N/A
Patrizia decides which position to take after learning about the plot against her. Michelangelo tries to convince Patrizia to give him the command of Secondigliano due to her pregnancy. Genny also learns, through Patrizia, of the Levantes' ambition and reproaches her for not having been careful enough of whom to trust. Sangueblù meets secretly with 'o Bellebuono in Forcella to ask him to gather his most loyal men in Secondigliano, where he lives hidden in a small apartment given to him by Patrizia, together with his fiancée Maria. 'O Diplomato looks for Sangueblù everywhere after he killed his brother. Patrizia later decides to give Michelangelo Secondigliano. Michelangelo later goes to a quarry to meet his father, telling him of the decision made by his wife. Meanwhile, Sangueblù meets in the night, on a roof of a building, with his most devoted men, to take the measures to be taken against the Levantes. Francesco Levante gathers his men to eliminate Sangueblù at his apartment in Secondigliano, but falls into a trap and the ambush fails, losing his men. He manages to save himself, like his brother Saro who, in a shootout, shields himself with Evelina, a young fashion entrepreneur with whom she had long ago intertwined not only business relationships, but also extramarital affairs. Gerlando is alerted by phone, and Sangueblù and Ronni cannot find him. Sangueblù and Ronni retreat. Genny meets with some of his men who belonged to his clan in the past. One is Fernando, who previously sided with Ciro Di Marzio during the split of the old clan of Don Pietro for the conquest of Secondigliano. Genny states his decision to reassume the role he once had to recover Secondigliano.
47	11	"Episodio 11"	Episode 11	Claudio Cupellini	3 May 2019	N/A
Michelangelo meets with his family at his parents' home, who suspect that he played a role in the attack, but he denies this. Patrizia scolds Sangueblù for the failed ambush against the Levantes. Sangueblù and his men go into hiding as the Levantes and 'o Diplomato look for him. Michelangelo tells Patrizia about the meeting with his family and warns her that they suspect that she had organized the ambush together with Sangueblù and that she must lie low. A shipment of drugs is scheduled for the next day, and Michelangelo urges Patrizia that he go in her place out of fear for her life, as well as their unborn child. He also proposes to flee with her to Switzerland, but Patrizia refuses, reiterating that her home is Secondigliano and that she wants to fight for her territory until her death. The night before the shipment, a squad of Levante men plant quarry explosives inside the warehouse where the shipment is to be delivered. Meanwhile, Michelangelo is called by his father, who tells him to go to Bologna for urgent business. The next day, Saro and Francesco settle on the roof of a building in front of the warehouse where they await the arrival of Patrizia to detonate the explosives. However, when a sudden raid by police foils their plan, Patrizia is arrested together with all her men. Genny is informed of the arrest by Fernando. Azzurra also learns of the raid and fears that Patrizia may collaborate with justice, putting Genny and their affairs at the airport at risk. In prison, Patrizia is summoned to an interview by magistrate Walter Ruggieri and learns that her husband was behind the raid in order to save her from being killed by Levante explosives. Ruggieri promises that, in case of deposition, he will immediately release her from prison, give her an escort and a new home where she can plan a new life with her husband and daughter. Michelangelo visits Patrizia in prison, and she harshly reprimands him; he urges her to collaborate with Ruggeri for fear of her murder even in prison. Genny is notified of Patrizia's meeting with Ruggieri, but trusts in her silence, however, Azzurra does not and wants her killed. Two prisoners are ordered by the Levante's to kill Patrizia, but when one secretly informs Patrizia, Patrizia beats her, which also causes an injury to Patrizia and is rushed to hospital.
48	12	"Episodio 12"	Episode 12	Claudio Cupellini	3 May 2019	N/A
Patrizia recovers, and decides to talk to Ruggeri. At the meeting Patrizia tells Ruggeri that she will talk, but only if she has the certainty of not returning to prison. He tells her that it will take 120 days to check if her tips are true, or if she says something which could lead to a certain sentence. Patrizia accepts and is taken to a safe place where she speaks with Ruggeri and the lawyer who has been assigned to her. Patrizia begins with admitting that she killed Scianel. Ruggeri, also looking for information on Genny, shows her a picture of him to Patrizia and asks if she knows him; she pauses. Genny meets with 'o Diplomato and Michelangelo in the company of his men. Genny needs Michelangelo's help to free Patrizia by finding where the police have taken her, and telling 'o Diplomato where Sangueblù is hiding in return. Sangueblù is met by 'o Cantonese, who, feeling guilty, has decided to warn him that 'o Diplomato now knows the location of their hideout. Sangueblù immediately races to warn the others, but it is too late as Maria and two other loyalists have already been found and murdered by 'o Diplomato. Michelangelo meets his family at his parents' house, and Saro accuses him of having Patrizia arrested in order not to see her die at their hands; Michelanglo admits to the action. As Michelangelo leaves, he makes it clear that he is on Patrizia's side. Patrizia receives the news that Mickey has decided to collaborate; as soon as her deposition is registered, they will receive their new identities and will be taken to their new residence. While driving, Gerlando, his wife and their daughter are ambushed; Genny emerges and gives the surviving daughter a message to announce her brothers of his return. Patrizia and Michelangelo are together again. Later that night, Fernando and another man break into their room and kill the policemen, freeing Michelangelo and Patrizia. Arriving at the airport, on the runway, Patrizia thanks Genny, who is waiting for them near a private aircraft that will take them away to lay low. Michelangelo is escorted onto the plane. Genny and Patrizia remain alone for a final conversation. Genny wants to know from Patrizia what she told Ruggeri, and she says that she only spoke of herself, without talking about him. Genny does not believe her, and Patrizia, almost offended, remarks that she has never betrayed him. Genny reminds Patrizia when he told her that he should not trust anyone, including himself. Michelangelo is audibly killed on the plane. Patrizia, in disbelief, immediately understands that it is her turn; Genny kills her with three shots. Led by his men, he reaches his hideout — a tiny, dingy underground room.

=== Season 5 (2021) ===
No. overall	No. in season	Title	English title translation	Directed by	Original release date	Italy viewers (millions)
49	1	"Episodio 1"	Episode 1	Marco D'Amore	19 November 2021 (Note: This episode originally premiered at the CannesSeries fest on October 13, 2021.)	N/A
Holed up in his bunker under the protection of Don Angelo ('o Maestrale), Genny gets briefed about the movements of the surviving Levantes through an inside man in the prosecutor's office. With Genny's consent, Don Angelo and his clan attempt to execute the remaining Levantes on the occasion of their parents' funeral in Rome, but the police figure out their strategy and set a trap. The funeral secretly takes place in a different cemetery, at Prima Porta, whereas the original location, the Verano, is presided over by policemen who unsuccessfully ambush Don Angelo's men. Don Aniello and his nephew, 'o Diplomato, reach out to Genny through 'o Maestrale to ask him to join forces against the Levante family. When Genny's car apparently arrives at the prearranged location for the meeting, however, Saro Levante hits it with a rocket launcher. It later turns out Genny was not on board and a counter-trap had been prepared. Almost all of Elia Capaccio's and Levante's men are murdered (except for Saro and Francesco Levante), whereas 'o Diplomato is taken hostage to get into Don Aniello's house, only to be killed before the latter's eyes. In a plea for his own life, Don Aniello offers Genny a shocking piece of information, telling him Ciro Di Marzio is alive in Riga, Latvia. Genny then proceeds to murder him with his bare hands.
50	2	"Episodio 2"	Episode 2	Marco D'Amore	19 November 2021	N/A
Genny travels to Riga to find Ciro. The scene picks up from where The Immortal leaves off, with Genny arriving, and he and Ciro walking towards each other. Ciro tells Genny that not saying anything about his rescue was the condition set by Don Aniello to leave Genny. Genny invites him to return to Naples to recover everything with him, but Ciro declines the offer, saying everything he loved there is gone. With the death of Don Aniello, the drug trafficking with Russia now lacks a contact person. Genny offers to replace him, however showing a certain resentment for the pain he was forced to feel, convinced he had killed a brother. The two, in separate cars, go to meet the Russian trafficker and make an agreement with him. Genny is taciturn, then, when he and Ciro are alone, he shows discomfort again. As they leave the meeting place, Ciro and two of his collaborators are ambushed: the latter die and Ciro is kidnapped. The ambush had been agreed upon by Genny himself and the Russian trafficker, who decided to do business directly with each other, and to keep Ciro sequestered in a gulag. Genny goes to talk to Ciro there where he reveals all his resentment accusing him of leaving him alone, when he most needed him. Ciro tells him that he is still the scared little boy that even his father did not respect. After days in the gulag, Ciro has the idea to try to hang himself, knowing the guards will remove him from the cell. One of the guards leaves to tell his boss of the event, while the other is strangled by Ciro. Ciro escapes by row boat on a river, and finds refuge in the home of elderly Latvian nomads. When the Russian boss finds him, Ciro manages to kill him and his collaborators. Ciro starts his journey back to Naples.
51	3	"Episodio 3"	Episode 3	Marco D'Amore	26 November 2021	N/A
Magistrate Ruggieri continues his investigations into Genny, carries out an inspection of the cemetery aedicule of the Savastano family and finds the body of Don Pietro, placed inside the tomb in the name of Donna Imma. The drug dealing squares of Secondigliano are unhappy with the treatment reserved for them by the Levante family. More and more arrests take place in places where drugs are sold. At a meeting of the square leaders, Federico Maccauro, known as 'o Munaciello (Little Monk), who however does not have his own square but aspires to acquire it, invites the other zone leaders to stay with the Levantes, in the absence of valid alternatives. Together with his brother Cosimo, known as Canzuncella, he went in person to report on the situation to the Levantes. Genny is tired of hiding and is in a hurry to get Secondigliano back, and to do this, he has to convince the ringleaders to come with him, promising them a new shipment of the best quality drugs. Due to lack of time, he tries to get hold of it by attempting to take possession of the Levantes' shipment. Through the Croatian broker Igor, he manages to inquire about the recipient of the incoming shipment: it is Don Vincenzo Carignano, 'o Galantommo (the Gentleman), an elderly, old-fashioned boss, whose word is always sacred and inviolable. Genny fails to convince him to give him the shipment, even though he offers to pay him double what the Levantes promised. Meanwhile 'o Munaciello receives the wages to be distributed to the families of the prisoners, and becomes part of the Levante family thanks to the engagement arranged with Grazia at the behest of her brothers. Federico gladly accepts, even though he is aware of the girl's opposition. Azzurra, having gone to Ruggeri's public prosecutor's office with the family lawyer, clears her husband of Patrizia's accusations regarding the murder of Don Pietro: she demonstrates through the documents of the doctor and the midwife how on the same day of the murder of Don Pietro Savastano, Genny was by her side, while she gave birth to the other Pietro Savastano, their son. At the Campania fruit and vegetable market, Genny manages to take possession of the Levantes' shipment in the middle of the night, stealing it from 'o Galantommo's men. Ciro Di Marzio, on the other hand, arrives in Secondigliano.
52	4	"Episodio 4"	Episode 4	Marco D'Amore	26 November 2021	N/A
Once in Secondigliano, Ciro meets the very faithful 'o Pitbull, who has just served a period of detention in the district jail, for unknown reasons. He then sends him to Forcella to fetch Sangueblù. Enzo has been living in a basement for some time, and his lifelong friends, 'o Bellebuono and Ronni, visit him from time to time and update him on the new ferocious war going on between Genny and the Levantes. Dull in the soul and without motivation, when he finally sees his friend and mentor Ciro Di Marzio still alive, he finds new lifeblood. With the load available, Genny wins the trust of the square bosses, but 'o Munaciello insists on staying with the Levantes. Instead, her brothers go to 'o Galantommo, to discuss what happened with the theft of the shipment. Saro suspects that the old boss sold it to Genny, but Don Vincenzo denies it and to make up for it he agrees to ally with the Levantes in the war against Genny. After the Levantes leave, his wife Nunzia suggests he surrender to Genny, but is determined to continue due to the name and history that had always distinguished him. Genny prepares the definitive attack on the Levantes and does so by managing to convince 'o Munaciello to go with him by threatening to kill his brother Cosimo, who is cornered in a kennel. During a dinner with the Levante family, the engagement of Federico to Grazia is made official. With the excuse of smoking a cigarette, Federico leaves with her, saving her from the massacre which is shortly carried out by 'o Maestrale, Raffaele and 'o Jaccio. Grazia soon after obtains the same fate as her brothers, killed by 'o Munaciello after having openly declared her contempt for him. Genny takes Secondigliano back, reorganizes the drug dealing squares by assigning the area of the deceased Uocchiebell' to 'o Munaciello, and even settles the score with 'o Galantommo by having him killed on the street by 'o Maestrale. Sangueblù summons 'o Bellebuono and Ronni to Ciro's hiding place to see him again. The two, albeit incredulous, are happy to embrace him again and together with Enzo openly express their support in the definitive war to be launched against Genny. On the same night in which Genny holds a business meeting with entrepreneurs looking for capital, to restart the consortium in view of the construction of the airport. Nunzia prepares her deceased husband in view of the funeral and decides revenge by inquiring about the family of the young boss of Secondigliano. Ciro Di Marzio declares war on Genny by killing Raffaele, the square foreman of Scampia, 'o King and two of his men who are in charge of taking the drug shipments to be distributed in the squares. Genny learns the news of his return through an enormous inscription "l'Immortale è turnat" ("The Immortal has returned) which appeared on the wall near his new home with the hanging bodies of Raffaele and 'o King underneath.
53	5	"Episodio 5"	Episode 5	Marco D'Amore	3 December 2021	N/A
The war has begun. Sangueblù goes together with 'o Bellebuono and Ronni to enlarge their army. Genny militarizes the squares by doubling the men in each area and sends Fernando, a former loyalist of Ciro during the split of the old Savastano clan, as an infiltrator within the Immortal's group. However, the latter no longer trusts him, given the recent past with Gennaro and wants proof of his loyalty. Nunzia continues to inquire about the family of the boss of Secondigliano and sends Carmelo to inspect the villa where she resides in view of an imminent attack. Azzurra wants to escape from Naples, and offers money to Giovanni, one of the bodyguards defending her villa, to get some false passports useful for expatriation for her and little Pietro. She then obliges Tiziana to give her a hand if she does not want her name and all the work done so far around the consortium to end up in the investigations of the prosecutor. She entrusts her with the delicate task of selling jewels. Fernando earns Ciro's trust by indicating the place where Franco, one of Genny's outposts, usually visits in order to be able to steal the profits from his drug dealing areas. In front of a betting shop, 'o Bellebuono and Ronni shoot him as soon as he leaves the club, then steal a bag with half a million euros inside. Genny is always updated on Fernando's moves and manages through these to find the Immortal's hiding place located in an abandoned warehouse in Vigliena. The boss continues to send Fernando to the scene and advises him once inside to send a message by phone in order to start the ambush and end the war. Azzurra first receives the fake passports from Giovanni, then Tiziana in her villa to pocket the earnings of over one million euros for the jewels sold. Nunzia's men break in to be able to kill her, but she manages to escape by shielding herself with Tiziana, who dies. Giovanni wards off some attackers as she escapes but he too dies at the hands of Carmelo. Azzurra and little Pietro are forced to take refuge in Genny's house. The boss and 'o Maestrale receive Fernando's message via telephone and head with their men to the place indicated by him for the final ambush on Ciro. They find the shelter empty with Fernando already dead in a chair and his phone ringing inside his jacket. Genny answers and the Immortal makes fun of him during the call. Back home he finds his wife still shocked by the attack suffered by her and their son.
54	6	"Episodio 6"	Episode 6	Claudio Cupellini	3 December 2021	N/A
Genny responds to the attack suffered by his wife by going with 'o Maestrale and 'o Jaccio to the Carignano family cemetery aedicule. Inside it he first has the coffins of Nunzia's son and husband removed, to then demolish them and throw their corpses in front of the aedicule. Ciro, Enzo and their companions flee to Forcella. Genny sends the Maccauro brothers to the city center with a bag full of money to receive information about them and their possible collaboration from the locals to be able to eliminate them. MMA, a former lieutenant of Sangueblù, among the first in the past to betray his group together with the deceased 'a Golia, is willing to help them, not for money, but for a shipment of drugs. 'O Cantonese on the other hand, albeit still together with MMA, helps Ciro and his allies by keeping them informed of the situation in Forcella since their arrival, and helping them, at the right moment, to escape. The Maccauros receive false information about their enemies' refuge and go there with some men, finding it empty. At the same instant Sangueblù offers himself in place of Ciro to speak to Nunzia in view of a possible alliance with her. He goes to the woman locked up during the journey inside the trunk of a car with 'o Cantonese driving her. Some time later, Cosimo and Federico manage to get the right tip on the hiding place of their enemies and send MMA and some men to assassinate them. Ciro and the others are alerted in time by 'o Cantonese and manage to escape. They make their way through gunshots to be able to reach the car designated to lead them out of Forcella. MMA dies in the shooting, killed by Ciro, and 'o Cantonese loses his life while covering the backs of his allies to help them escape. The Maccauros arrive late on the spot and Cosimo is wounded in the shoulder by a bullet fired by Ronni. Ciro joins Nunzia and gets her support. Azzurra deepens her knowledge of Luciana and confesses her worries about the work and the war that her husband is waging, according to which he has acquired too many enemies over the years. Genny and 'o Maestrale go to the place indicated by Igor, their broker, for their shipment, but find the depot empty. Sangueblù's men stole his load under the direction of him and Ciro, after having kidnapped the broker, then tied him to a chair to get all the information about him. Once the objective has been obtained, Nunzia gives the entire load to the Immortal, and has Igor killed. Ciro can thus arm his army due to the proceeds he will obtain from the shipment.
55	7	"Episodio 7"	Episode 7	Claudio Cupellini	10 December 2021	N/A
Genny loses another load to his opponents and quickly gets one from a Slovenian broker to replenish his squares quickly. Ciro begins to supply his areas and start dealing with the loads stolen from Gennaro. Then at Nunzia's house she receives the unexpected visit of Luciana, who senses in Genny the smell of defeat in the ongoing war and decides to negotiate an agreement with them without the knowledge of the latter and her husband. She informs them of the latest moves of the Secondigliano boss, of the loan received from the entrepreneur for the new load, and for a large financial compensation she is willing to tell them her name too. The proposal is attractive to Ciro and Enzo, but they want all the names of the entrepreneurs with whom Genny collaborates. Azzurra is increasingly exasperated by the life she is leading because of her husband's war and Luciana manages to convince her, apparently, to side with her by making her reveal the names of all the entrepreneurs who are financing Genny. Sangueblù goes to the underground to exchange information with Luciana: the list of names for a total of one million euros. Once the deal is concluded, he returns to his car and first finds Ronni dead, having had his throat cut by a knife, then he is kidnapped in a van with the Maccauro brothers inside. Thanks to his wife, Genny discovers Luciana's attempted deception to his detriment. Finally face to face with Sangueblù, tied to a chair, he gets his revenge, after the forced murder that the former boss of Forcella imposed on him that night on the boat, marking the apparent death of Ciro Di Marzio. He tortures him with kicks, punches and blows with an iron bar. Sangueblù, dying, is thrown from a moving van in front of the Immortal's headquarters, who is informed of the accident just after a business dinner with Nunzia. Once Ciro arrives at the scene, after a farewell, he suffocates his friend with his hand to alleviate his suffering. The following day, Gennaro informs 'o Maestrale of the double-dealing orchestrated by his wife, forcing him to kill her. He then continues to receive income from his business partners. Ciro sheds bitter tears for the loss of his friend and pupil Sangueblù. On the night of his commemoration, he stipulates a blood pact with all of his men, including Donna Nunzia, the most faithful o' Pitbull and 'o Bellebuono, by now the only survivor of his old Forcella clan.
56	8	"Episodio 8"	Episode 8	Claudio Cupellini	10 December 2021	N/A
In agreement with Nunzia, they send Carmelo to turn himself in before Ruggieri regarding the attempted murder, which then failed, of Azzurra and her little Pietro. Genny informs his wife of Luciana's death, but Azzurra questions him. The boss begins not to trust 'o Maestrale and sends 'o Munaciello to follow him, with discretion. Then, once the load has arrived, he dictates the economic policy to be adopted in the squares: half-price sales to counter the competition from the areas belonging to Ciro Di Marzio. The latter's plan to bury Genny proceeds quickly. An official of the juvenile court, escorted by two policemen, takes Pietro away from his school so that he can be entrusted to a family home, whose whereabouts are unknown. Genny and Azzurra receive an unfavorable verdict from the juvenile court and cannot review it until both their parental status and a safe and suitable environment where they can raise their child are verified. The lawyer warns them of the long wait, about a year to be able to get little Pietro back, and warns Azzurra on the meeting to be held with Ruggieri due to Carmelo's deposition, as a person informed of the facts. By law, Azzurra is obliged to appear before the magistrate alone, without her lawyer. On the day of the confrontation, Azzurra refuses to collaborate with Ruggeri, and when she returns home, together with her husband, she understands the trap hatched by the Immortal behind the misadventures linked to their son. Genny promises to fix the problem and at her request, to kill Ciro Di Marzio in front of her eyes. 'O Maestrale is ordered to kidnap the little Simone Ruggeri, son of the magistrate Walter, to then be locked up inside the Maccauro home. In the meantime, they discover that Don Angelo has spared his wife, thus disobeying the execution order wanted by Genny, and is keeping her hidden in a small shelter outside Secondigliano. Genny secretly negotiates with Ruggeri for the release of their respective children: the hiding place where Simone is imprisoned for the location of the family home where Pietro resides. The Immortal starts a war in his areas in the night to avenge Sangueblù. 'o Caicco, one of his zone bosses, throws a grenade at the place where the cocaine is distributed and starts the battle with no holds barred. 'O Maestrale, present to guard the area, kills 'o Caicco, but before he pulls the trigger, 'o Caicco is proud to die for the Immortal's cause, and realizes that the battle Genny is waging against Ciro is not so much a war of power or revenge, but a real crusade, against which one is destined to lose. Thus he understands why his wife wanted to take sides on the opposite side to that of Genny.
57	9	"Episodio 9"	Episode 9	Marco D'Amore	17 December 2021	N/A
After the attack on Genny's drug dealing squares, Ciro is praised by his men. Gennaro, on the other hand, now realizing that he has lost everything, organizes himself in secret by buying a boat and false documents to escape with his family. Meanwhile, Nunzia, now tired of waiting, quarrels with Ciro asking for Genny's head. The boss of Secondigliano thinks about how to recover his son Pietro. Ruggieri follows his colleague from the juvenile court, finally discovering the location of the family home where little Pietro is kept. In the meantime, Genny meets Canzuncella and the latter tells him how the drug dealers are now abandoning their squares. 'O Munaciello meanwhile reveals to 'o Maestrale Genny's escape plan and also the truth about his wife Luciana, convincing him to betray Gennaro Savastano. 'O Maestrale goes to talk to Ciro, revealing to him the location of little Pietro's family home. Upon discovering the place, Ciro shoots 'o Maestrale in cold blood. Luciana, who was under Ciro's custody, tries in vain to escape from the house, being overtaken and killed by 'o Bellebuono. Ciro then manages to reach Azzurra due to the complicity of 'o Munaciello, revealing to Azzurra that he knows where Pietro is hiding, and asks her to betray Gennaro in exchange for her son. Azzurra, back home, reveals everything to Gennaro and retires to her room crying, thinking of her betrayal that she has in store for her husband.
58	10	"Episodio 10"	Episode 10	Claudio Cupellini	17 December 2021	N/A
Azzurra manages to lead her husband to Ciro by drugging him with a powerful sleeping pill in a glass of wine. Once recovered, Genny finds the Immortal again after the last time the two faced each other in Riga with the latter locked up in a gulag. Ciro dictates the conditions for the freedom of the boss and his family. Already aware for some time of the preparations for his escape, Ciro will lead Genny to the family home where he will be able to take his son back, and then escape, on condition that the boss declares defeat in front of their people. However, Nunzia arrives and takes her leave at the end of the meeting, bringing Azzurra as a guarantee to remind Ciro of the promise made previously, that is, the death of the Savastanos in front of her eyes. Genny declares defeat as agreed, in front of Ciro and their respective men. Then together with the latter they go by car to the family home, and during the journey, the two make a summary of their lives, their now faded ambitions but above all the turbulent relationships between them. During a stop at a service station, Ciro is seized with guilt, then continues the journey with Genny where he sends 'o Munaciello to kidnap Pasquale Sellero, an official of the family home to be held hostage and forced to help them enter the house where little Pietro is kept. Ciro rushes into the family home when the hostage is unable to convince a man inside the house to enter to take Pietro. Genny arrives some time later when he realizes that he is taking too much time inside the house to take his son, after killing 'o Munaciello, left behind by Ciro to guard him inside the car, with his own gun. Getting his son back leads to the immediate release of little Simone. Nunzia sends her men to the beach first, to then leave separately with Azzurra for her long-awaited revenge. During the journey, however, she is stopped by a fake police checkpoint where she is murdered together with the driver. Azzurra is taken by 'o Bellebuono to be brought to the beach where she can embrace her family again. Ciro has the opportunity to be able to eliminate the whole Savastano family, but taken by a sense of guilt for having lost his family in the past, during the conflict with Don Pietro, he has second thoughts while holding them at gunpoint, and takes them on a boat to safety. However, Genny stays with him after Nunzia's men break into the beach where a bloody shootout ensues by the sea. 'O Pitbull and 'o Bellebuono are killed. After killing many of the attackers together, Genny is killed by a remaining one. As Ciro sheds tears in front of his dead body, he too is shot in the head by an unknown sniper.
