= Sodoma: The Dark Side of Gomorrah =

Sodoma: The Dark Side Of Gomorrah
- Promotional poster
- Sodoma - L'altra faccia di Gomorra
- Directed by: Vincenzo Pirozzi
- Written by: Corrado Ardone
- Cinematography: Giuseppe Cembalo
- Edited by: Giuseppe Cembalo
- Music by: Peppe Bruno
- Release date: 2012
- Running time: 93 min.
- Country: Italy
- Language: Italian

Sodoma: The Dark Side of Gomorrah (Italian: Sodoma - L'altra faccia di Gomorra) is a 2012 Italian comedy Vincenzo Pirozzi. The film is a spoof of Neapolitan mafia films, in particular of Matteo Garrone's Gomorrah. It won the Best Comedy Film award at the 2012 New York City International Film Festival, where it had its world premiere.

== Premise ==
Ciro, Marco, and Ettore live in Naples. Only the Camorra offers stable employment but they need to prove they can be trusted to enter a "family". Therefore, they carry out a series of robberies, but all their criminal efforts go wrong.

== Cast ==
- Germano Bellavia
- Giacomo Rizzo
- Nello Mascia

== Release ==
The film was theatrically released in Italy on April 4, 2013.

== Reception ==
A review at MyMovies.it commented, "The spectator of Sodoma will laugh but of a bitter laugh. The one that make you think. As always happens with comedy when it hits the mark." Another review found, "Pirozzi manages to propose a surreal comedy which, while quoting numerous scenes present in the film of reference, more or less consciously reveals its absurdly tragic dynamics."

A retrospective review lamented the somehow limited distribution of the film in Italian theaters.

== See also ==
- Gomorra, an Italian dramatic series on the same topic (Note: Nello Mascia and Fortunato Cerlino play in both the film and the series.)
