= Security (2021 film) =

- Directed by: Peter Chelsom
- Screenplay by: Peter Chelsom; Tinker Lindsay; Michele Pellegrini; Amina Grenci; Silvio Muccino
- Starring: Marco D'Amore; Maya Sansa; Silvio Muccino; Valeria Bilello; Ludovica Martino; Beatrice Grannò; Tommaso Ragno; Fabrizio Bentivoglio
- Cinematography: Mauro Fiore
- Edited by: Cristiano Travaglioli
- Music by: Andrea Farri
- Release date: 2021
- Language: Italian

Security is a 2021 Italian thriller-mystery film co-written and directed by Peter Chelsom and starring Marco D'Amore and Maya Sansa. Chelsom's first foreign language film, it is based on the novel with the same name by Stephen Amidon.

== Cast ==
- Marco D'Amore as Roberto Santini
- Maya Sansa as Claudia Raffaelli
- Silvio Muccino as Stefano Tommasi
- Valeria Bilello as Elena Ventini
- Ludovica Martino as Angela Santini
- Beatrice Grannò as Maria Spezi
- Tommaso Ragno as Walter Spezi
- Fabrizio Bentivoglio as Curzio Pilati
- Giulio Pranno as Dario Ventini
- Antonio Zavatteri as Colonel Mori

== Production ==
The main set of the film was Forte dei Marmi. Scenes were also shot in Seravezza and Massarosa.

== Release ==
The film had its premiere on 5 June 2021 at the San Giovanni Museum in Fivizzano. It was released on streaming by Sky Italia in Italy and by Netflix in the rest of the world.
