= Nello Mascia =

Italian actor

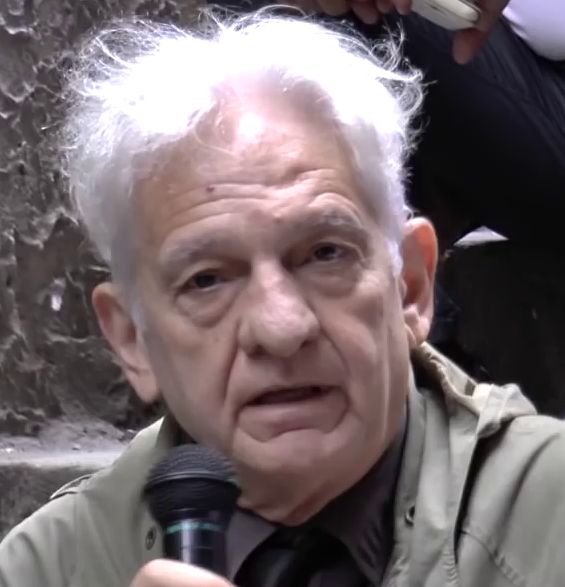
- Mascia in 2016
- Born: 28 December 1946 (age 79); Sala Consilina, Italy
- Occupation: Actor
- Years active: 1971-present

Nello Mascia (born 28 December 1946) is an Italian theater, film and TV actor. He has appeared in more than forty feature films since 1970.

== Life and career ==
Mascia was born in the province of Salerno in 1946. He started his career in the stage company by Eduardo De Filippo, before founding his own company shortly later. He made his feature film in 1972 and played numerous roles in feature films and TV films and series.

Mascia also worked for the theater as stage director, ans is particularly noted as an interpreter of Commedia dell'arte repertoire and of Neapolitan theatre.

== Selected filmography ==
=== Feature films ===
Year	Title	Role	Notes
1982	Delitti, amore e gelosia		
1982	Core mio		
1993	Pacco, doppio pacco e contropaccotto		
1995	The Second Time		
1996	I'm Crazy About Iris Blond		
1998	The Dinner		
1999	Non con un bang		
2001	One Man Up		
2004	City Limits		
2006	The Past Is a Foreign Land		
2007	The Girl by the Lake		
2010	Gorbaciof		
2013	Sodoma - L'altra faccia di Gomorra		
2014	Another South		
2019	L'immortale	Don Aniello Pastore	
2022	Nostalgia		

=== Short films ===
- Mehari (1994) directed by Gianfranco de Rosa

=== Television ===
- La fine di un regno, directed by Alessandro Blasetti (1970)
- L'esperimento, (1971)
- La signora Ava, (1975)
- Storie della camorra, (1978)
- L'eredità della priora, (1980)
- Tre operai (1980)
- Nel regno del Sud, directed by Ansano Giannarelli (1988)
- Sound, miniseries (1988)
- Il conto Montecristo, (1996)
- Un posto al sole, (1996-2001)
- Assunta Spina, miniseries (2006)
- Capri, series(2006-2008)
- Colpi di sole, series (2007)
- Don Matteo 8 /10, series (2011)
- Rossella, series (2012)
- L'oro di Scampia, (2014)
- Il sistema, series (2016)
- Gomorra, series (2016-2021)
- Dov'è Mario?, series (2016)
- Esterno Notte, series (2021)
- Un eroe piccolo piccolo, series (2021)
- Tutto per mio figlio, (2022)
- Noi siamo leggenda, series (2023)
