= Gomorrah (TV series) =

Italian crime drama television series

- Italian: Gomorra - La serie
- Genre: Crime drama; Noir; Serial drama; Tragedy; Thriller
- Created by: Roberto Saviano
- Based on: Gomorrah (2006); by Roberto Saviano
- Starring: Salvatore Esposito; Marco D'Amore; Fortunato Cerlino; Maria Pia Calzone; Marco Palvetti; Fabio De Caro; Cristina Donadio; Cristiana Dell'Anna; Gianfranco Gallo; Ivana Lotito; Arturo Muselli; Andrea Di Maria; Carlo Caracciolo; Loris De Luna; Gianni Parisi; Luciano Giugliano; Antonio Gargiulo; Gennaro Apicella; Claudia Tranchese; Mimmo Borrelli; Tania Garribba; Nunzia Schiano; Carmine Paternoster
- Composer: Mokadelic
- Country of origin: Italy
- Original languages: Neapolitan; Italian
- No. of seasons: 5
- No. of episodes: 58 (list of episodes)

Production
- Executive producers: Roberto Saviano; Paolo Carnera
- Producers: Stefano Sollima; Francesca Comencini
- Running time: 44–55 minutes
- Production companies: Fandango; Cattleya; BETA

Original release
- Network: Sky Atlantic
- Release: 6 May 2014 – 17 December 2021

Related
- The Immortal; Gomorrah: The Origins

Gomorrah (Italian: Gomorra - La serie) is an Italian crime drama television series created by Roberto Saviano for Sky Atlantic. Based on Saviano's book of the same name, the show premiered on Sky Atlantic in Italy on 6 May 2014. The series ran for five seasons totaling 58 episodes until 17 December 2021. The 2008 film of the same name is loosely based on the same book, but unrelated to the TV series.

The show, largely filmed in the Scampia neighbourhood of Naples, tells the story of Ciro Di Marzio (Marco D'Amore), a member of the Camorra's Savastano clan, headed by Pietro Savastano (Fortunato Cerlino), a high-ranking member. Ciro aims to navigate the dangers of the criminal world, while also fighting a brutal civil war. The Savastano family also consists of his wife Immacolata (Maria Pia Calzone) and son, Gennaro (Salvatore Esposito). The show also features rival crime boss Salvatore Conte (Marco Palvetti), while introducing the characters Annalisa Magliocca (Cristina Donadio), Patrizia Santore (Cristiana Dell'Anna), Giuseppe Avitabile (Gianfranco Gallo) and Enzo "Sangueblù" Villa (Arturo Muselli) in the show's later seasons.

The series has gained critical acclaim for its characterization, pacing, atmosphere, acting, directing, and writing. It has also become a ratings hit for Sky, regularly featuring as one of the network's most-watched cable shows.

The series has been sold in 190 countries worldwide. It premiered in the United Kingdom on Sky Atlantic on 4 August 2014; in the United States it debuted on SundanceTV on 24 August 2016 for the first two seasons, and continued on HBO Max since 22 January 2021. The spin-off film The Immortal, which is both a prequel and a sequel to the events after the series' third season, was released on 5 December 2019.

== Premise ==
Set in Naples in the 2010s, the series follows Ciro Di Marzio, a member in the Savastano Camorra clan of Secondigliano, headed by Pietro Savastano. When Pietro is arrested, an internal power struggle breaks out with his rivals as well as between the "old guard" of the clan and the "young guard" headed by his son Gennaro Savastano. Ciro and Gennaro eventually find themselves at odds with their own families, and the several alliances they make with various criminal groups, as they navigate the Naples underworld.

Parts of the series are loosely inspired by the Scampia feud (the series was shot in the Vele di Scampia) and its main actors: Gennaro Savastano is modeled on Cosimo Di Lauro, while his father Pietro Savastano is based on the life of Paolo Di Lauro.

== Cast and characters ==
=== Main characters ===
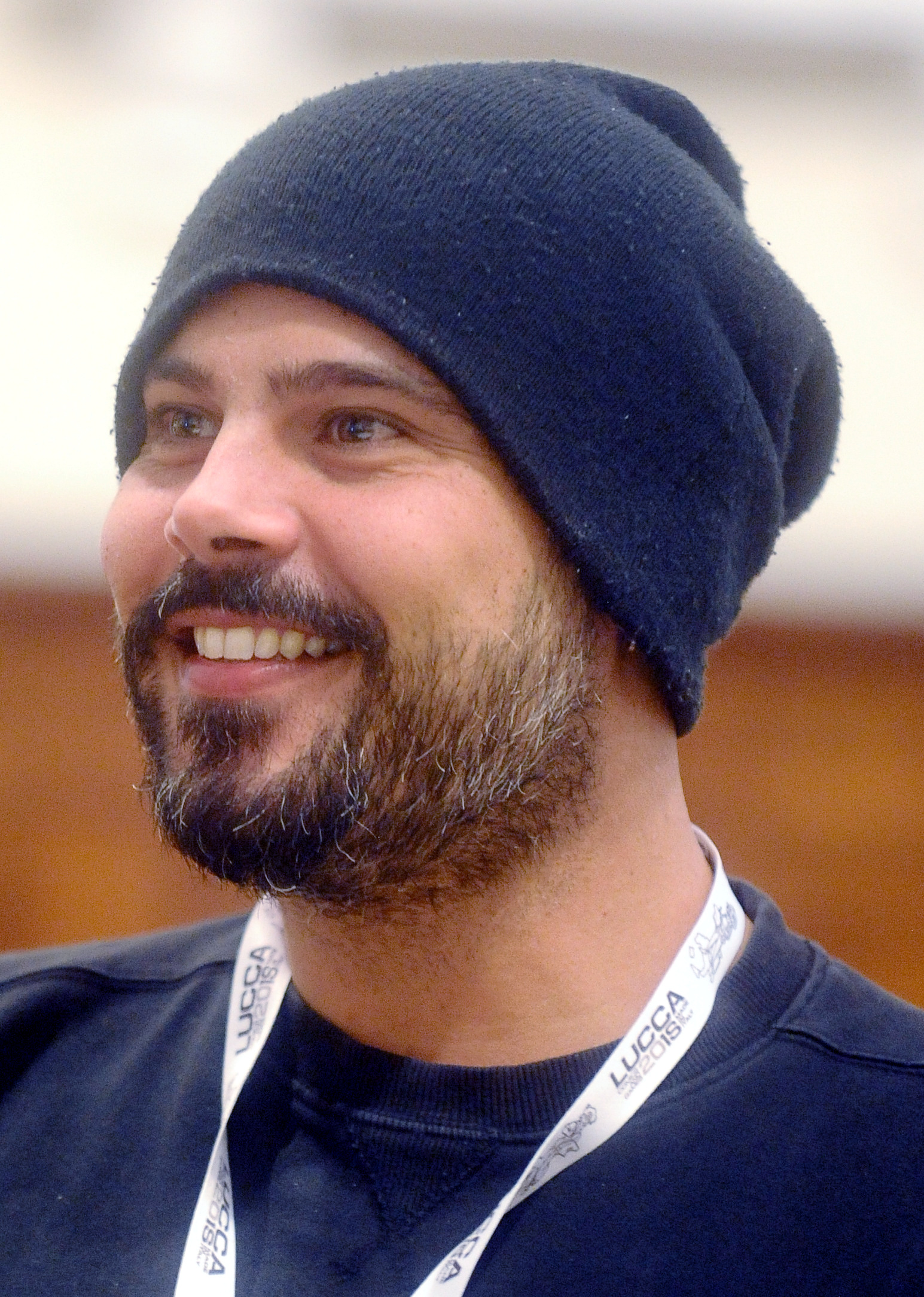
Marco D'Amore as Ciro "l'Immortale" (The Immortal) Di Marzio

- Marco D'Amore as Ciro "l'Immortale" (The Immortal) Di Marzio (seasons 1–3, 5), a member of the Savastano clan who yearns to rise in the criminal hierarchy
- Salvatore Esposito as Gennaro "Genny" Savastano, Pietro's son, who transitions from a spoiled socialite to hardened criminal
- Fortunato Cerlino as Pietro Savastano (seasons 1–2), the head of the Savastano clan and a high-level drug distributor
- Maria Pia Calzone as Immacolata "Imma" Savastano (season 1), Pietro's wife, who seeks to succeed her husband
- Marco Palvetti as Salvatore Conte (seasons 1–2), the leader of the Conte clan, who maintains a troubled relationship with the Savastanos
- Fabio De Caro as "Malammore" (Bad Love) (seasons 1–3), a member of the Savastano clan deeply loyal to Pietro and uncle to Patrizia Santore
- Cristina Donadio as Annalisa "Scianel" Magliocca (seasons 2–3), a local drug dealer who aspires to become a female don, sister of Zecchinetta and mother of Lelluccio
- Cristiana Dell'Anna as Patrizia Santore (seasons 2–4), niece of Malammore and associate of the Savastano clan and, later, sole boss of the Secondigliano territory
- Gianfranco Gallo as Giuseppe Avitabile (seasons 2–3), a rival clan leader based in Rome and father of Azzurra
- Ivana Lotito as Azzurra Avitabile (seasons 2–5), wife of Gennaro Savastano
- Arturo Muselli as Enzo "Sangueblù" (Blue Blood) Villa (seasons 3–5), leader of the Santo clan in Forcella
- Andrea Di Maria as Elia "'o Diplomato" (The Graduate) Capaccio (seasons 3–5), co-leader of the Capaccio clan, nephew to Don Aniello Pastore
- Carlo Caracciolo as Fernando "'o Crezi" (Crazy) Capaccio (seasons 3–4), co-leader of the Capaccio clan, nephew to Don Aniello Pastore
- Loris De Luna as Valerio "'o Vucabulà" (The Vocabulary) Misano (seasons 3–4), Enzo's right-hand man and influential member of the Santo clan
- Gianni Parisi as Gerlando Levante (season 4), Boss of a powerful clan in the province of Caserta, he is Genny's uncle on his mother's side
- Luciano Giugliano as Michelangelo "Mickey" Levante (season 4), Gerlando's favorite son, unlike his brothers, he was able to study and get a degree
- Gennaro Apicella as Francesco Ciccio Levante (seasons 4–5), Arm of the Levante family, very attached to their father Gerlando, whose orders are meticulously carried out
- Antonio Gargiulo as Saro Levante (seasons 4–5), brother of Francis and Michelangelo Levante, armed wing of his family, he is very close to his father Gerlando, whose orders he carries out together with his brother Francesco
- Claudia Tranchese as Grazia Levante (seasons 4–5), the youngest daughter of the clan leader Gerlando Levante, and therefore the only sister of Michelangelo, Ciccio and Saro Levante
- Mimmo Borrelli as Angelo 'o Maestrale (Mistral) (season 5), the boss of Ponticelli who is fundamental in Genny's war against the Levantes
- Tania Garribba as Luciana (season 5), wife of 'o Maestrale
- Nunzia Schiano as Nunzia Carignano (season 5), wife of Vincenzo Carignano 'o Galantommo
- Carmine Paternoster as Federico Maccauro "'o Munaciello" (Little Monk) (season 5), square boss of Secondigliano

=== Recurring characters ===
- Antonio Milo as Attilio Diotallevi (season 1), one of the "Old" affiliates of the Savastano family, a close friend of Ciro, who regards him as a father
- Simona Capozzi as Antonietta Diotallevi (season 1), the wife of Attilio Diotallevi
- Massimiliano Rossi as "Zecchinetta" (Lansquenet) (season 1), one of the "Old" members of the Savastano clan, brother of Scianel and uncle of Lelluccio
- Mimmo Esposito as Renato Bolletta (season 1), one of the "Old" members affiliated with the Savastano family, the manager of the Piazza dei Smurci outlet
- Walter Lippa as Carlucciello "'o Pisciavindola" (The Fishmonger) (season 1), one of the "Old" Savastano clan members
- Ivan Boragine as Michele Casillo (seasons 1, 3–4), one of Genny Savastano's best friends and candidate for mayor
- Gaetano Di Vaio as "'o Baroncino" (The Little Baron) (season 1), one of the "Old" loyalists of Savastano
- Alfonso Postiglione as Vitale "'o Fringuello" (The Chaffinch) (season 1), one of the "Old" members of the Savastano gang and brother of 'o Zingaro
- Giovanni Allocca as Vitale "'o Zingaro" (The Gipsy) (season 1), one of the "Old" Savastano associates and brother of 'o Fringuello
- Claudio Corinaldesi as Aniello l'Africano (season 1), a member of the Savastano clan
- Emilio Vacca as Alfredo "'a Lisca" (The Fishbone) (season 1), a member of the Savastano family
- Carlo Guitto as Lino "Centocapelli" (100 Hairs) (season 1), a member of the Savastano family
- Carmine Battaglia as Pino (season 1), one of the "Young" members of the Savastano clan
- Emanuele Vicorito as 'o Pop (season 1), one of the "Young" affiliates of the Savastano gang
- Alessio Gallo as Tonino Spiderman (season 1), one of the "Young" affiliates of Savastano, nephew of Carlucciello 'o Pisciavindola
- Vincenzo Sacchettino as Daniele "Danielino" (season 1), a 16-year-old mechanic, fascinated by the world of the Camorra, easily manipulated by Ciro Di Marzio
- Domenico Balsamo as Massimo (season 1), brother of Danielino and personal driver of Salvatore Conte
- Antonio Zavatteri as Franco Musi (season 1), accountant of the Savastanos and husband to Gaia
- Annamaria Malipiero as Gaia Musi (season 1), wife of accountant Franco Musi and mother of Perla
- Matilde Gioli as Perla (season 1), daughter of Gaia, wife of accountant Franco Musi, to whom he is very close, loved as if she were his natural daughter
- Rinat Khismatouline as Vitaly Eremenko (season 1), leader of the Russian mafia that operates in Barcelona
- Michelangelo Dalisi as Salvo Nunziata (season 1), an informant of Pietro Savastano, instructed by the latter to find information on the member of the clan guilty of having carried out the tip on the cocaine cargo coming from Honduras
- Rosario D'Angelo as Augusto Parisi (season 1), the Capacamorra of Casavatore
- David Power as Pasqualino (season 1), a young drug addict who has been detained at the Poggioreale prison due to a robbery at a Mergellina jewelry store. Entering the prison under the protection of Pietro Savastano, immediately after his arrest
- Francesco Murolo as Antonio (season 1), an old friend of Pietro Savastano, detained at the Poggioreale prison
- Tommaso Palladino as Rino (season 1), a penitentiary policeman on duty at the prison of Poggioreale, a loyal follower of Pietro Savastano, who helps him, during his detention, to find a cell phone clandestinely
- Sidy Diop as Tokumbo (season 1), a member of the gang of Nigerians who pass off the drugs bought by Savastano intentionally imprisoned in Poggioreale, Naples to speak directly with Pietro Savastano to retract their agreement and profits
- Lello Serao as Prison Commander (season 1), commander of the guards of the Poggioreale penitentiary. During Pietro Savastano's stay in prison he will try to oppose his communications with the outside by subjecting him to the same treatment as the other prisoners. He will eventually feign giving up, just to collect the proofs to send him to the special jail.
- Susy Di Benedetto as Marta Giacobone (season 1), a young lesbian girl who, after the suicide of her father is in debt with a loan shark, Leccalecca
- Nuccio Siano as Franco "Leccalecca" (Lollipop) (season 1), a loan shark
- Luisa Esposito as Marina (season 1), Donna Imma's assistant and driver
- Elena Margaret Starace as Noemi (season 1), the first girlfriend of Genny Savastano
- Antonella Carillo as Jessica Chianese (season 1), the second girlfriend of Genny Savastano and daughter of Demetrio Chianese, a well-known doctor from Giugliano in Campania
- Oscar di Maio as Fabretti (season 1), defeated in the local elections by Michele Casillo, the young candidate for mayor supported by Genny Savastano
- Pietro Juliano as Antonino "Tonino" Russo (season 1), a prominent exponent of the Conte clan
- Antonio Orefice as Bruno (season 1), a young friend of Danielino
- Denise Perna as Manu (season 1), the young girlfriend of Danielino, inspired by Gelsomina Verde
- Carlo Musella as Pablo (seasons 1–2), the bodyguard of Salvatore Conte in Barcelona
- Carmine Monaco as "'o Track" (seasons 1–2), entered the world of the Camorra as one of the new pupils of Genny Savastano
- Lino Musella as Rosario Ercolano "'o Nano" (The Dwarf) (seasons 1–2), the best friend and right-hand man of Ciro Di Marzio
- Pina Turco as Deborah Di Marzio (seasons 1–2), the wife of Ciro and mother of Maria Rita
- Claudia Veneziano as Maria Rita Di Marzio (seasons 1–2), the daughter of Ciro and Deborah Di Marzio
- Vincenzo Fabricino as Lorenzo "'o Pitbull" (seasons 1–2, 5), a member of the Savastano family, a friend of Ciro Di Marzio
- Giovanni Buselli as "Capa 'e Bomba" (Bomb Head) (seasons 1–3), one of the "Young" members of the Savastano gang
- Christian Giroso as Carmeniello "'o Cardillo" (The Goldfinch) (seasons 1–3), one of the "Young" members of Savastano
- Gianluca Di Gennaro as "'o Zingariello" (The Little Gipsy) (season 2), son of 'o Zingaro and nephew of 'o Fringuello, "Old" members of the Savastano clan
- Alessandra Langella as Nina (season 2), a transsexual girl who works as a singer at ceremonies
- Antonio Folletto as Gabriele "'o Principe" (The Prince) (season 2), lieutenant of Salvatore Conte and very skilled at cutting cocaine. After the death of Conte, he joined Ciro's Alliance
- Liana Balogun as Azmera (season 2), a black girl, girlfriend of 'o Principe
- Nino Porzio as Nino (season 2), Genny Savastano's personal driver
- Luca Gallone as Totò called "'o Mulatto" (season 2), a lieutenant of Salvatore Conte, then Ciro
- Michele Rosiello as Mario Cantapane (season 2), Scianel's personal driver
- Vincenzo Nemolato as Angelo Sepino (season 2), a young criminal who becomes the protagonist of a robbery against the Alliance
- Arturo Sepe as Angioletto (season 2), a soldier of Pietro Savastano
- Vincenzo Pirozzi as Raffaele Magliocca, known as Lelluccio (season 2), the son of Scianel, Marinella's husband
- Nello Mascia as Don Aniello Pastore (seasons 2–5), an old boss of a Camorra branch operating in the central area of Naples and allied to Giuseppe Avitabile, uncle of the Capaccio brothers
- Luigi Pisani as Tommaso Natale (seasons 2–3), the right-hand man of Giuseppe Avitabile
- Gianni Spezzano as Fernando (seasons 2–5), a soldier of Ciro, often also acting as his bodyguard along with 'o Pitbull
- Francesco Verde as Domenico (seasons 2–3), Scianel's bodyguard
- Luca Varone as Sergio (seasons 2–3), a soldier under the command of Pietro Savastano after his escape
- Giovanni Rienzo as "'o Foal" (seasons 2–3), a soldier under the command of Pietro Savastano after his escape, often accompanying Malammore
- Pasquale Russo as "'a Zeppola" (seasons 2–4), one of Pietro Savastano's soldiers after his escape
- Denise Capezza as Marinella (seasons 2–3), the wife of Scianel's son, Lelluccio Magliocca
- Antonio Ciccone as "'a Lince" (The Lynx) (seasons 2–3), a soldier under the command of Pietro Savastano after his escape
- Alfredo Herrera as Joaquin Rollero (seasons 2–3), one of the Honduran traffickers who becomes a trusted friend of Genny
- Gaetano Amato as "'o Ghepardo" (The Cheetah) (seasons 2–4), one of the Alley Boys, allied to Genny
- Riccardo Ciccarelli as Nicola (seasons 2–4), a member of the Alley Boys
- Salvatore Vacca as "'o Flipper" (The Pinball) (seasons 2–4), one of the Alley Boys, Genny's ally
- Carlo Cerciello as Don Ruggero "'o Stregone" (The Wizard) (season 3), the most important capocamorra within the Confederates, granduncle of Enzo
- Edoardo Sorgente as "Gegè" (season 3), a boy who studied in England from Secondigliano and a friend of Genny, who later becomes his accountant in Rome
- Pasquale Esposito as Edoardo Arenella "'o Sciarmant" (The Charming) (season 3), Capocamorra of Forcella and the Spanish Quarters and a member of the Confederates
- Angela Ciaburri as Carmela Villa (season 3), Enzo's sister
- Roberto Olivieri as Ronni (3–5), a soldier in Enzo's clan
- Alessandro Palladino as "'o Bellebbuono" (seasons 3–5), a member of the Enzo clan, of which he is one of the most important members
- Eugenio Marzella as Eliuccio (seasons 3–4), a soldier in Enzo's clan
- Marcello Gravina as "'o Frisbi" (The Frisbee) (seasons 3–4), a soldier in Enzo's clan
- Livio Cori as "'o Selfi" (seasons 3–4), a soldier in Enzo's clan
- Mariano Coletti as "'o Cantonese" (seasons 3–5), a soldier in Enzo's clan and friend of Ronni
- Francesco Capriello as "'a Golia (seasons 3–4), a soldier in Enzo's clan
- Gina Amarante as Maria (seasons 3–4), Enzo's girlfriend and is the only female member in his clan
- Roberto Russo as "Topmodel" (seasons 3–4), a soldier of the Enzo clan
- Francesco Da Vinci as "MMA" (seasons 3–5), one of Enzo's men
- Riccardo Marotta as "'o Snicher" (seasons 3–4), a soldier from the Forcella clan
- Alessio Galati as Lino (season 4), cousin of Nicola
- Andrea Renzi as Alberto Resta (season 4), estimated and skilled successful manager who goes into business with Genny for the construction of the airport
- Gennaro Maresca as Walter Ruggeri (seasons 4–5), a magistrate
- Pavel Zelinskiy as Igor (seasons 4–5), a Croatian broker who handles drug shipments to Secondigliano
- Daniela Ioia as Tiziana Palumbo (seasons 4–5), an assistant commissioned by Alberto Resta
- Ciro Esposito as Raffaele (seasons 4–5), the spokesman of 'o Maestrale
- Lucienne Perreca as Lavinia (season 5), sister of Luciana and the wife of 'o Jaccio
- Antonio Ferrante as Vincenzo Carignano 'o Galantommo (The Gentleman) (season 5), the elderly boss of a small town on the slopes of Vesuvius
- Vincenzo Borrelli as Carmelo Lo Diacono (season 5), the armed wing of the Carignanos
- Giampiero De Concilio as Cosimo Maccauro "Canzuncella" (season 5), the younger brother of 'o Munaciello
- Renato De Simone as 'o Jaccio (season 5), the brother-in-law of Luciana
- Gennaro Basile as 'o King (season 5), foreman of Secondigliano
- Michele Cantalupo as Uocchiebell' (season 5), a Secondigliano square boss
- Viktor Ferin as Ilya Kurianov (season 5), a Russian smuggler and friend of Dimitri
- Anatolijs Fečins as Dimitri (season 5), former associate of Yuri Dobeshenko, Russian underworld boss in the spin-off film The Immortal

== Episodes ==
Season	Episodes	Originally released	
Season	Episodes	First released	Last released
1	12	6 May 2014	10 June 2014
2	12	10 May 2016	14 June 2016
3	12	17 November 2017	22 December 2017
4	12	29 March 2019	3 May 2019
5	10	19 November 2021	17 December 2021

=== Season 1 (2014) ===
In Naples, the Savastano clan is commanded by the dreaded and respected Pietro Savastano. Looking to make his mark, Ciro Di Marzio is tasked to burn the house of the mother of Salvatore Conte, a rival drug lord. After completing the task without hesitation and slowly gaining the trust of Pietro, the elder Savastano later entrusts Ciro to ready his son Gennaro to become the future head of the clan.

Following a police check, Pietro is arrested and taken into custody; control of the clan unofficially passes into the hands of his wife, Immacolata, who deems Ciro and Gennaro unable to run the clan in Pietro's absence. Immacolata, who maintains a dislike for Ciro, orders him to travel to Spain in order to make up with Conte and reunite the clans. She later tasks Gennaro to travel to Honduras, hoping his interactions with drug producers will fast-track his development into becoming head of the clan. Despite being able to make peace with Conte, Ciro is frozen out by Immacolata, a sentiment that is shared by Gennaro once he returns to Naples. Gennaro, becoming more detached and isolated, begins a cleanup of the clan's members, inviting more younger comrades, while engaging in actions that grow distrust amongst the old guard, including Ciro, who find Gennaro unable to handle the clan. A civil war then ensues between the two factions of the Savastano clan: the old guard who are faithful to Pietro and the younger members who are faithful to Gennaro.

Ciro, feeling ignored and devalued by Gennaro, aligns with the old guard, seeking to shift the internal equilibrium of the clan. Ciro also solicits support from Conte, managing to obtain Conte's respect during his trip to Spain. Ciro begins by killing Immacolata; however, Gennaro quickly discovers Ciro's betrayal and, no longer knowing whom to trust, enlists the members loyal to him in order to dismantle the old guard he believes to be Ciro's accomplices. Gennaro largely succeeds, killing everyone besides Ciro and Malammore, both of whom manage to go into hiding. Gennaro later discovers Ciro's whereabouts, sending the members loyal to him to kill him, but they are intercepted and brutally massacred by Conte's clan. Gennaro is later shot by Ciro, while Malammore breaks Pietro out of a police transport van during a prison transfer.

=== Season 2 (2016) ===
Following his escape from prison, Pietro realizes that his stay in Naples will be short-lived, and promptly flees to Cologne, leaving the clan in the hands of Malammore and the rest of the members that aided his escape. He also plots to seek vengeance on the people who ambushed Gennaro, who survived his shooting. Ciro, meanwhile, forms an alliance with Conte, at the expense of his relationship with his wife, Debora.

A year later, Gennaro is healed from his injuries and reunites with his father in Germany, where they align with the Avitabiles. After an arms deal goes awry, Pietro becomes wary of his power waning, and decides to return to Naples alone to resume control of the clan. Ciro and other members of Conte's clan encounter trouble with Conte, disliking his aims at creating a monopoly and gaining absolute power. They then devise a successful scheme to kill him. Pietro views this as the perfect opportunity to exact revenge, taking advantage of the disjointed clan by murdering several of them. Ciro learns of Pietro's return, and wishes to negotiate a settlement. Malammore's niece, Patrizia, informs Ciro that he will only be able to negotiate with Gennaro. Wary of a potential ambush, Ciro goes to Giuseppe, a mutual friend of his and Gennaro's, to act as guarantor during their negotiations. Gennaro eventually accepts the settlement conditions set by Ciro, which infuriates Pietro. Gennaro explains killing Ciro would have caused a war without any boundaries and expresses his wish to focus on business.

Pietro rejects the settlement, and continues to wage war, revealing to Patrizia that he wishes to defeat his son for undermining him. He is also suspicious of Patrizia's loyalties. After violently killing another member of the clan, he plants evidence to make it appear as though the murder was a result of in-house betrayal. In-fighting then becomes rife within the clan. However, after failing to subvert another member, Ciro learns of the true murderer and informs Gennaro. After Pietro murders Ciro's daughter, Ciro decides to murder Pietro. Disgusted by his father's actions, while also wishing to raise his son, named Pietro after his grandfather, in a world without in-fighting or violence, Gennaro agrees and informs Ciro of Pietro's whereabouts. Ciro murders Pietro at the Savastano family burial plot.

=== Season 3 (2017) ===
Gennaro assumes full control of all drug trade in Naples. He becomes feared and respected among the underworld. Ciro loses the will to continue, and after killing Malammore to avenge his daughter, moves to Sofia to work for Valentin, an associate. He later finds out Mladen (Valentin's son) tried to set him up, and since he's Valentin's successor, Valentin hesitantly orders Ciro's death. Ciro murders Valentin and his son Mladen, and returns to Naples, while Giuseppe is in prison after Gennaro reveals his criminal past to the police.

Giuseppe quickly avoids jail time by agreeing to a plea deal, and is placed on house arrest instead. He then orders the systematic destruction of Gennaro and his criminal empire, robbing and killing his lieutenants, which leaves him isolated in his war against Giuseppe. Gennaro then seeks assistance from Ciro and Annalisa, who are both eager to return to power. Ciro initially aims to locate allies outside Naples. He meets Enzo and Valerio, members of the Santo clan, who convince him only people from the city truly wish for Giuseppe's demise. Together, they help Gennaro resume business, while Gennaro also bribes lawmakers and police officials to aid his cause.

Enzo begins to have reservations when many of his men begin to die at the hands of the Confederates, and wishes to leave. The Confederates, outraged, attempt to murder his sister by bombing the restaurant she works at, which begins a war between Enzo and Valerio, against them. Ciro desperately proposes an armistice, which is reluctantly accepted. Enzo's reservations are maintained, which forces Gennaro to kill his sister, which he then blames on Arenella (a member of the Confederates). This increases Enzo's involvement, and they successfully organize an ambush on Giuseppe and Arenella.

Following this, Ciro pushes Gennaro to create peace with all their enemies. Peace is eventually accepted, and Gennaro divides the city and other land to the people who helped him win. Patrizia later kills Annalisa, which arouses Enzo's suspicions, as Patrizia vocally opposed murder during the war. He later stalks her, and learns Gennaro was involved in his sister's murder. Inviting both him and Ciro on his yacht under the pretense of celebration, Enzo reveals his intentions to kill Gennaro. Prior to shooting him, however, Ciro sacrifices himself in his place by admitting to murdering his sister, stating his desire to avoid another war, and wishing to re-join his family in heaven. Enzo then forces Gennaro to kill Ciro.

=== Season 4 (2019) ===
Genny commemorates the death of his close friend Ciro Di Marzio together with Sangueblù. Then on a promise previously made to Azzurra, he decides to change his life but first, he tries to end a war that the Capaccio brothers have started against him. Due to the help of the Levante family, a powerful underworld clan of Villa Literno, he manages to end it before it begins. The head of the Levantes, Gerlando, is Genny's uncle (who is married to his mother Imma's cousin). At a meeting, Genny dictated the terms of peace in front of Patrizia, Enzo, Valerio, the Capaccio brothers and Gerlando with his three sons, Saro, Michelangelo and Francesco. Patrizia is given total control over Secondigliano. This one, in turn, supplies the squares with drugs, at agreed prices, without creating competition between the components of the Alliance. Genny then announces his retirement and changes his life.

A year later he reinvented himself as an entrepreneur and aimed to build a second airport in Campania, all in a legal manner with the help of manager Alberto Resta, and his entrusted assistant Tiziana Palumbo. He buys lots of land and consortia for the realization of the project, even abroad, such as London. Nevertheless his past, from time to time, tends to resurface. Patrizia is fully the boss of Secondigliano, and she has a secret relationship with Michelangelo Levante, the second son of the family. The rest of Michelangelo's family, except his sister Grazia, are against the relationship. Gerlando then tells Patrizia, but the woman then reiterates her full willingness to remain at Michelangelo's side.

The boss of Secondigliano later has a big problem with a shipment of drugs seized by the police and undertakes, at a meeting with members of the Alliance, to pay the next shipment at her own expense, to make up for the financial losses of those who had paid the one seized. The Capaccios want to be repaid immediately to reinvest in a new channel and Patrizia borrows the money from Genny. The latter agrees but asks for the author of the complaint which then led to the seizure of her cargo. A good part of it is still on the streets thanks to an African criminal group. Patrizia's most trusted man, Nicola, investigates the matter with his cousin Lino. With the excuse of wanting to buy a batch of drugs from the Africans, Nicola tries to get to the bottom of the matter, and at the appointment to buy the goods, he finds out. The Levantes were behind the stolen shipment because they do not want Patrizia at the helm of Secondigliano. Saro and Francesco kill Lino, and force Nicola to kill Patrizia threatening to murder his family if he doesn't cooperate. Michelangelo is informed through Grazia of their intent and restrains Nicola, who is about to kill Patrizia. He takes him to the family vineyard for a clarification with his brothers. Michelangelo cannot go against his family and kills Nicola with his own gun. Then he is informed by Patrizia that she is expecting a child by him.

Meanwhile, Genny has problems with the bodies that emerge outside the building of the multi-storey car park of the airport, and he begins to have the judiciary on his tail. He has Alberto, his partner, killed when he learns from Tiziana of her interview with the prosecutor, for fear that she might reveal, sooner or later, his name behind the project. He accompanies Patrizia to the altar who marries Michelangelo, and as a gift he gives her the total dominion of Secondigliano. Finally, he promotes Tiziana as the new managing director for the airport, but he begins to regret the project.

Valerio tries in great secrecy to discover, together with 'a Golia, Cantonese and MMA who is behind the seizure of the cargo. To do this, he enters into a fake secret agreement with the Capaccios, of whom he suspects a lot about the affair. At a second meeting with them, he first delivers a letter to his father to be delivered to Enzo in case something unpleasant should happen to him, he knows the truth previously discovered by Nicola, and finds his treasonous death at the hands of 'a Golia, who accompanied him to the meeting. The latter then makes a real agreement, with the Capaccios and the Levantes to take out Sangueblù. Thanks to the unexpected visit of Valerio's father, Sangueblù reads the letter that he delivers to him and understands the reason for his friend's secret initiatives before dying. He then sets a trap for his enemies and the traitor 'a Golia with a fake appointment for a new drug channel and kills 'a Golia and 'o Crezi.

A sudden police roundup lands Patrizia in custody. In a conversation with the magistrate Walter Ruggieri, she discovers that her husband is behind the loss of the shipment. Genny is informed by Fernando about the arrest of Patrizia and tries to get her a lawyer who can get her out immediately, to prevent the woman from talking about him, in front of Ruggieri. But Azzurra wants her dead, to avoid losing the investments made so far. Patrizia begins to talk about her enemies in front of Ruggieri, in a well-protected place, but the magistrate wants much more information: that of Genny Savastano. Sangueblù has changed his hiding place after the failed ambush at the Levantes'. 'O Diplomato finds Maria, Sangueblù's girlfriend, together with two other men whom he had left to guard her, and kills them. Genny ambushes the Levantes and kills Gerlando, his wife and their escort. He sends Fernando and another man to relieve Patrizia and Michelangelo from the hiding place of the prosecution. Genny commissions a plane to get them to leave Italy. At the airbase, he has a private talk with Patrizia. He asks her if she spoke about him in front of Ruggieri, during the deposition made in the prosecutor's office, but she denies it. Michelangelo, already waiting on the plane, is shot and killed. Genny then pulls a gun on her and kills her. Finally Genny goes to his bunker where his fugitive begins.

=== Season 5 (2021) ===
A fugitive in a bunker in Ponticelli, under the strict protection of the ferocious boss Don Angelo, known as o' Maestrale, Genny evades the police on his tail and at the same time tries to recover Secondigliano from the hands of the surviving Levantes. During the war he discovers through the mouth of Don Aniello, an ally of the latter together with his nephew 'o Diplomato, that Ciro Di Marzio is still alive. He joins him in Riga after having killed them both and between the two it seems the beginning of a newfound relationship. Instead, a war will start after Genny reveals his feelings of abandonment and betrayal towards him, after the episode on the boat that led to his apparent death, with remorse on his conscience for having killed him. There is no point in Ciro denying it, nor even presenting Genny as the new broker in place of the deceased Don Aniello, during a business negotiation with a Russian trafficker. At the end of the evening, Genny locks up Ciro in a gulag and returns to Naples, taking back his neighborhood from the Levantes.

Ciro manages to escape by feigning death by hanging and returns to Secondigliano. Thus he starts a war that sees allies with him the most faithful 'o Pitbull and the old clan of Forcella, of which he had been the master to some extent. In the ensuing conflict, the Immortal emerges victorious and manages to expand his army due to Sangueblù and the support of Nunzia, widow of 'o Galantommo, killed on Genny's orders. Ciro then steals the Levantes' shipments which he needs to supply his squares. He finally receives the help of an unexpected ally, Luciana, wife of 'o Maestrale, after she smells defeat in Gennaro in the ongoing war. Ciro and Nunzia stipulate an agreement with her: one million euros in exchange for the names of the business partners who collaborate with their opponent. Then due to Azzurra, who had previously cleared her husband of murder charges before the magistrate Walter Ruggieri, as well as having escaped an attack by Nunzia's men, she discovers Luciana's scam and orders her husband to kill her. Genny entrusts this deed to 'o Maestrale, who hides her in secret instead. Ciro defeats him definitively after losing Ronni and Sangueblù in the battle, reduced to death after being tortured by Genny with punches, kicks and blows with iron bars. After Carmelo Lo Diacono appears before Ruggieri admitting to the ambush that he himself had failed against Azzurra and her son, little Pietro is taken to a family home due to his dangerous living conditions. Genny later kidnaps Simone, Ruggieri's son.

They go together to the Maccauro house where Ciro then forces 'o Munaciello to call Ruggieri, who in the meantime has discovered the location of the family home where little Pietro is being held and reports to him. Upon receiving the information, Ciro treacherously kills 'o Maestrale, and orders 'o Munaciello to bring him Azzurra, and 'o Bellebuono to eliminate Luciana. In front of Azzurra, Ciro blackmails her into bringing him her husband for information about the location of the family home. Azzurra sends Genny into catalepsy with a powerful sleeping pill in a glass of wine and brings him to Ciro. Ciro and Genny meet again face to face after the last meeting they had in Latvia. In this new confrontation, Ciro proposes to fetch Pietro together with his father, on the condition that he declare surrender before their respective men. However, Nunzia arrives who wants her revenge as agreed with Ciro, and to guarantee that he will fulfill his promise, she takes Azzurra hostage. The Immortal apparently complies and, after having reunited Genny with his son, contacts Nunzia to join them on the beach, who, shortly before leaving, orders six of her men to go to the same beach. Even the magistrate Ruggieri is reunited with his son, while 'o nMunaciello is shot dead by Genny, accused by the latter of being a villain. During the journey, she is stopped by a fake police checkpoint where she is murdered together with the driver. Azzurra is taken by 'o Bellebuono to be brought to the beach where she can embrace her family again. Ciro has the opportunity to be able to eliminate the whole Savastano family, but taken by a sense of guilt for having lost his family in the past, during the conflict with Don Pietro, he has second thoughts while holding them at gunpoint, and takes them on a boat to safety. However, Genny stays with him after Nunzia's men break into the beach where a bloody shootout ensues by the sea. 'O Pitbull and 'o Bellebuono are killed. After killing many of the attackers together, Genny is killed by a remaining one. As Ciro sheds tears in front of his dead body, he too is shot in the head by a sniper by an unknown assailant.

== Broadcast and release ==
The show's first season premiered on Sky Atlantic and Sky Cinema 1 in Italy on 6 May 2014. It also aired on Rai 3 on 10 January 2015. Season 2 aired on 10 May 2016, season 3 on 17 November 2017, and season 4 on 29 March 2019. The fifth season was released in 2021.

After the success on television, the series also had a limited theatrical release by The Space Movies and Universal Pictures. The first season was screened on 200 Italian theaters from 22 September 2014, with three episodes per evening (150 minutes) for four consecutive Mondays.

The show's success has spawned its release to international markets, being sold in 190 countries worldwide. It premiered in the United Kingdom on Sky Atlantic on 4 August 2014, and in the United States on SundanceTV on 24 August 2016. The series was also released on Netflix in some countries (including in the US, Australia and New Zealand) and on SBS on Demand in Australia from 16 October 2020.

All the episodes and the movie are also set to be released on HBO Max in the US; season 3 debuted on 21 January 2021.

== Reception ==
=== Critical response ===
Gomorrah is one of Sky's most-watched cable shows, and has gained critical acclaim for its characterization, pacing, atmosphere, acting, directing, and writing. The first season holds a 95% rating on review aggregation website Rotten Tomatoes, based on 19 reviews and with an average rating of 7.31/10. The website's critics consensus reads: "Gomorrah brings a refreshing twist to a familiar story, with its realistic, unglamorous and often riveting portrayal of a Neapolitan crime organization". On Metacritic, it has a rating of 76 out of 100, based on 15 reviews.

Ben Travers of IndieWire called it the "darker, grown-up version of The Sopranos" and stated, "[d]espite its familiar construction, Gomorrah is significantly more frightening than others in its genre because of the history behind it." Mary McNamara of the Los Angeles Times wrote: "Aggressively dark, focused to the point of claustrophobia and often all but choking on its own authenticity, Gomorrah shocks the system like a real Italian espresso after years of skinny vanilla lattes ... in Gomorrah, familiarity breeds relief rather than contempt." Brian Moylan of The Guardian stated, "[f]or those who like mafia shows and the sort of anti-hero dramas that have become the stock in trade of 'peak TV', this is another excellent entry." Sight & Sound called the series "Italy's answer to Breaking Bad."

However, the show has received criticism from several Italian politicians. Naples mayor Luigi de Magistris claimed that bouts of violent crimes skyrocket in the city whenever an episode of the series is aired. He also added that the series "is likely to corrode the brains, souls, and hearts of hundreds of very young people." Anti-Mafia magistrate Giuseppe Borrelli has stated, "[t]he series fails to capture any aspect of today's Camorra", the national anti-mafia prosecutor Federico Cafiero de Raho has stated, "it humanizes gangsters", while the state prosecutor in Catanzaro Nicola Gratteri has stated, "It makes them seem likable, which is dangerous."

== Spin-offs ==
A spin-off film titled The Immortal (L'immortale) was released in theaters on 5 December 2019. The film is both a prequel set in 1980 and a sequel to the events after the series' third season, and stars Marco D'Amore reprising his role as Ciro Di Marzio.

A prequel series titled Gomorrah: The Origins premiered on Sky Atlantic on January 9, 2026.
