= The Immortal (2019 film) =

2019 film directed by Marco D'Amore

- Theatrical release poster
- Italian: L'immortale
- Directed by: Marco D'Amore
- Written by: Marco D'Amore; Leonardo Fasoli; Maddalena Ravagli; Francesco Ghiaccio; Giulia Forgione
- Produced by: Marco Chimenz; Gina Gardini; Giovanni Stabilini; Riccardo Tozzi
- Starring: Marco D'Amore; Salvatore D'Onofrio; Giuseppe Aiello; Giovanni Vastarella; Marianna Robustelli; Martina Attanasio; Gennaro Di Colandrea; Nello Mascia; Aleksey Guskov; Salvatore Esposito
- Cinematography: Guido Michelotti
- Edited by: Patrizio Marone
- Music by: Mokadelic
- Distributed by: Vision Distribution
- Release date: 5 December 2019
- Running time: 116 minutes
- Country: Italy
- Languages: Neapolitan; Italian
- Box office: €6 million

The Immortal (Italian: L'immortale) is a 2019 Italian crime drama film directed by Marco D'Amore. The film is both a prequel and a sequel to the events after the third season of the TV series Gomorrah.

== Plot ==
Following being near fatally shot by Gennaro Savastano on a boat in the Gulf of Naples, Ciro Di Marzio is rescued and given incognito medical care. He is then employed by crime boss Don Aniello Pastore who has links to the Russian mafia in Latvia, run by Yuri Dobeshenko, who are at odds with native Latvian gangs. Ciro moves to Latvia to become Pastore's negotiator with Dobeshenko, after which he is kidnapped by a Latvian gang which demands the Italians sell cocaine to them instead.

Ciro becomes reacquainted with his childhood mentor Bruno who, under the auspices of Pastore, processes imported clothing to resell as "designer labels", and acts as a go-between with Ciro. Bruno provides accommodation for Ciro with his gang family, which includes Virgilio and his wife Vera.

Ciro ostensibly drives drugs to a meeting with the Latvians. However, the consignment contains Russians who kill most of the Latvians, the drugs being delivered by Bruno to Dobeshenko. Bruno's family questioned the safety of processing large quantities of cocaine, but saw they had no choice, especially after Ciro provided a large Russian payment while stating that Bruno's family would work for him, not Pastore. Virgilio brought news of a worsening situation in Naples, but the continued security of Gennaro Savastano. Ciro, when questioned, explained he asked Gennaro to shoot him.

A year later, while Bruno told Ciro he had decided to return to Naples, a further shipment of drugs is stolen under force by the Latvians. Dobeshenko said the loss was Ciro's responsibility and that he should retrieve the drugs. To make his point, Dobeshenko shot Virgilio dead.

Ciro takes Bruno to negotiate with the Latvians, telling them he has switched sides. He returns and counsels caution to Bruno's gang's wives, and asks for Vera's help. Ciro again takes Bruno to meet the Latvians, driving together in a car convoy with the Latvian in tow; the Latvians' cars explode. Ciro tells Bruno that he knew it was him who helped set up the Latvian raid. Bruno expresses his resentment of Ciro for everything he became that he did not. Ciro tells of his bitterness over Bruno causing the death of Stella, Bruno's girlfriend, but refuses to kill him, this being too easy. A Dobeshenko convoy arrives, with Vera as hostage. Vera was released, and Bruno walked into the woods. Dobeshenko says enemies should always be killed; Ciro shoots him, telling Dobeshenko's bodyguards there are now no bosses, with which they acquiesce.

Later, Ciro receives the severed head of Don Aniello Pastore, and a car arrives with Gennaro Savastano; he and Ciro walk toward each other.

=== Flashbacks ===
Throughout the film are flashbacks to Ciro's early life in Naples. Ciro had been rescued as a baby from the 1980 Naples earthquake in which his family had been killed. As a child he was sent to an orphanage, falling under the influence of Bruno, a small time criminal who controlled a street gang of child thieves, and collaborated with Neapolitan gangster and smuggler "Blackbird" ('"o Merlo"). Bruno, dissatisfied with his rewards from Blackbird, became enthusiastic when given a role in smuggling cigarettes. Due to his precocious talent, and affection for him, Bruno invited Ciro to watch his girlfriend, Stella sing at a club restaurant. Ciro became infatuated with her.

During a smuggling operation for Blackbird, Bruno's speedboats were chased by police, with Ciro and Bruno in one of the boats. Ciro sacrificed himself and saved the run by jumping into the water, the pursuers stopping to save him. Blackbird expressed his appreciation of Ciro, and his displeasure of Bruno who endangered his operation. On a later smuggling run, Bruno unloaded contraband for his own use in retaliation to Blackbird's slights. Realizing his mistake and a need to apologize, he sent Ciro to invite Blackbird to a meeting, at which Blackbird was ambushed, but he escapes. Later, in retaliation for the ambush, Stella was gunned down as she left a club, in front of Ciro.

Returning to Secondigliano, Ciro was met by Attilio, who invited him to meet Don Pietro Savastano.

== Cast ==
- Marco D'Amore as Ciro Di Marzio
- Salvatore D'Onofrio as Bruno
- Giuseppe Aiello as young Ciro Di Marzio
- Giovanni Vastarella as young Bruno
- Marianna Robustelli as Vera
- Martina Attanasio as Stella
- Gennaro Di Colandrea as Virgilio
- Nello Mascia as Don Aniello Pastore
- Aleksey Guskov as Yuri Dobeshenko
- Salvatore Esposito as Gennaro "Genny" Savastano

== Production ==
=== Development ===
Throughout the filming of Gomorrah, while working on his character Ciro Di Marzio, Marco D'Amore repeatedly thought about writing a story about the childhood of Ciro. After writing enough material, he thought that there could be a screenplay for a cross-media project between cinema and TV.

=== Filming ===
Filming started on 5 May 2019. Filming began in Rome on 17 May, continuing in Naples, mainly in the northern area of Naples, reconstructing a Naples set in the 1980s and Riga, Latvia. Filming then ended on 13 July 2019.

== Reception ==
In the opening weekend, The Immortal was the most watched film in Italy, with box office receipts of €2,816,155; the film grossed a total of €6 million.

The film received a positive review from Rosa Maiuccaro of Wired, who stated that "L'immortale is not recycled Gomorrah, but an important new chapter in the saga".
