= Marco D'Amore =

Italian actor and director

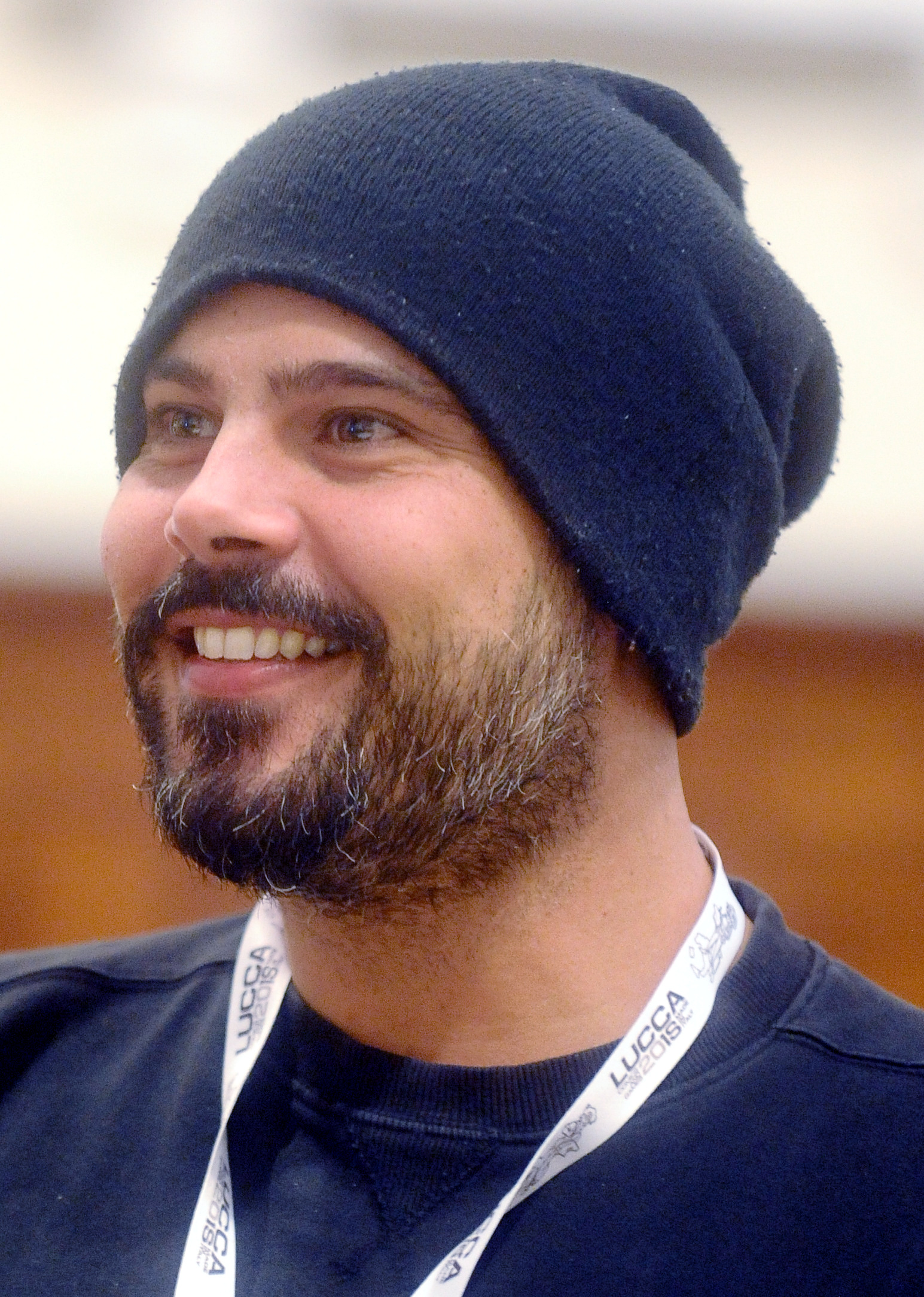
- D'Amore in 2018
- Born: 12 June 1981 (age 45); Caserta, Italy
- Occupation: Actor • film director • screenwriter
- Years active: 2009–present

Marco D'Amore (Italian pronunciation: [ˈmarko daˈmoːre]; born 12 June 1981) is an Italian actor, film director, and screenwriter, best known for his role as Ciro Di Marzio in the television series Gomorrah and the film The Immortal (2019).

== Biography ==
In 2000, D'Amore was cast in the play "The adventure of Pinocchio," produced by the theatre company of Toni Servillo.

D’Amore graduated from the Scuola d'arte drammatica Paolo Grassi in 2004 and starred in Carlo Goldoni's play "La trilogia della villeggiatura," with Toni Servillo.

In 2005, he decided to found a theatre company "La Piccola Società" that produced many plays and a short film. In 2010, D'Amore was cast, again alongside Toni Servillo, in the film A Quiet Life, and also in Love is All You Need (2011) and Perez. (2011).

In 2014, he was cast as Ciro Di Marzio in the television crime drama Gomorrah. In 2019, he directed The Immortal, both a prequel and a sequel to the events after the third season of the TV series Gomorrah.

== Filmography ==
=== Film ===
Year	Title	Role	Notes
2009	Bets and Wedding Dresses		
2010	A Quiet Life	Diego	
2012	Love Is All You Need	Marco	
2014	Perez.	Francesco Corvino	
2015	Alaska	Toni	
2015	Un posto sicuro	Luca	Also screenwriter
2016	Ugly Nasty People	Il Merda (Giorgio Armani)	
2018	Drive Me Home	Agostino	
2019	Le metamorfosi	Ovid (voice)	
2019	Dolcissime	-	Screenwriter
2019	The Immortal	Ciro Di Marzio	Also director and screenwriter
2021	Security	Roberto Santini	
2022	Napoli magica	Himself	Documentary, also director and screenwriter

=== Television ===
Year	Title	Role	Notes
2012–2013	Benvenuti a tavola	Vincenzo Caciotti	4 episodes
2014–2017, 2021	Gomorrah	Ciro Di Marzio	Main role; 46 episodes. Also director; 8 episodes
2026	Gomorrah: The Origins		Director; 4 episodes. Also co-writer
