= Fortunato Cerlino =

Italian actor (born 1971)

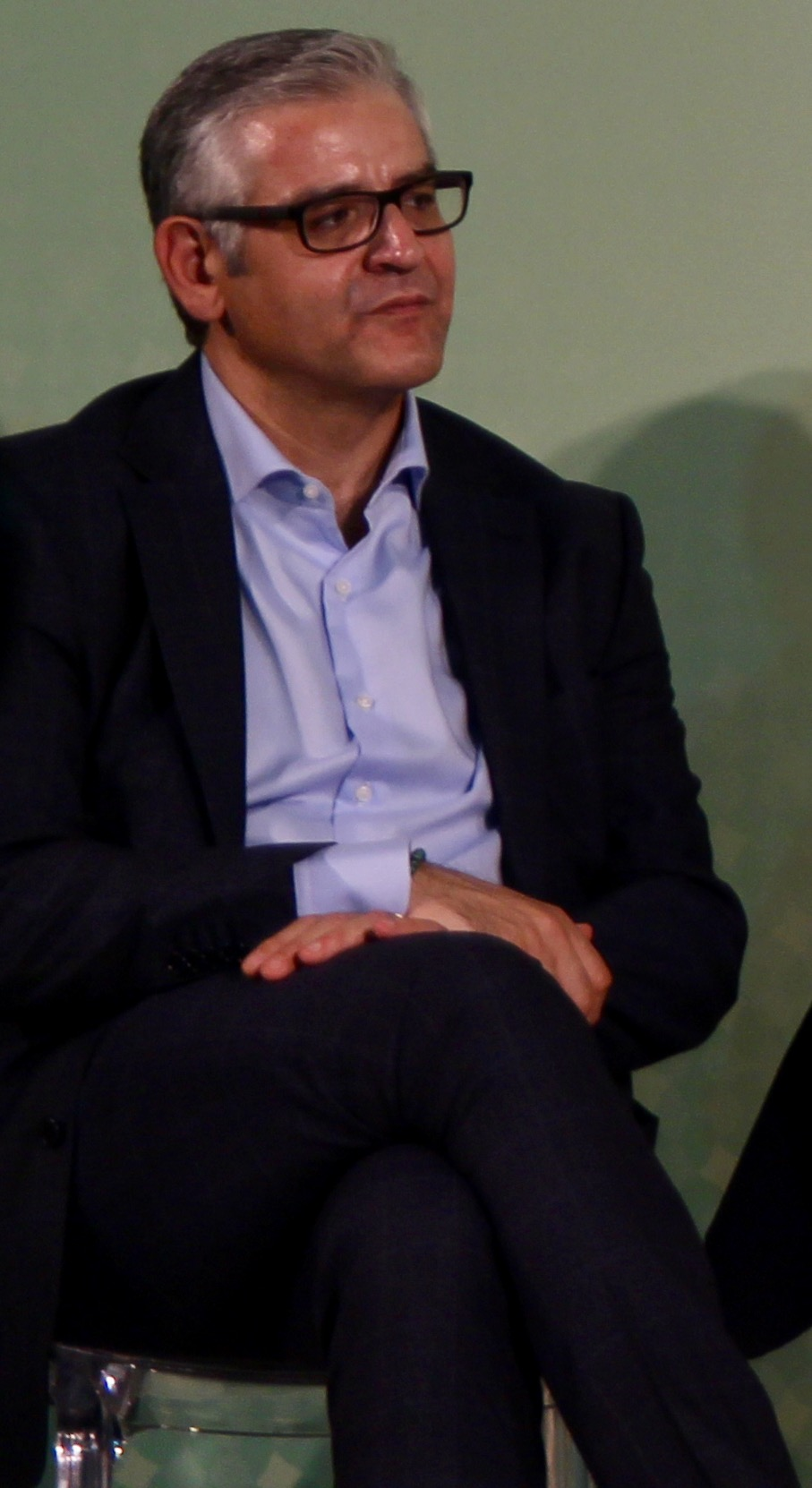
- Portrait of Fortunato Cerlino
- Born: 17 June 1971 (age 54); Naples, Italy
- Occupation: Actor
- Years active: 1999–present

Fortunato Cerlino (born 17 June 1971) is an Italian actor. He has appeared in a number of TV series in both Italy and the United States since 1999.

== Selected filmography ==
=== Film ===
Year	Title	Role	Notes
2008	Gomorrah	Farmer's Son	
2009	Fort Apache Napoli	City Councilor	
2013	Sodoma: The Dark Side of Gomorrah		
2016	Inferno	Entrance Museum Guard	
2017	A Family	Dr. Minerva	
2017	Addio fottuti musi verdi	Pietro Felacone	
2022	Lamborghini: The Man Behind the Legend	Antonio Lamborghini	
2023	The Palace	Tonino	
2025	Den of Thieves 2: Pantera	Zamba	
TBA	In the Hand of Dante	TBA	Filming

=== Television ===
Year	Title	Role	Notes
2014–2016	Gomorrah	Don Pietro Savastano	25 episodes
2015	Hannibal	Rinaldo Pazzi	4 episodes
2017	Medici: Masters of Florence	Mastro Bredani	3 episodes
2018	Britannia	Vespasian	9 episodes
2018–2022	Carlo & Malik	Mario Muzo	26 episodes
2022–	Di4ries	Paolo Agresti	15 episodes
