= Pasquale Scotti =

Italian murderer

- Photofit of Pasquale Scotti on the basis of a mug-shot from the 1980s issued in October 2011 in relation to an international arrest warrant.
- Born: 8 September 1958 (age 68); Casoria, Campania, Italy
- Height: 1.75 m (5 ft 9 in)

Pasquale Scotti (Italian pronunciation: [paˈskwaːle ˈskɔtti]; born 8 September 1958 in Casoria) is an Italian criminal and boss of the Camorra—a Mafia-type organisation in Naples and Campania—involved in the Nuova Camorra Organizzata (NCO), headed by Raffaele Cutolo.

== Camorra boss ==
He was described as a smooth and ruthless personality and one of the most able of the lieutenants of Cutolo together with Vincenzo Casillo. Scotti and Casillo—who had close ties to the secret services—mediated between Cutolo and the regional leaders of the Christian Democrat party (Italian: Democrazia Cristiana, DC), the military secret service and the Red Brigades to obtain the release of the politician Ciro Cirillo, who had been kidnapped in April 1981. Scotti also administered the assets of the NCO, investing them in Italy and abroad.

Casillo was killed by a bomb in his car in January 1983, presumably to cover the secret negotiations by DC politicians to free Cirillo, contravening the official policy of the Italian government not to negotiate with so-called terrorists. Scotti was behind the killing of Casillo's mistress because she knew too much about the dealings of his erstwhile ally.

== Arrest and escape ==
After the transfer of Cutolo to the prison island Asinara and the wave of arrests against the NCO in June 1983, Scotti tried to rearrange the organisation. He was arrested on 17 December 1983 in his fiefdom Caivano, where he controlled the rackets and trafficking in drugs, smuggled cigarettes and arms. His arrest involved a shootout with the police in which Scotti was injured. During detention, fearing a vendetta from rival Camorristi, he decided to become a pentito and collaborate with the authorities, revealing different aspects of NCO. On Christmas Eve of 1984, he escaped from the hospital in Caserta, where he had been hospitalised for a wound to the hand.

== Fugitive and final arrest ==
Since 1985, he has been on the "most wanted list" of the Italian Ministry of the Interior for murder, concealment of a corpse and other crimes. On 17 January 1990 an international arrest warrant was issued against him, calling for his arrest through extradition.

In January 2005 he received a life sentence for a series of 26 murders in 1982-83 during the Camorra war between the NCO and the Nuova Famiglia. In October 2011, while Scotti had been on the run for nearly 27 years, the Italian police issued a new photofit on the basis of a mug-shot from the 1980s.

There has been speculation that Scotti is no longer alive. He either might have been killed by rival factions in the Camorra, or because he had turned state witness, or because he knew too much about the involvement of politicians and secret services in the release of the kidnapped Cirillo. According to a 'Ndrangheta boss turned state witness, Franco Pino, Scotti died in 1984. He was finally arrested by the Interpol office in Brazil and the Brazilian Federal Police in Recife (Brazil) on 26 May 2015, after about 30 years on the run and then extradited to Italy on 10 March 2016. In July the same year Pasquale Scotti became a pentito and started cooperating with Italian authorities.

== See also ==
- List of fugitives from justice who disappeared
