= Luigi Riccio =

Luigi Ginginiello Riccio (born 1957) is a former Italian Camorrista who is now a pentito. While initially a member of the Nuova Camorra Organizzata, Riccio switched sides and joined the rival Nuova Famiglia only eight months before his collaboration with the Italian Justice department in 1983. He was one of the eight major pentiti whose testimony dealt a massive blow to the NCO's organizational structure. By the time of his defection, Luigi Riccio had a reputation as one of the bloodiest and most fearsome killers in the NCO, but was also considered to be a fickle individual for his well-known propensity for switching sides.

== Biography ==
=== Early years ===
Not much is known about the early life of Luigi Riccio. The bulk of his profile comes from the tape of Riccio's confession to the instructing judge in charge of the prosecution of the Nuova Famiglia. On 6 January 1979, Riccio was officially inducted into the organization by NCO boss Raffaele Cutolo himself, with Nicola Nuzzo, a Capozona (Capo-area) and Riccio's fellow villager as his godfather. Riccio was 22 years old at the time of his induction and was immediately put in charge of a gambling house in his native village, Ponticelli. There, Riccio was soon involved in the various beatings that had to be given to gamblers who were unable to pay their gambling debts. Sometimes, the beatings gravitated towards murder, a circumstance that he would later characterize as unintentional: "They were intended as warnings and if they turned into murders, that was accidental".

=== Capozona of Ponticelli ===
When Nicola Nuzzo was arrested in 1980, Riccio had succeeded him as the Capozona of Ponticelli. He gathered under him a small but deadly group of associates which included Salvatore Imperatrice, Mario Incarnato, Carmine Argentato, his brother-in-law Vincenzo Duraccio, and Ernesto D'Alessandri. This group soon came to be known for its inclination to resolve any disputes by the authority of their firepower, and with the progress of time, its services became increasingly in demand in other areas under the NCO's control.

Riccio's resolution for killing had been tested immediately after his induction, when he was personally asked by Raffaele Cutolo to kill the wife of Ciro Nocerino, another member of the NCO. This woman had been found guilty of not having respected her husband's honor while he was in jail and sentenced to death. However, Riccio was hesitant to kill a woman, and Nocerino himself had some doubts about the harsh punishment. Eventually, he wrote to Riccio asking him not to kill his wife, but to paralyze her with a shot to the back, in order to condemn her to a wheelchair for the rest of her life.

Riccio willingly obliged, and together with Carmine Argentato promptly executed the request by shooting her in both the legs and arms while she was lying on her bed. In spite of this, Cutolo was not satisfied and ordered her death again. Meanwhile, Riccio was arrested, fell ill and was transferred to the Poggioreale's infirmary. Upon hearing of this news, Nocerino drank a mixture of ethyl alcohol, cigarette butts and ashes which made him ill and put him in the same infirmary with a 104-degree fever. There he expressed his wish to see his wife suffer a public death on Ponticelli's main square. Riccio was finally convinced to relay this request outside to his group, and Salvatore Imperatrice attended to her execution by first shooting her, then strangling her, and finally burning her to ashes.

=== More murders ===
When Riccio was finally released for the expiration period prior to the trial, he went on a murderous mission of catching up on unfinished vendettas. He started by killing a man who had slapped him. Then he shot three NF members in San Giorgio a Cremano. Finally, he killed two men who were guilty of having robbed a gambling house protected by the NCO. Riccio vividly remembered this last episode because the corpses had been buried 50 yards away from his house, but after a while he became anxious and decided to move them to the cemetery of a nearby village. He also precisely remembered the burial ground because Salvatore Imperatrice used to go now and then to urinate on the spot. This act was called "alla faccia loro" (on their face), and by doing so, he was offending their honour. In Riccio's recollection of events, he remembered that Imperatrice was always the fall guy.

For instance, Imperatrice once killed a common acquaintance because, while he was kissing Riccio on the cheek, his hand slipped into the pocket where the latter kept his gun. Imperatrice interpreted this act as an attempt to disarm Riccio. He then fired a round of bullets into the man's body. As a result of these murders, Riccio was able to gather substantial power, and the organization slowly came to depend on him for all the violent actions in the Neapolitan hinterland. Riccio was invested with the authority to decide murders, administer beatings, and other violence-related business.

As a branch manager in the NCO, he showed himself competent at handling troublesome subordinates by using an innovative style of approach rarely found in the traditional Camorra underworld. For instance, when Antonio Caldarelli aka 'o Malommo (The Bad Man), refused to promptly execute Riccio's orders, he was sentenced to one month of suspension from the NCO's payroll, a practice found more among Italian soccer players than gangsters.

=== Downfall ===
Ironically, it would be one of these independent decisions that would cause Riccio's downfall. In 1982, Ciro Fiorentino, one of Riccio's personal godsons, became the lover of crew member Pasquale Damiano's widow only a few weeks after his murder. Riccio who was serving a minor sentence in prison at the time, decided to have Fiorentino killed without consulting Cutolo, and asked Carmine Argentato to perform the hit. When knowledge of the murder became public, Riccio was summoned to Cutolo's cell, where both Cutolo and Pasquale D'Amico strongly objected to the murder.

For Cutolo, the new relationship was acceptable since Fiorentino had belonged to the organization and he harshly scolded Riccio. Insulted by Cutolo's harsh words, Riccio put up a counterargument: "If you die and I become the lover of your girlfriend, what would you think of it?" This was seen as a multiple insult. Cutolo was highly superstitious and took offence at the discussion of his death as well as the eventual betrayal of his memory. He reacted by angrily leaving the room and slamming the door behind him.

Aware of the symbolic power of social actions in the prison system, Riccio interpreted this as a death sentence. When he was eventually released from prison, Riccio sensed that he was no longer safe within the NCO and he asked for the protection of the Nuova Famiglia in exchange for his skills as a killer. He subsequently became affiliated with the Giuliano clan from Naples' quarter Forcella, and was allowed to continue operating his business for months.

=== Becoming a Pentito ===
When he was arrested again in 1983, Riccio suffered a nervous breakdown. In late 1983, after the death of his wife, which left him with a baby daughter to look after, Luigi Riccio decided to collaborate with the Italian Justice system and became a pentito. He would later go on to testify against the NCO in the three-year-long Maxi Trial which began in 1983. He would also testify against the members of the NF during the Maxi Trials, which resulted from that organization's crackdown in 1984.

The event of Riccio's cooperation was followed by that of his one-time close friend, Salvatore Imperatrice. However, Imperatrice's testimony was considered untrustworthy. At various times, he confessed to some crimes only to change his mind and withdraw all accusations. At other times, he simply refused to testify. Imperatrice eventually had a severe psychological breakdown and was hospitalized in an asylum. There, he committed suicide in March 1989, leaving a legacy of unresolved and tainted accusations.
