= Rosetta Cutolo =

Italian female criminal (1937–2023)

- Born: 1 January 1937; Ottaviano, Italy
- Died: 14 October 2023 (aged 86); Ottaviano, Italy
- Other name: Uocchie 'e gghiaccio
- Relatives: Raffaele Cutolo (brother)
- Allegiance: Nuova Camorra Organizzata
- Criminal charges: Mafia association
- Penalty: Nine years imprisonment reduced to five years (1990)

Rosetta Cutolo (Italian pronunciation: [roˈzetta ˈkuːtolo]; 1 January 1937 – 14 October 2023) was an Italian criminal and the sister of the Camorra boss Raffaele Cutolo, head of the Nuova Camorra Organizzata (NCO), an organisation he built to renew the Camorra. As her brother spent most of his time behind bars from where he sent out his instructions, the everyday running of the enterprise was entrusted to his older sister, Rosetta. Her nickname was Uocchie 'e gghiaccio, meaning "ice eyes".

== Background ==
Rosetta, a grey-haired, pious-looking woman, lived alone for years with her mother in Ottaviano, near Naples, tending her roses. She was the power behind her brother for over 15 years, passing on his orders from jail and cultivating his devoted followers outside. Without her the NCO would have collapsed, according to a resident from Ottaviano.

While her megalomaniacal brother created scandal by giving interviews and making speeches in the courtroom, Rosetta kept a low profile. She had a love-hate relationship with her brother. According to their lawyer Paolo Trofino, they had a stormy relationship: "They often have rows. She thinks he talks too much. She wishes he wouldn’t give interviews." She ruled in the headquarters of the NCO: the Castello Mediceo, a vast 16th-century palace with 365 rooms and a large park with tennis courts and swimming pool. The castle was bought for several billion lire at the time and provided direct contact for Cutolo from the prisons of Poggioreale and Ascoli Piceno.

== Fugitive ==
Rosetta Cutolo negotiated with South American cocaine barons, narrowly failed to blow up police headquarters, and was glamourized in a film, The Professor. She participated in a high-level meeting with representatives of the Sicilian Mafia and Camorra clans to try to put an end to the war between the NCO and their rivals from the Nuova Famiglia, together with Cutolo's right-hand man Vincenzo Casillo.

In October 1981, police raided her stronghold while she was presiding over a meeting of the NCO. Cutolo escaped under a rug in a car driven past checkpoints by the neighbourhood priest. She was not seen in public thereafter for over 10 years, and directed operations from a series of safe houses in different cities.

== Arrest ==
In February 1993, she gave herself up after police found her hideout. Cutolo appeared at the entrance, saying "I am tired of being a fugitive". She had been sentenced in absentia in 1990 to nine years in prison on charges of Mafia association, later reduced to five years. Prosecutors alleged she had been running her brother's organisation. She was acquitted on nine murder charges. Rosetta had persuaded the authorities she was harmless, and her frumpy image definitely helped.

Her brother Raffaele Cutolo always maintained that Rosetta knew nothing of his criminal activities and did only what he asked: "Rosetta has never been a Camorrista... She only listened to me and sent me a few suitcases of money to prisoners like I told her to". Nevertheless, it is clear that Cutolo had always wanted to maintain a male-only organization based on principles such as criminal fraternity, and so he could never be seen giving a role to his sister. It could also be argued that he simply did not want to implicate her and therefore, always insisted that she was innocent.

== Role in NCO ==
Many important members did not believe that she held an important role because she was a woman. For instance, former NCO lieutenant and pentito Pasquale Barra argued: "What has Rosa Cutolo got to do with it? What have woman got to do with the Camorra?".

However, according to prosecutor Antonio Laudati, who questioned Cutolo many times, his sister was the true force behind the NCO: "Her brother has always been under the power of her forceful personality. He's been in prison for 30 years; during that time she became director of the Nuova Camorra Organizzata in her own right."

== Death ==
Rosetta Cutolo died on 14 October 2023, at the age of 86.
