= Giuseppe Puca =

Italian Camorrista

Pasquale Puca
- Born: June 1, 1955; Sant'Antimo, Italy
- Died: February 7, 1989 (aged 33); Sant'Antimo, Italy
- Cause of death: Shot
- Other name: 'o Giappone
- Status: Deceased
- Allegiance: Puca clan / Camorra

Giuseppe Puca (Italian pronunciation: [dʒuˈzɛppe ˈpuːka]; June 1, 1955 − February 7, 1989) was an Italian Camorrista, and the right hand of Raffaele Cutolo, boss of the Nuova Camorra Organizzata (NCO). He was known among criminal circles as 'o Giappone ("the Japan[ese]"), due to his Japanese looks.

== Background ==
During his youth, Puca showed a talent that did not pass unnoticed by Cutolo, who recruited him as among the NCO's first members in the Poggioreale prison. The others were Antonino Cuomo a.k.a. 'o Maranghiello ("the Cudgel"), Pasquale Barra a.k.a. 'o Nimale ("the Animal"), Pasquale D'Amico a.k.a. 'o Cartunaro ("the Cardboard picker") and Vincenzo Casillo a.k.a. 'o Nirone ("the Big Black one").

Thus, began his ascent to success. He soon became the capozona of Sant'Antimo. He was suspected and accused of several murders, the principal or not, extortion and Camorra association. He was also suspected of having Cutolo escape criminal from mental hospital of Aversa, making the jump to the wall of dynamite. Puca was a primary suspect in the murder of Vincenzo Casillo, Cutolo's deputy and main 'military' chief at the order of Cutolo himself. This accusation, however, has never been confirmed nor proven. After Casillo's death, Puca replaced him as Cutolo's new second-in-command, but was later arrested and brought to trial in the famous 1983 maxi-trials against the NCO.

He was involved in the "Tortora case", after the famous TV talk show host Enzo Tortora who was arrested in May 1983 and wrongly sentenced to ten years imprisonment for association with the mafia to corrupt the press. In September 1986, the Corte d'Assise of Naples fully acquitted Enzo Tortora. In 1987 the Supreme Court definitively affirmed Enzo Tortora's total innocence, and he started an action against those magistrates who had unjustly tried and sentenced him. Tortora's name allegedly appeared in the agenda of Puca, however in reality it was a certain Tortona, not Tortora.

Puca was murdered on February 7, 1989, after a long shoot out with members of the Verde clan in Sant'Antimo.
