= Pasquale D'Amico =

Italian criminal

Pasquale D'Amico (Italian pronunciation: [paˈskwaːle daˈmiːko]) is a former Italian Camorrista who was a senior member of the Nuova Camorra Organizzata (NCO), a Camorra organization in Naples. His nickname was 'o Cartunaro ("the Cardboard picker"). D'Amico defected from the NCO and subsequently became a pentito in 1983. Among the pentiti, D'Amico was one of the highest-ranking due to his position within the NCO. He was the first high-ranking NCO informant to reveal Neapolitan crime boss, Raffaele Cutolo links with the Calabrian 'Ndrangheta.

== Biography ==
=== Position within the NCO ===
D'Amico was one of the earliest members of the NCO, ever since its inception in Cutolo's hometown of Ottaviano on October 24, 1970. He was a santista, i.e., a member of the NCO executive board. He had the power to incorporate new members into the organization, and the autonomy to make important decisions, from the commission of killings to the exploration of new economical ventures. After he was arrested in the early 1980s, he was transferred to Naples' Poggioreale prison where he became the roommate of Raffaele Cutolo. This factor made him the messenger for Cutolo's orders, and was instrumental in propelling him to the top management of the NCO hierarchy.

For instance, when on April 13, 1981, Raffaella Esposito, a ten-year-old girl from Somma Vesuviana, a small village in the proximity of Ottaviano was kidnapped, D'Amico warned the kidnappers during an appearance in the courtroom: "Leave her free, or the NCO will kill you.". The media reported this warning after the Italian police, who had arrested Giovanni Castiello, a 37-year-old factory worker on kidnapping charges, had to release him for lack of evidence. A few months later, the body of Raffaella Esposito was found in a ravine of her village. When word of this spread around, the NCO took upon itself the task to avenge the little girl's murder. Castiello was ambushed and shot dead in the streets of his village. In a telephone call to the Italian press agency ANSA, the NCO proclaimed that Castiello had been found guilty of the kidnapping and had been giustiziato (executed). The tone was eerily similar to that of political terrorist groups in Italy.

=== Escape from prison and recapture ===
In the summer of 1981, D'Amico escaped from prison and joined the executive board of the NCO branch outside prison, which was called Cielo Coperto (cloudy sky). He worked closely with Vincenzo Casillo, then second-in-command to Cutolo, and he accumulated a wealth of information on the different operations which were managed by the NCO. D'Amico was again arrested at the end of 1981. This time, during a raid on his apartment, police found very sensitive materials on him including a copy of the ritual of initiation, an agenda full of names, letters, money orders receipts, etc., which confirmed the Justice Department's suspicion of his role as a leader. Due to Cutolo's ability to command respect from the penitentiary direction, which until 1982 usually promptly consented to all his requests, D'Amico was sent to the prison on Ascoli Piceno where he joined the leadership of the NCO.

=== Becoming a Pentito ===
According to his later confession to the Justice Department, D'Amico began having his first doubts about the NCO after the murder of Antonio Di Matteo, an NCO member who was planning on switching sides to the rival Camorra clan, Nuova Famiglia. Di Matteo was murdered together with his mother, sister and sister-in-law. After this episode, D'Amico wrote a letter to the Neapolitan daily Il Mattino where he expressed his repugnance for the murders of so many innocent victims. However, this letter was read by a warden on the NCO's payroll who advised D'Amico to destroy it, in order to avoid trouble with the leadership at Ascoli Piceno. D'Amico then backed down claiming to have written the letter in a moment of rage.

Also, when Cutolo's influence deteriorated in 1982 and he was relocated to a prison on the island Asinara at the insistence of then Italian president Sandro Pertini, D'Amico began having serious doubts as to the NCO's ability to compete successfully against the NF and the Italian Justice Department. Finally, in the summer of 1983, one of his godsons, Nicola Mazzo, aka "'o Carusiello" ("The Cabman") showed him a letter by Cutolo in which Cutolo claimed that he was willing to sacrifice seven of his best men, among them D'Amico, in exchange for a peace treaty with the NF. Astounded by this high level of treachery that was being perpetrated by Cutolo, D'Amico decided to collaborate with Italian Justice on September 27, 1983.

D'Amico's cooperation which came one year later than that of Pasquale Barra, was viewed by the Justice department as extremely valuable because it enabled the Department to cover the latest period of the NCO's activities, especially its response to the 1983 crackdown by the Italian government. D'Amico would testify against Cutolo and numerous NCO members during the three-year-long Maxi Trials. His testimony along with those of Giovanni Pandico, Pasquale Barra, Mario Incarnato, etc. were found reliable and convincing enough to become a significant factor in the convictions of more than 800 defendants. However, many of the pentiti's allegations were proved to be fabrications and several of the convicted defendants were released.
