= Vollaro clan =

Camora clan in Portici and San Sebatiano al Vesuvio

- Luigi Vollaro behind bars during his 1982 trial.
- Founded: 1970s
- Founded by: Luigi Vollaro
- Founding location: Portici, Naples
- Years active: 1970s-present
- Territory: Portici and the southeast of the Metropolitan City of Naples
- Ethnicity: Campanian
- Criminal activities: Racketeering, cigarette smuggling, drug trafficking, loan sharking, prostitution, counterfeiting, extortion, murder, waste management, gambling and fraud
- Allies: Ascione clan Abate clan (defunct); Giuliano clan (defunct); Anastasio clan Veneruso clan Marfella clan
- Rivals: Mazzarella clan Birra clan Cozzolino clan

The Vollaro clan is a Neapolitan Camorra clan operating in the area east of Naples, more specifically in the town of Portici and San Sebastiano al Vesuvio, a small village in the Vesuvius area.

== History ==
The Vollaro clan was founded in the mid-seventies by Luigi Vollaro nicknamed "'o Califfo" (The Caliph) for his alleged unlimited sexual potency. When he eventually was arrested in 1982, the police found that Vollaro was living in a concubinage with 17 women and had 27 children. When asked by the judge whether he belonged to the Camorra, he replied: "What is the Camorra? A criminal organization, they say. I belong only to my family. I mate only with my women."

The Vollaro clan has fought two Cammora wars. The first between 1977 and 1997, was an internal war plagued by a score of murders and the other, in late 2001 and early 2002, was with the Cozzilino clan.

The Vollaro clan was one of the first clans to take sides with the powerful Alfieri clan from Piazzolla di Nola, led by Carmine Alfieri against the Nuova Camorra Organizzata (NCO) which was led by Raffaele Cutolo. It was also one of the first clans to join the Nuova Famiglia (NF), a coalition of anti-Cutolo clans which was formed to contrast the growing power of the NCO.

In 1982, Luigi Vollaro was arrested after spending three years on the run and was charged with the murder of Giuseppe Mutillo in 1980. Vollaro was later sentenced to life imprisonment for this murder. In 2003, Vollaro received a second life sentence for the murder of Carlo Lardone.

In 1992, Vollaro was subjected to the harsh Article 41-bis prison regime, thus having the distinction of being one of the first Camorra bosses to be subjected to this regime. For a short period after his arrest, the management of his illegal businesses went to his sons Pietro, Giuseppe and Raffaele. Another son, Antonio who had dissociated from the family business early on, was wrongly detained years for a murder committed by his brother Ciro. Ciro admitted to the murder after becoming a pentito (collaborator with Italian Justice) and with his confessions, dealt a massive blow to the clan's activities.

Five sons of the "Caliph" were arrested on June 10, 2009, including the regent of the clan, Antonio Vollaro. The investigation leading to the arrests showed that nearly the entire town of Portici paid extortion money (the pizzo) to the clan, from the shops in the center to ambulant street sellers. The more affluent shops in the center of town had to pay between 500 and 2,000 euros a month, while the street sellers had to pay 30-40 euro a week. At Christmas, Easter and the holiday season extras had to be paid.

The continuing arrests of the Vollaro clan's members is likely to break the balance of local organized crime. Its weakening is likely to pave the way for the more powerful Sarno clan.

=== Current status ===
As of 2019, despite the weakening compared to the years when the clan was dominant in the southeast of Naples, it remains active, in particular in Portici, the clan's original stronghold.

Despite being in prison, Pietro Vollaro, son of Luigi, is considered by the authorities the current leader of the organization.

After the murder of Ciro D'Anna, affiliate of the clan, on December 23, 2019, news emerged that the Vollaro clan would be at war with the Mazzarella clan, due to the interests of the latter in expanding their territories into the Vollaro's zone of influence. Ciro D'Anna was reportedly one of the right-hand men of Carlo Vollaro, who is now considered one of the leaders of the organization.

== Capoclan (official and acting) ==
- 1970s-2015 — Luigi "o' Califfo" Vollaro — arrested and sentenced for life in 1982. (Died in prison on December 3, 2015)
  - Acting 1996-1996 — Ruling panel: Giuseppe and Raffaele Vollaro — the two members were arrested.
  - Acting 1996-2009 — Antonio Vollaro — imprisoned.
- 2015–present — Pietro Vollaro — in jail.
  - Acting 2015–present — Unknown

== Informant and witness ==
- 1996 — Ciro Vollaro — son of Luigi, cocaine addict, deceased in 2006 for suicide.
- 1996 — Francesco Di Pierno — Luigi's capozona.
- 1996 — Francesco Pariota — Another Luigi's capozona.
