= Pasquale Galasso =

Former member of the Camorra

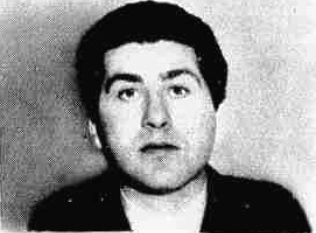
- Born: May 17, 1955; Poggiomarino, Campania, Italy
- Known for: High ranking member of the Nuova Famiglia (formerly)
- Allegiance: Camorra (formerly)

Pasquale Galasso (Poggiomarino, May 17, 1955) is a former boss of the Galasso clan, a clan of the Camorra, the Neapolitan crime organization. Since August 1992, he has been a pentito (a criminal turned state witnesses), collaborating with the Italian justice. He revealed many intricate secrets about the Camorra. This led to revelations from other pentiti allowing an insight into the Camorra from the insider's point of view.

== Early life and criminal career ==
Galasso was born in Poggiomarino, near Naples. Belonging to a well-endowed family – he studied medicine – he entered criminality when he killed two Camorristi who were trying to kidnap his brother (or asking him the pizzo). Once imprisoned at Poggioreale prision, he became acquainted with numerous Camorristi and knew Raffaele Cutolo.

He joined the Nuova Famiglia clan in the early 1980s and was soon protagonist of the bombing of Vincenzo Casillo, collaborator of Cutolo, the Nuova Famiglia's main rival. This murder is considered the beginning of the decline of Cutolo's Nuova Camorra Organizzata. During the war against the latter Galasso lost one brother.

Galasso's girlfriend was Florinda Mirabile, the daughter of Mario Mirabile, a Camorra clan boss. After her father's murder, she asked Galasso for help obtaining a gun to avenge the murder. He procured a precision shotgun for her, but the vendetta was never carried out. She would eventually turn state witness against the 'Ndrangheta in 1995, and receive a light sentence in return.

== Arrest and turning state witness ==
In 1992, he was arrested and, after a short period, became a pentito. Galasso confessed to over twenty murders and revealed the whereabouts of where the victims were buried. His revelations shocked Italy, when he mentioned high level members of Christian Democrat Party (then Italy's most important party) having links with the Camorra, such as the former Interior Minister Antonio Gava.

According to Galasso, the Camorra and politics were not separate worlds. Each Camorra clan had a 'prime political sponsor' and in common agreement politicians and criminal bosses would decide who should be elected to the principal political positions, who should obtain public contracts and which sites should be earmarked for construction.

While testifying about the links between the Camorra and DC, Galasso said that following the election of the town council of Poggiomarino, he was asked to intervene with a local councillor to persuade him with all the weight of his "Camorra fame" to ally himself with Antonio Gava who had promised him the position of mayor. Galasso's reticence was soon overcome by the direct intervention of his boss, Carmine Alfieri. "He assured me that Gava was on our side and that I couldn't deny him that favour", Galasso said. The politician was then persuaded to side with Gava, even though he disliked him. Galasso further continued, "For the duration of that government, I was the tongue convincing the one, who didn't want to renounce his position as mayor, and the other, who wanted to occupy it, to remain united."

His villa in the town of Scafati is now home to a barracks of the Guardia di Finanza. A biography has been written on Galasso's life entitled "Io, Pasquale Galasso: da studente in medicina a capocamorra" by Gigi Di Fiore, edited by T. Pironti, Naples, in 1994.

== Legacy ==
According to historian Tom Behan, "Pasquale Galasso's revelations are probably more important for understanding the Camorra than Tommaso Buscetta's have been in terms of understanding the Mafia. When Buscetta decided to cooperate with the authorities, he had been living abroad for several years, away from the nerve centres of power. Galasso had been in the eye of the storm until his arrest, and had arguably played a more important role within the Camorra than Buscetta had within the Mafia."
