= Giovanni Pandico =

Italian Camorrista (born 1944)

Giovanni Pandico (born June 24, 1944) is a former Italian Camorrista who was a member of the Nuova Camorra Organizzata (NCO), a Camorra organization in Naples. Pandico rose to become one of Camorra boss, Raffaele Cutolo's underwriters within the organization. After twelve years of imprisonment, he decided to collaborate with Italian justice and subsequently became a pentito in 1983. Pandico's revelations brought a massive crackdown on the NCO and led to the arrests of over 856 NCO members and affiliates on June 17, 1983, a day labeled by the Neapolitan press as the black day of the NCO.

== Biography ==
=== Early years ===
Giovanni Pandico was born in Liveri (Naples), where his father was a lieutenant in the Italian army. Leaving Sassari shortly after the Second World War, his mother brought him to Liveri, a small town on the outskirts of Naples where his Greek grandfather had first taken up residence. During one of his first days on the witness stand, Pandico commented on his Greek roots: "My family has Greek origins and in Greek, Pandicos means the just man." By the age of 15, Pandico was already familiar with juvenile hall, having spent some years inside the Filangieri, the Neapolitan juvenile detention centre. At the age of 19, he was arrested for attempting to bomb the barracks of the Carabinieri and thus incarcerated in the infamous Poggioreale prison of Naples.

It was during this period that he met prominent Camorrista and head of the NCO, Raffaele Cutolo. According to his later testimony in the courtroom, Pandico was initiated into the Camorra by Cutolo on December 8, 1963, by the classical ritual of blood baptism: a small cut on the base of the index finger of the right hand. Later, in a letter to Cutolo, he would recall the event as "our first camorristic dawn with all our splendor".

Pandico was eventually acquitted of the bombing charges and released from prison. While living in freedom, he survived on odd, low paying jobs and was occasionally sent back to the Poggioreale prison for minor offenses. During one of his prison terms, he was reunited with Giorgio Della Pietra, another native of Liveri, who was serving a 24-year prison term for murder. It was during his stay with Della Pietra that Pandico came to the conclusion that it was his own father and mother, together with the mayor of Liveri, Nicola Nappi and his brother Salvatore, who had conspired to have Della Pietra convicted of the murder of another brother of the mayor, Michele Nappi, on April 3, 1956.

=== Assassination attempt on Mayor Nicola Nappi ===
Pandico was inclined by this piece of information to seek revenge on the people responsible for his friend's incarceration. On June 18, 1970, two days after his release from prison, he went to city hall with the intention to kill the mayor, Nicola Nappi. In his rampage through the corridors of the city hall, he first killed Giuseppe Gaetano, a city supervisor who tried to block him. He then proceeded to shoot and kill Guido Adrianopoli, a clerk who had appeared in the corridor to see what was going on. Finally, he shot and wounded the mayor and employee, Pasquale Scola, who were both trying to find some protection in the mayor's desk.

Pandico was arrested the following day and immediately confessed to the crime. He stated that he wanted to get even with the mayor, the mayor's brother Salvatore, and his own mother and father who had testified in the criminal trial against his friend, Giorgio Della Pietra. But he later changed his mind and declared that Mayor Nappi had put a contract on Giuseppe Gaetano. He claimed that Gaetano was blackmailing the mayor and that Nappi arranged to be wounded in order to confuse the reconstruction of the crime and so distance himself from the murder. After a brief psychiatric examination which had cleared Pandico to stand trial, he was defined as a "pure paranoid individual, able however to understand very well his own situation". As a result, he was convicted of multiple murder, multiple attempted murder and lying with malice by the judges of the Corte d'Assise in Naples, and sentenced to 30 years of imprisonment, in total. He had been sentenced to three years of imprisonment for a slander charge in 1973.

=== Career in the NCO ===
In prison, Pandico increased his knowledge by voraciously reading written documents, particularly legal papers, and soon began helping other inmates in their dealing with the law. Thus, he soon developed a prodigious career in the mostly illiterate Neapolitan prison system. He was soon transferred to the prison of Porto Azzurro, where he was hired by the prison administration to help other inmates write personal letters, appeals to judges and other bureaucratic letters. Later, he was again transferred to the prison of Ascoli Piceno, which was a traditional stronghold of Raffaele Cutolo's NCO. He was moved to a cell next to Cutolo and assisted the crime boss in his daily routine, which included making coffee for him, serving food, but above all, he wrote letters on Cutolo's behalf, using a stamp with Cutolo's signature.

Pandico's new status of scrivano ("writer") coupled with his close contact and relationship with the boss greatly boosted his prestige and standing within the organization. He had now gained a reputation as a "man of honor". However, Pandico was increasingly at odds with the younger, more determined members of the NCO who despised him due to his arrogance and his desire to always know everything. It was only Cutolo's vested interest in Pandico that prevented any violence against him.

=== Becoming a pentito ===
However, things would later change dramatically for Giovanni Pandico when, following the scandal of the Cirillo affair, President Sandro Pertini personally intervened to have Cutolo transferred to the high security prison on the island of Asinara, Sardinia. Pandico realized that the younger leaders of the organization would never give him the respect that he wanted. After attempting unsuccessfully to improve his position by meeting with the NCO leadership, he asked the prison administration to put him in isolation. Two days later, on March 21, 1983, Pandico summoned the warden and announced his desire to defect from the NCO and cooperate with the authorities. Pandico also claimed to be a godfather and senior figure in the NCO.

Giovanni Pandico's decision to become a pentito was received as a big surprise by the Italian law enforcement agencies. This was because although he had spent the past twelve years in prison, he had never come under suspiscion as being a member of the NCO. Pandico soon proved to be one of the most important pentiti to ever be involved in the Maxi Trial against the NCO. He was the second senior member of the NCO to turn informant, the first being Pasquale Barra, who realizing that Cutolo was prepared to let him be killed, decided to reveal details of NCO murders in order to gain greater protection. A week after announcing his decision, he was flown via helicopter to the Neapolitan Operative Center of the Carabinieri, where his visit was eagerly awaited by the prosecuting attorneys, Lucio Di Pietro and Felice Di Persia.

In his confession to the two district attorneys, Pandico presented himself as the betrayed man and expressed his disillusion in the organization:

"I intend to tell everything I know about the organization called NCO which I belonged and from which I want to dissociate myself because the rules of honor which had characterized the NCO up to now, no longer exist. A once perfect organization in which I believed, with a division of rules and hierarchies that are always respected, is now under the arbitrary will of different people who do not rely on the leaders of the organization and due to a lack of discipline go against the common interest of the organization, producing an unnecessary amount of violence and terror. I thought a great deal about it, and I have decided to talk. I want to do so in full spontaneity, having realized the uselessness of belonging to an organization devoid of all rules."

By this time, Pandico also held his former boss and mentor, Raffaele Cutolo, responsible for his problems and the general situation. In an open letter to Cutolo which was published in a Naples daily paper, he said: "When you will be left alone, when all the camorristic people will have deserted you, you will take off your mask. Maybe only to breathe some fresh air. Otherwise you will end up choked by all these dead men who will scream at you: for what we have died?".

After more than a week of interrogation and 300 pages of deposition, Pandico was identified as a true pentito. His deposition was released to the press two months later on June, at the time of the crackdown against the NCO, as the most significant evidence behind the arrests of 200 individuals. Overall, more than 1,000 would later be indicted for the crime of association with a "Mafia-like organization" called "Nuova Camorra Organizzata". The resulting Maxi trials lasted three years and required the participation of nine different judges and scores of legal clerks, attorneys, witnesses and military policemen. Pandico was also sentenced to two years of imprisonment, for slander charges against prison staff, by the Tribunal of Livorno in 1984.

=== Testifying against his former colleagues ===
From April 10, 1985 to April 15, 1985, Pandico took the stand and provided an unchallenged five-day testimony against his former associates and provided evidence for the crime of association in the NCO against many defendants. After his first testimony, he had come to be perceived as the most reliable of the pentiti by both the press as well as law enforcement agencies. The Italian newspapers dubbed him "The Supercomputer", due to his extraordinary memory and were scrambling to cover the new wealth of information that he had produced in the courtroom.

On the second day of his testimony, Pandico reminisced about the actions of one of his own Camorristic godsons, Alfredo Guarnieri. Pandico testified that during this time when he and Guarnieri had shared the same cell, the latter had asked to be admitted into the NCO. Prior to an induction, an initiate had to prove his courage by executing a sgarro, a test of personal violence needed by any member to fully become a Camorrista. Pandico agreed to this initiation and asked Guarnieri to murder his own sister-in-law, whom he deemed guilty of betraying the family honor after the death of his brother. Moreover, he wanted her head cut off in an almost surgically precise way in order to create a cover up, and put on the grave of his brother.

However, Guarnieri did not possess the necessary skill for the operation. Therefore, Pandico decided to teach him how to decapitate a person by showing him how to behead rabbits. He brought a dozen rabbits from the prison's canteen and with a sharpened spoon demonstrated how to sever their heads. He gave the novice some rabbits to practise on and when he became completely certain that Guarnieri knew the proper decapitation techniques, he sent him to behead his sister-in-law. This murder was never accomplished. The judges, lawyers, and audience reacted to Pandico's story with a mixed reaction of interest, shock, horror and bemused curiosity.

Among his many other important revelations was the claim that Italian businessman, and former SISMI officer, Francesco Pazienza had met the failed Turkish assassin, Mehmet Ali Ağca, in his prison cell at Rome's Ascoli Piceno. This claim was also made by Ağca himself in his trial. From his New York prison, Pazienza denied ever having visited Ağca.

In the first set of trials resulting from the 1983 crackdown, Pandico's testimony along with those of many other pentiti such as Pasquale Barra, Giovanni Melluso and Luigi Riccio were found reliable and convincing enough to become a significant factor in the convictions of more than 800 defendants. However, many of Pandico's accusations were later proven to be unfounded, and several of the convicted defendants were released. In a separate trial in Salerno in which Pandico was called to testify, the prosecuting magistrate stated that "Pandico's repentance was one of his many opportunities to show off his histrionic personality made up of mystifications, ample but void gestures, bickering accusations and lies."

=== False testimony against Enzo Tortora ===
Giovanni Pandico was one of the eight former NCO pentiti who falsely accused the popular TV anchorman Enzo Tortora of NCO membership and cocaine trafficking. He mentioned Tortora's name while examining the lists of the members of the NCO. He claimed to have received this information directly from Raffaele Cutolo, in the course of a discussion which was supposedly carried out in the Ascoli Piceno prison during the second half of 1981. Pandico underlined that Tortora's task within the organization was that of selling the drugs and taking the money abroad.

He claimed that Tortora was mentioned accidentally while discussing a stock of drugs, when Cutolo allegedly said: "let's not behave like Tortora", "the one with the parrot". However, Cutolo would have been referring to a misdeed committed by Tortora, that is, a stock of drugs worth 50-60 million lire which he was in debt of with the organization and especially with Barbaro and Alcamo, a stock which Tortora had supposedly sold but not paid to the NCO during the years between 1977 and 1978. Tortora was detained for years before being cleared of the charge by an appeals court. He developed cancer and died soon after the case was finally solved, some say because of the emotional stress of his imprisonment.
