= Mario Fabbrocino =

Italian crime boss (1943–2019)

- Born: 5 January 1943; Ottaviano, Italy
- Died: 23 April 2019 (aged 76); Parma, Italy
- Other names: 'O Gravunaro; Boss dei due mondi
- Occupation: Founder of the Fabbrocino clan
- Known for: Murder; drug trafficking; Mafia association
- Status: Deceased (imprisoned since 2005)
- Allegiance: Fabbrocino clan / Camorra
- Penalty: Life imprisonment

Mario Fabbrocino (Italian pronunciation: [ˈmaːrjo fabbroˈtʃiːno]; 5 January 1943 – 23 April 2019) was a powerful Italian crime boss of the Camorra – the Neapolitan mafia.

== History ==
Mario Fabbrocino was the leader of the Fabbrocino clan, based in the Vesuvius area, with its sphere of influence around Nola, Ottaviano, San Giuseppe Vesuviano, San Gennaro Vesuviano. He was nicknamed 'o gravunaro ("the charcoal burner") and boss dei due mondi ("boss of the two worlds"), due to his business in South America.

He was one of the leaders of the Nuova Famiglia, created in the 1980s to face the rising power of Raffaele Cutolo's Nuova Camorra Organizzata. The feud with Cutolo intensified when Cutolo ordered the killing of Fabbrocino's brother Francesco. Fabbrocino later avenged his brother's death by ordering the murder of Cutolo's only son, Roberto, on 19 December 1990.

On the run since 1988, he was among the most wanted fugitives of Italy for a murder in 1982. He was arrested in Buenos Aires, Argentina on 3 September 1997. After a long legal battle, he was extradited to Italy in March 2001.

He was released in July 2002 because the legal term for preventive custody had expired. However, he received an arrest warrant for cocaine trafficking and was arrested again. Fabbrocino was sentenced to 6 years and 4 months in January 2003. He was released in August 2004, due to time served (the time he had spent in jail in Argentina waiting for extradition was included).

He was sentenced to life imprisonment on 13 April 2005, for the killing of Roberto Cutolo (b. 1962; the son of Raffaele Cutolo and historical enemy of Fabbrocino) on 19 December 1990, in Tradate. He became a fugitive once more. On 15 August 2005, he was arrested again in his home in San Giuseppe Vesuviano.

== Death ==
On 23 April 2019, Fabbrocino died in the hospital of the Parma prison, where he was serving a life sentence.

On 28 April 2019, he was buried in the cemetery of Ottaviano, his native city, with a brief private ceremony after the public funeral had been denied by the State.
