= Pasquale Barra =

Italian hitman (1942–2015)

Pasquale Barra (Italian pronunciation: [paˈskwaːle ˈbarra]; 18 January 1942 – 27 February 2015) was an Italian Camorrista who was a senior member and hitman for the Nuova Camorra Organizzata (NCO), a Camorra organisation in Naples. Barra has the distinction of being the first NCO member to become a pentito, when he decided to collaborate with Italian Justice in 1982.

Barra sported numerous nicknames, both self-appointed and those given to him. The first one was 'o Studente ("the Student"), which was given to him by Cutolo during his years as a student in Ottaviano. Then there was his public nickname, 'o Nimale ("the Animal"), which was allegedly given to him by the Italian media. The third one was Alias, a self-appointed war name. He killed 67 men in jail.

== Biography ==
=== Association with the NCO ===
A native of Ottaviano, the same town near Naples where Neapolitan crime boss Raffaele Cutolo was born, Barra was the first and most devoted member of Cutolo's gang ever since they were both teenagers. At 6'3" tall, he was physically impressive with a lean and athletic build. When Cutolo set up the NCO at their hometown on 24 October 1970, Barra became his second in command and immediately took charge of reinforcing all intimidation, extortion and racketeering activities within their territory. He became a full-time killer for the organisation, favouring the use of knives and butchery tools over guns and automatic weapons to carry out his hits.

=== Relationship with Raffaele Cutolo ===
The relationship between Barra and Cutolo had always been a close one. From the very beginning, Barra had been a faithful follower of Cutolo, whom he practically revered. Moreover, being a more practical and ordinary man, he was able to muffle some of the more extreme features of Cutolo's behaviour and reveal them to the other people who would have otherwise been simply too scared to approach Cutolo. Barra was, in fact, the de facto link between Cutolo and other NCO members, bridging Cutolo's charisma with a more practical vision of life. As such, Cutolo greatly appreciated Barra's role within the organisation.

For instance, when Cutolo purchased a 16th-century castle in Ottaviano, which had previously belonged to the Medici dynasty, he had a special postcard of the castle printed with the caption "Castello Mediceo, private property of R. Cutolo and P. Barra.". His great admiration for Barra was expressed in a poem entitled "N'omme 'e Camorra" (A man of the Camorra), which was written by him for Barra's birthday.

=== Chief of Ottaviano ===
During the period between 1976 and 1983, when the NCO had total control over Ottaviano and the Neapolitan hinterland, Barra ruled this town of 200,000 inhabitants as his own personal fiefdom, ruling on every aspect of the town's activities, from illegal businesses such as prostitution, gambling and extortion to more respectable businesses. The NCO even had their own men inside the city council. When Barra's younger brother was shot in the kneecaps by a rival gang, they were able to find him a job inside City Hall, after having provided him with a governmental pension for an alleged permanent infirmity.

=== War with the Nuova Famiglia ===
Barra's arrest in 1979 did not diminish his influence inside and outside of prison. On the contrary, he established himself as the second in command of the organisational executive board inside the cielo scoperto (i.e., the prison penitentiary system). When the NCO began its long-standing war against the rival Camorra clans, particularly the newly formed Nuova Famiglia, he decided to primarily concentrate on the killing of rivals inside the prison system. It was during this time that the media started calling him "the killer of the prisons", and he acquired the nickname 'o Nimale ("the Animal"), due to the utmost cruelty and pitiless way in which he killed his enemies. His many murder convictions earned him a life sentence from the Italian court.

He pursued his newly appointed mission with a fervent religious zeal, and he became almost suicidal in his attempts to eliminate his adversaries. He never worried about getting caught. In fact, some of his letters sent to other members of the NCO attest to his thirst for blood. He once wrote to Marco Medda, an NCO board executive: "Brother, I beg you to give a kiss to our Prince (Cutolo). I am doing all I can to get transferred to Napoli to kill some of these scumbags, and I will perform one of my best dramas: they must pay, understand?".

In another letter to Cutolo's sister, Rosetta, he used even stronger words while describing his project: "My dearest comare, regarding this crawling vermin (the traitors), be confident. I will give you full satisfaction. I was so nervous that my own liver rotted because i did not have a chance yet to meet and greet these scumbags. I am telling you: be calm. I will take care of them with the help of the people who love the prince (Cutolo) for life and death."

When one of Cutolo's major enemies was arrested, Barra wrote directly to Cutolo: "My dearest compare, you have heard about the arrest of that big don. He peed in his pants because he thought that he got caught by the men of the Prince. Now tell me how these people think that they can survive, and anyway I am waiting to cross the paths of some of these conspirators, because I want to show them how much Alias is worth. Be calm, they will pay with their last drop of blood."

=== Killing rivals ===
In just a couple of years, Barra had amassed an impressive list of killings, the most famous of which were the three deadly assaults that occurred during the 1980 Irpinia earthquake. During the night of November 18, 1980, an earthquake of 6.8 on the Richter scale hit Naples and the Campania region. In the Poggioreale prison, the confusion and terror were magnified by the feeling of being entrapped. In order to avoid panic and a greater disaster, the prisoners were allowed to go to the jail courtyard presumed to be safer from collapsing buildings. However, this decision made by the prison authorities had an unintended consequence. The courtyard soon became a battlefield. Old rancors, impending vendettas and gang feuds exploded and were resolved in the bloodiest ways. Among many assassinations, Barra personally killed three rival NF members. These hits, as well as many others, greatly increased Barra's prestige and standing among the other NCO members.

=== Murder of Francis Turatello ===
However, it was another murder which would eventually lead to his downfall and subsequent defection from the NCO. On August 17, 1981, under Cutolo's orders Barra organized an ambush to kill Milanese crime boss and Cosa Nostra associate, Francis Turatello in the courtyard of Badu 'e Carros, the high security prison in Nuoro, Sardinia. Barra was assisted in the murder by three well-known assassins, Salvatore Maltese, Antonino Faro and Vincenzo Andraous. Turatello was unable to escape the ambush. Barra and Andraous held Turatello, while Faro and Maltese stabbed him sixty times. In the ensuing confusion from the attack, Andraus was also wounded and would later receive minor surgery in the prison infirmary.

Among the two Sicilian hitmen, Barra had come to know Faro well. Faro and Maltese were from Catania, Sicily. Faro was 28 years old at the time of Turatello's murder and by then, had already been convicted of five murders. Barra once wrote to Cutolo about him: "Catania, with its sons, must be hugged by the prince.". The murder resulted in the assassins being more loyal to Cutolo than to anyone else. By involving both Faro and Maltese in the murder, Barra hoped to share responsibility with the Sicilian Mafia over the murder. The rationale for this was that the Mafia would never allow a killing of which it did not approve.

=== Downfall ===
However, the two assassins were from an Eastern Sicilian family headed by Giuseppe Calderone, not involved with the ruling corporate group of the Sicilian Mafia based in Western Sicily. As a result, the whole plot backfired. Turatello had close and powerful contacts within the Sicilian Mafia. Frank Coppola, a powerful Detroit Partnership figure in Detroit, Michigan, was his godfather and Luciano Leggio, the head of the Corleonesi faction of the Sicilian Mafia had himself put Turatello in charge of all drug trade in the region of Milan.

They took Turatello's murder as an insult to their honour and reacted angrily. They held Cutolo responsible for the murder and threatened to immediately retaliate against him. Faced with certain defeat against the Mafia, with threats against his life already carried out, Cutolo chose to dissociate himself from the murder.

Through his sister, Cutolo told the Sicilians that he had never wanted Turatello killed and that Barra had acted out on his own. He claimed that Barra was, in fact, a former friend who had turned into a crazed, out-of-control assassin. Moreover, he promised to collaborate with them in taking care of Barra. Barra was not only left alone to fend off the reprisals of the Sicilians, but now he also had to watch out against violent attacks from the other NCO members.

=== Becoming a Pentito ===
Barra had barely escaped two attacks and was completely stressed out by being on the lookout 24 hours a day. He avoided contact with everyone and chose to prepare his own tea and coffee, while carrying a knife carefully hidden in his anus at all times. Following this betrayal by Cutolo and his abandonment by the NCO, Pasquale Barra decided to become a pentito. From his cell in the local penitentiary in Foggia, Barra summoned Judge Apperti to inform him of his decision to collaborate with the Justice Department on October 18, 1982, thus becoming the first NCO member to become an informant.

In exchange for greater protection, Barra decided to reveal details of NCO murders, and went on to testify against Cutolo and numerous NCO members during the three-year-long Maxi Trials, which resulted from the NCO's crackdown in 1983. Barra's testimony, along with those of Giovanni Pandico, Pasquale D'Amico, Mario Incarnato, etc., were found reliable and convincing enough to become a significant factor in the convictions of more than 800 defendants. However, many of the pentiti's allegations were proved to be fabrications, and several of the convicted defendants were released.
