= Carmine Alfieri =

Italian Camorra boss

- Born: 18 February 1943 (age 83); Saviano, Campania, Italy
- Other names: 'O 'ntufato ("The angry one")
- Known for: High-ranking member of the Nuova Famiglia (formerly)
- Allegiance: Alfieri clan / Camorra (formerly)

Carmine Alfieri (Italian pronunciation: [ˈkarmine alˈfjɛːri]; born 18 February 1943) is an Italian Camorra boss, who rose from Piazzolla di Nola to become one of the most powerful members of Neapolitan Camorra in the 1980s. As boss of the Alfieri clan, he was one of the most influential and powerful Camorra bosses from 1984 until his arrest in 1992. Alfieri's nickname is 'o 'ntufato, the angry one, thanks to the dissatisfied, angry sneer he wears constantly.

== Biography ==
=== Early career ===
Alfieri was born in Saviano, near Naples. The Camorra entered in his life when he was only seven. In 1953, he took an oath with his brother Salvatore, to avenge the killing of their father Antonio Alfieri. Three years later, in 1956, Salvatore Alfieri killed the murderer of his father. In the 1960s, Carmine was first arrested. In 1974, he was initiated in the Camorra as uomo d'onore (man of honour). In 1978 he was charged with homicide and in 1981 with mafia association.

In the 1980s he was among the founders of the Nuova Famiglia, which was opposed to the then dominant Nuova Camorra Organizzata of Raffaele Cutolo. The rivalry caused a ferocious war with a huge number of victims, including Carmine's brother Salvatore. The Alfieri clan of the 1980s and 1990s exhibited a hubris and a penchant for wanton violence that compared favourably with Cosa Nostra’s spectacular assassinations. According to police estimates, Alfieri’s killers alone counted as many as 500 murders during the decade 1983-93. For instance, Domenico Cuomo, Alfieri's main hitman, confessed to have committed over 90 murders within the same period.

=== Rise to power ===
Cutolo overplayed his hand in the Cirillo kidnap affair. His former political protectors turned and provided their support to Carmine Alfieri, his main rival in the bloody 1981-83 Camorra war between Cutolo’s Nuova Camorra Organizzata (NCO) and the Nuova Famiglia. In November 1982, the NCO's financier, Alfonso Ferrara Rosanova, was murdered. When Cutolo’s deputy and main ‘military’ chief, Vincenzo Casillo was killed via a car bomb in January 1983 by the allies of Alfieri, it was clear Cutolo not only had lost his political protection but the war as well. Many other Camorra gangs understood the shift in the balance of power caused by the death of Casillo. They abandoned the NCO and allied themselves with Alfieri.

After the defeat of Cutolo, war broke out among the anti-NCO coalition, in particular between the Nuvoletta clan from Marano and Antonio Bardellino at the end of 1983. Alfieri sided with Bardellino's Casalesi clan. The war culminated in the Torre Annunziata's massacre of August 1984, which left eight people killed and 24 wounded among the Gionta clan allied with Nuvoletta. After the massacre and the murder of Ciro Nuvoletta two months earlier, the balance of power shifted in favour of Alfieri.

In the first instance, Alfieri and others were convicted for having organised the massacre and given life sentences. However, on appeal they were acquitted thanks to the intervention of politicians and the help of judge Armando Cono Lancuba.

Alfieri's Camorra is described as the "political Camorra" because of its ability to obtain public sector contracts through political contacts. Cutolo's "mass Camorra" of unemployed youth specializes in protection rackets, and Lorenzo Nuvoletta's "business Camorra" reinvested drug money into construction following the 1980 earthquake. The political Camorra was also innovatory because it tried to establish a federation between clans to overcome mutual suspicion and bloody feuds.

=== Arrest and turncoat ===
Alfieri, one of the most wanted men in Italy, was arrested in his pyjamas by Italian police on 11 September 1992, together with Vincenzo Cesarano and Marzio Sepe. At the time of his arrest, Alfieri's personal assets were estimated at US$1.2 billion, making him the richest criminal in Italy.

In March 1994, like his former lieutenant Pasquale Galasso who preceded him, Alfieri became a pentito. Both Alfieri and Galasso clarified numerous homicides and implicated the former Italian Minister of the Interior Antonio Gava and dozens of other politicians. They claim not only to have met Gava, but insist that Gava used his influence to win the release of several convicted camorristi. His decision to become a pentito spurred the Camorra to kill several members of Alfieri's blood family, including his son Antonio, a brother Francesco, a nephew and Vincenzo Giugliano, son-in-law.

== Books ==
- Barrese, Orazio, ed. (1994). Camorra politica pentiti. Soveria Mannelli: Rubbettino.
- Behan, Tom, ed. (2002). See Naples and Die: The Camorra and Organized Crime. London/New York: Taurus Publishers. ISBN 9781860647833.
- Grado, Alfredo (2005). Camorra. Rome: Edizioni universitarie romane.
- Stille, Alexander (1995). Excellent Cadavers. The Mafia and the Death of the First Italian Republic, New York: Vintage ISBN 0-09-959491-9
