= The Professor (1986 film) =

1986 film by Giuseppe Tornatore

- Directed by: Giuseppe Tornatore
- Written by: Giuseppe Tornatore
- Starring: Ben Gazzara; Laura Del Sol; Leo Gullotta; Franco Interlenghi
- Cinematography: Blasco Giurato
- Edited by: Mario Morra
- Music by: Nicola Piovani
- Distributed by: Titanus
- Release date: 12 September 1986
- Running time: 168 minutes (in Italy)
- Country: Italy
- Language: Italian

The Professor (Italian: Il camorrista) is a 1986 Italian noir-crime drama directed by Giuseppe Tornatore. His film debut, it is based on the true story of the Italian crime boss Raffaele Cutolo, and adapted from the novel by Giuseppe Marrazzo. The international version is shorter than the original Italian release.

== Plot ==
In 1963, the young man Franco, kills a boy who had harassed his sister Rosaria, and ends up in prison. Over the space of 10 years in Poggioreale prison in Naples, he becomes known as 'Oh Professor 'e Vesuviano (Raffaele Cutolo in real life), a powerful, feared and respected figure. With his friends Alfredo Canale and Gaetano Zarra "the animal", he creates the criminal organization "Camorra Riformata". All run of the Professor prison cell, the organization grows and spreads until in the 70s it clashes with the old families of the Camorra, starting the War of the Camorra that will bleed all of South Italy in the 1970s and 1980s.

The earth trembles

In 1980, an earthquake strikes Naples and the Campania region. Fighting over the flood of government reconstruction money, the Camorrista war continues even more brutally than before. In 1981, the Red Brigades kidnap the regional Assessor Mimmo Mesillo (Ciro Cirillo in real life). Members of Mesillo's political party, the Christian Democrats, turn to the Professor to intervene, fearing that Mesillo will confess party secrets. In exchange, the Professor is promised freedom on mental illness grounds, and 3 billion in ransom. The assessor is freed, but taken into custody by the secret services rather than the police.

The fall of the Professor and the disappearance of C.R.

The politicians do not respect the agreement and the Professor is put in the high-security prison of Asinara, by special decree of Italian president Sandro Pertini. This furthers the disintegration of the Professor's organization as his trusted men begin cooperating with the police. His sister Rosaria tries to counteract the damage, but to no avail. In the end, They kill Ciro, a trusted man who had sold out to politicians, by blowing him up in his car and dissolving his woman in acid. After these two killings, he is driven insane, thinking that someday his men will release him.

== Cast ==
- Ben Gazzara as Franco, aka 'O Professore 'e Vesuviano
- Laura del Sol as Rosaria
- Leo Gullotta as Commissario Iervolino
- Nicola Di Pinto as Alfredo Canale
- Luciano Bartoli as Ciro Parrella
- Maria Carta as mother Franco's and Rosaria
- Biagio Pelligra as Vincenzo, Franco's father and Rosaria
- Franco Interlenghi as Don Saverio
- Piero Vida as Mimmo Mesillo
- Marzio Honorato as Salvatore
- Lino Troisi as Antonio 'Or bad meat
- Anita Zagaria as Anna, 'Oh Professor wife
- Mario Frera as Boss
- Pino D'Angiò as Verzella
- Giacomo Piperno as Quaestor
- Marino Masè as Sapienza

== Awards ==
- Nastro d'Argento Best New Director (Giuseppe Tornatore)
- David di Donatello Best Supporting Actor (Leo Gullotta)
