= Nuova Camorra Organizzata =

- Founded: 24 October 1970
- Founded by: Raffaele Cutolo
- Founding location: Ottaviano, Campania, Italy
- Years active: 1970–late 1980s
- Territory: Naples metropolitan area, Milan, Rimini, Rome, South Lazio and Apulia in Italy, as well as other parts of Europe
- Ethnicity: Italians, mostly Campanians
- Membership (est.): 7,000 full members
- Criminal activities: Racketeering, murder, illegal gambling, drug trafficking, extortion, loan-sharking, money laundering, fencing, prostitution, fraud, corruption, waste management, robbery, totonero (bookmaking)
- Allies: Nuova Grande Camorra Pugliese; Banda della Magliana; Turatello Crew 'Ndrangheta
- Rivals: Sicilian Mafia; Nuova Famiglia (defunct)

The Nuova Camorra Organizzata (in English: New Organized Camorra) was an Italian Camorra criminal organization founded in the late 1970s by a Neapolitan Camorrista, Raffaele Cutolo, in the region of Campania. It was also known by the initials NCO. The organization was established with the purpose of reforming the traditional Camorra, which had long controlled cigarette smuggling and extortion schemes in Neapolitan markets. To this end, Cutolo created a structured and hierarchical organization, in stark contrast to the Camorra in that period, which was traditionally composed of independent and autonomous clans. The members of the NCO were often referred to by rival Camorristi and Italian law enforcement as "Cutoliani".

According to the Italian Justice Department, by 1981 the NCO had become the strongest Camorra clan and one of the most powerful criminal organizations in the nation, providing a living for at least 200,000 people in the Neapolitan area alone. It was distinctly hostile to the Sicilian Mafia, but had an alliance with numerous Calabrian 'Ndrangheta clans, in addition to the Nuova Grande Camorra Pugliese, which was the precursor to the Sacra Corona Unita in Apulia.

It was eventually supplanted by the Nuova Famiglia, a confederation of clans consisting of Michele Zaza (a Camorra boss with strong ties with Cosa Nostra), the Gionta clan (from Torre Annunziata), the Nuvoletta clan from Marano, Antonio Bardellino from San Cipriano d'Aversa and Casal di Principe, the Alfieri clan of Saviano led by Carmine Alfieri, the Galasso clan of Poggiomarino (led by Pasquale Galasso), the Giuliano clan from Naples' quarter Forcella (led by Luigi Giuliano) and the Vollaro clan from Portici (led by Luigi Vollaro).

It was considered extinct in the late 1980s, when many of its bosses and members were killed or imprisoned. Cutolo's Camorra is described as the "mass Camorra" of unemployed youth specializing in protection rackets, while Carmine Alfieri's Camorra was seen as the "political Camorra" because of its ability to obtain public sector contracts through political contacts, and Lorenzo Nuvoletta's as the "business Camorra" reinvesting drug money into construction following the 1980 earthquake.

== History ==
=== Formation ===
The founder of this organization, Raffaele Cutolo, also known as "'o Professore" (The Professor), was born on 20 December 1941 in Ottaviano, a village in the hinterland of Naples. At the age of 18, on 24 February 1963, he committed his first homicide and was subsequently convicted and sentenced to life imprisonment, reduced to 24 years after appeal. He was sent to Poggioreale, Naples' prison. Entering the prison world on a murder conviction made Cutolo a "tough guy".

In prison Cutolo learned the rules of the criminal world: he became a "man of honour," paid respect to more powerful inmates, and started gathering personal prestige because of his striking personality. He never lost sight of his ambition and his desire to become one of the biggest bosses of the Neapolitan underworld.

Cutolo had established himself as a ringleader, when Antonio Spavone aka "'o Malommo" (The Badman), was transferred to the Poggioreale prison. He challenged Spavone to a knife fight in the courtyard (a practise called 'o dichiaramento, the declaration), but Spavone refused. The challenged boss allegedly limited himself to a reply: "Today's young men want to die young by whatever means." Spavone was released from prison shortly after this event. From his prison cell, Cutolo ordered the murder of Spavone. A hitman, allegedly Cutolo's friend, shot him in the face from short range with a shotgun. Spavone survived the ambush, but the shotgun blast left considerable damage to his facial structure, which required plastic surgery. Spavone immediately resigned from his highly visible role as a Camorra boss.

It was from within Naples' Poggioreale prison that Cutolo built the NCO. He began by befriending young inmates unfamiliar with jail, giving them a sense of identity and worth, so much so that when they were released they would send Cutolo "flowers" (i.e. money), which enabled him to increase his network. He helped poorer prisoners by buying food for them from the jail store, or arranging for food to be sent in from outside. In such ways, Cutolo created many "debts" or "rain cheques" which he would cash at the opportune moment. As his following grew, he also began to exercise a monopoly of violence within a number of prisons, thus increasing his power. By the early 1970s, Cutolo had become so powerful that he was able to decide which of his followers would be moved to which jails, use a prison governor's telephone to make calls anywhere in the world, and allegedly even slap the prison governor on one occasion for daring to search his cell. Another key bond Cutolo created was regular payments to the families of NCO members sent to prison, thereby guaranteeing the allegiance of both prisoners and their families.

Cutolo was soon able to gather under him a small group of prisoners, the nucleus of which would later become the leadership of the NCO. They were Antonino Cuomo aka "'o Maranghiello" (The Cudgel), Pasquale Barra aka "'o Nimale" (The Animal), Giuseppe Puca aka "'o Giappone" (The Japanese), Pasquale D'Amico aka "'o Cartunaro" (The Cardboard picker) and Vincenzo Casillo aka "'o Nirone" (The Big Black). After being released, they would set up the first criminal activities on the outside which would be directly controlled by Cutolo from within the penitentiary system.

=== Structure ===
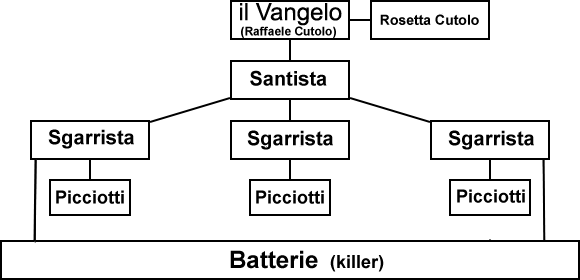
Structure of NCO

The NCO developed two parallel structures, one inside the penitentiary system called "cielo coperto" (covered sky), and the other outside the penitentiary system called "cielo scoperto" (clear sky). Since Cutolo and many NCO members were serving life sentences, communication between these two structures were of utmost importance. To retain his leadership, Cutolo needed to relay his orders to NCO members outside in an effective and reliable way, while simultaneously insuring that some of the profits generated by the expansion be delivered to prisons so that he could expand his recruitment drive.

The peculiar conditions at Poggioreale prison which included its strategic location in the centre of Naples Western District and continuous flow of people such as parole violators and relatives of prisoners, to and from the prison made it possible for the NCO to successfully coordinate criminal activities from their centralized location. The NCO used this continuous flow to bring money and goods to prison and to send directives to their associates for outside operations. The relatives who could visit daily were being used as primary couriers, but when they were unavailable, some of these associates would be certified on paper as kin through the courtesy of obliging clerks from various municipalities in the area, especially Cutolo's municipality in Ottaviano.

As the Justice Department discovered in 1983, Cutolo was visited daily from July 1977 to December 1978 by Giuseppe Puca who had a document from Ottaviano's municipality certifying him to be Cutolo's first cousin. He had also received three visits from another NCO member, Giuseppe Romano, one as Cutolo's brother-in-law, one as compare and finally as first cousin. The NCO became the organizing principle of a new kinship system based on Comparaggio, first cousins and allied kin, which was formally written into the municipal registry by obliging local bureaucrats.

Once the first NCO group became operative and started generating profits, Cutolo established the soccorso verde (green cross) to help the NCO recruit new members from the prison population, providing them with clothes, lawyers, legal advice, money for themselves and their families, and even luxury items. There was a regular procedure for this financial allocation to prisoners. From the very beginning, Cutolo had his men set aside 500,000 lire from each successful operation in a fund for the prison population. This fund was distributed to inmates belonging to the NCO all over Italy through wire service by Raffaele's sister Rosetta Cutolo and some NCO lieutenants.

In an attempt to control the entire region, the NCO surpassed the family structure of the urban Camorra. The NCO was an open structure with new members incorporated at a rate of 1,000 per year. Membership was open to everyone, the primary requisites being swearing loyalty to Cutolo and contributing to the common criminal activities. However, as soon as the organization's business expanded and there was a need for more manpower, recruitment became more aggressive and later, even mandatory. In prison, people were forced to become members of the NCO. Failure to do so would often result in the murder of the unwilling prisoner.

The organization was a federation of different gangs, with their own territorial areas of action, but hierarchically ordered and tightly controlled by Raffaele Cutolo. A document found on pentito, Pasquale D'Amico, described the organization as a "Door-to-door sales business, specializing in underwear and lingerie". Cutolo was the CEO. There was a vice-chief executive at large (Vincenzo Casillo replacing Cutolo for emergency decisions, since Cutolo's reaction time was delayed by his imprisonment), an executive board (on which sat the members of the original group), then area managers, branch managers, and finally, salesmen in charge of collecting the weekly money from their rackets. Outside of prison, there was an executive meeting every fifteen days, where Rosetta Cutolo, who as the boss's sister, could easily communicate with him in prison.

=== Ideology ===
Cutolo had an ideology, another factor that appealed to rootless and badly educated youths. He founded the NCO in his home town Ottaviano on 24 October 1970, the day of Cutolo's patron saint, San Raffaele, and the organization used a statute of rules and regulations that were deliberately meant to have a striking resemblance to the Camorra of the last century. In such a way, Cutolo created the most powerful organization ever to exist in the Neapolitan hinterland. Using his personal appeal and almost magic charisma, he was able to achieve this single-handedly.

The NCO strongholds were the towns to the east of Naples, such as Ottaviano. From its start, the NCO advocated using illegal resources available in the territory for the betterment of the community, claimed the role of protector of the community and assumed a strong regional identity based on criminal values. He accused the Sicilian Mafia of wanting to colonize Naples and the Campania. Cutolo appealed to a Campanian rather than Neapolitan sense of identity, perhaps as a result of his poor peasant background.

For instance, Cutolo is once reported as having said: "The day when the people of Campania understand that it is better to eat a slice of bread as a free man than to eat a steak as a slave is the day when Campania will win." He talked about the need to re-establish respect for the people of this region: "We have to renew the ancient splendors of Naples and the Campania. We have to give back its destiny to our region, represented by the symbol of Vesuvio."

It was this approach that made the NCO openly hostile to the Sicilian Mafia and other Camorra clans, and Cutolo consequently developed a long-standing alliance with the 'Ndrangheta, who had no intentions or designs in either Naples or Campania. Cutolo had strong ties with the 'Ndrangheta. According to some pentiti, Cutolo's career started with his affiliation with the 'Ndrangheta, supported by important bosses such as Giuseppe Piromalli, Paolo De Stefano, and Mammoliti. Cutolo based his organisation of the NCO on the model of the 'Ndrangheta, its internal codes and rituals. The NCO also established strong ties with the Apulian Sacra Corona Unita and the Roman Banda della Magliana, two other criminal organizations that did not directly operate in Campania.

The organisation was unique in the history of the Camorra in that it was highly centralised and possessed a rudimentary form of ideology. For example, he publicly declared that children were not to be kidnapped or mistreated and allegedly arranged the assassination of at least one kidnapper. Perhaps the most potent ideological weapon was the cult of violence, which sometimes bordered on a kind of death wish, as Cutolo once wrote: "the value of a life doesn’t consist of its length but in the use made of it; often people live a long time without living very much. Consider this, my friends, as long as you are on this earth everything depends on your will-power, not on the number of years you have lived."

Through his book of thoughts and poems, Poesie e pensieri and his many interviews with journalists, Cutolo was able to create a strong sense of identity amongst his members. The book was published in Naples in 1980, but never distributed to the public. The book, containing 235 pages of poems and pictures, was seized by the police and censored as an "apology of a criminal organization." According to the Justice department, this book was viewed by NCO members as the "Bible of the NCO" and was particularly popular in prison, due to Cutolo's own distribution by mail. Even though his book was impounded by magistrates within days of its publication, many prisoners, alienated from society both inside and outside jail, wrote to Cutolo and other NCO leaders asking for a copy. Its possession alone would later be considered incriminating evidence.

Cutolo openly supported the young inmates, who were confronted with abuse, brutality, physical aggression and rape. He provided them with advice and protection from the brutalities of other inmates. At the same time they learned how to behave as a good picciotto, the lowest entry level into the Camorra. Cutolo challenged the old Camorra bosses and gave the youngsters a structure to belong to: "The new Camorra must have a statute, a structure, an oath, a complete ceremony, a ritual that must excite people to the point that they would risk their lives for this organization." Cutolo was revered by his soldiers. They called him Prince and kissed his left hand as if he were a bishop.

Cutolo spent a great amount of time researching the 19th century Camorra and reconstructed the old Camorristic ritual of initiation. He took great care in making the ritual a binding social practise. In his cell, he created a ceremony in which the initiate received the award of the primo regalo (first gift) also called abbraccio (embrace) or fiore (flower). He infused the old Camorristic traditions with Catholicism and reconstituted the ritual of initiation of the traditional Camorra.

The NCO has often been described as the "expression of a kind of collective mass movement of the violent and disbanded youth of Campania". However, an historian once declared the NCO to be just another "gangsters association" which had usurped the old and to some extent, respectful name of the Camorra.

When the journalist Giorgio Rossi interviewed some of the young NCO members from Ottaviano, he recorded several testimonies of how willing were they to die for their boss and organization. One young picciotto said: "You ask me why I do what I do. The answer is simple. I don't care if I die or live. Actually in a way I'm looking for my death." A second picciotto said, "We are running towards our death. There is no purpose to living here. This is a bad life. Life here counts zero. What I have seen in these 23 years is enough and I'm already dead. Now I'm living on borrowed time. If they want to kill me, fine, what I have seen is enough." Similarly, a third one said, "We are in such a state that if they try to step on us, we will kill. We are the living dead. I have already half a foot stepping on my head. If you step on me with the other half, I'll kill you."

In a letter found by the local police, a young picciotto named Turisio Agrippino wrote to Salvatore Federico: "The true god is our beloved Raffaele Cutolo." Another young member of the NCO named Antonio Lucarelli aka "'o Giarrone" (The rascal) told a national television reporter in a televised interview from Cutolo's family courtyard that he was ready to give his life for Cutolo. Cutolo thanked him by having one of his men, Marco Medda, write him a letter which was later seized by the police: "My dear Giarrone, your interview greatly flattered the professor; he is honored, in case of need, to accept the blood that from your noble vein will flow into his own. My dear Giarrone, you are a man of great quality." Three months later, Lucarelli was killed during a clash with a rival gang.

=== Acquiring and consolidating power ===
The NCO spread in the crisis-ridden Campanian towns of the late 1970s, offering alienated youths an alternative to a lifetime of unemployment or poorly paid jobs. Hundreds of young men were employed as enforcers. Initially, the main specialisation of NCO gangs was extorting money through protection rackets from local businesses. The police calculated that the NCO had some 7000 armed associates in 1980. While the traditional Camorristic families held territorial powers and the consequent responsibility over their controlled areas, the NCO had no qualms over breaking the established social fabric by extorting shopkeepers, small factories and businesses, and building contractors. In its quest for cash, it even targeted individuals such as landlords, lawyers and professionals. The NCO's protection racket even included a transient circus.

The NCO later branched out to cocaine trafficking, partly because it was less subject to police investigation than heroin, but also because the Sicilian Mafia was less involved in the cocaine trade. He also embarked on a ruthless campaign against the Sicilian Mafiosi operating in Campania. The years of the NCO's domination (1979–1983) saw the highest number of homicides, of which there were 900 in Campania alone.

At the end of the 1970s, two types of Camorra gangs began to take shape: the NCO type gangs led by Cutolo, which dealt mainly in Cocaine and protection rackets, preserving a strong regional sense of identity, and the business oriented clans allied with the Mafia which were led by the likes of Michele Zaza, Carmine Alfieri, Lorenzo Nuvoletta, etc., who dealt in cigarettes and heroin, but soon moved on to invest in real estate and construction firms.

Cutolo's NCO became more powerful by encroaching and taking over other group's territories. The NCO was able to break the circle of traditional power held by the families. Cutolo's organization was just too aggressive and violent to be resisted by any individual families. Other Camorra families initially were too weakened, too divided, and simply too intimidated by the NCO. Their territories were indefensible against an organization like the NCO, which raided and rules large areas, not by constant control, but by violence and quick action. Unlike the traditional Camorra clans which used slow and static methods of conducting their business, the gangs grouped inside the NCO displayed an open-ended dynamic force that depended on speed and movement. They usually came into the city from elsewhere, from the undifferentiated territories of the countryside; their men spread out across open space, relying on fast cars, motorcycles and mobile firepower instead of fortified positions.

The NCO even had an extraterritorial hit team composed of the most violent gang members from its various criminal gangs, who were ready to do the NCO's bidding by wreaking destruction and violence when required. It was a ten-man team, capable of quick response to any emergency. It had some extremely powerful cars at its disposal which could cover the entire area of Naples in less than an hour. Its firing power was in the order of 10,000 bullets per minute.

Cutolo insisted that if other criminal groups wanted to keep their business, they had to pay the NCO protection on all their activities, including a percentage for each carton of cigarettes smuggled into Naples. This practice came to be known as ICA (Imposta Camorra Aggiunta – or Camorristic Sale Tax), mimicking the state VAT sale tax IVA (Imposta sul Valore Aggiunto). For instance, Michele Zaza, the biggest Neapolitan cigarette smuggler, was reported to have paid the NCO more than 4 billion lire in the first three months after the imposition of the racket.

=== Move into Apulia ===
Raffaele Cutolo decided to expand the NCO to the neighboring region of Apulia in the late 1970s and early 1980s. This was precipitated by a number of factors.

Firstly, a number of Camorristi had been incarcerated or forced to resettle in Apulia. In the 1970s, a large number of NCO members had been relocated from their prisons in Campania to the local Pugliese prisons resulting in massive prison overcrowding. Furthermore, by the early 1980s a new smuggling route from Yugoslavia had been opened, and Apulia became a crucial juncture of this trade. Apulia's geographical features were of great interest for possible exploitation of its strategic potential, since it had a particularly extensive coastal area, a territory which was conveniently linked to the main motorways of Central-Northern Italy, and several mid sized airports.

The absence of any local criminal association made Apulia a natural place for border crossings by Camorra clans who had the opportunity to exploit a particularly lucrative market there, free from any threatening local competition.

The NCO members soon attempted to install themselves at the highest levels of power inside the prison, harassing other prisoners (specifically with requests for money) as well as offering membership in their organization, a process called legalizzazione (legislation). After consulting with his nephew Stephen Cutolo, Raffaele decided to adopt a strategy of assimilation of the local criminals. He opened availability for membership in the NCO to the locals, and decided to intervene directly, promoting a series of meeting with the purpose of "legalizing" new bosses for Apulia. This process was called capi-zona a cielo scoperto (local outside bosses).

To this end, Cutolo founded a separate branch of the NCO in Apulia called the Nuova Grande Camorra Pugliese (NGCP) in 1981, a formal organization particularly active in the area around Foggia, modeled after its parent organization in Campania, but with its own command hierarchy. It was headed by the brothers, Specidato and Gurrieri. The NGCP was created with the sole objective to unite all the groups in the region and constitute an autonomous, parallel organization with respect to the NCO, though still subject to it economically.

Initially, there were no problems between the native criminals and the NCO. Their working relationship continued for years with no undue interference. At first local criminals were managing the illegal trades while the NCO lent financial resources and support demanding 40% of all profits derived from illegal activities. The local criminals were involved only during particularly difficult operations, and then contacts were established directly with single individuals or small groups active for some time in smuggling which for strategic reasons was concentrated mainly in the Brindisi area. However, the final outcome was not what he had planned and this arrangement proved to be an unstable one.

Soon the local criminals tried to free themselves from the masters. Cutolo's relentless defeats in the wars against the Nuova Famiglia in Campania weakened the hegemony and prestige of the NCO which eventually collapsed in its entirety. Soon, this affiliation with the NCO was dissolved and replaced by a working relationship with the Calabrian 'Ndrangheta, whose leaders did not demand a share of the illicit profits. On 1 May 1983, with the sponsorship of the 'Ndrangheta capobastone, Giuseppe Rogoli founded the Sacra Corona Unita in Bari prison, a new Mafia invoking the regional Pugliese identity against the intrusion of the foreign Neapolitans. The Sacra Corona Unita received its legitimacy from Rogoli's induction into the 'Ndrangheta by the Calabrian 'Ndranghetisti, Carmine Alvaro and Umberto Bellocco, who were incarcerated with him in Porto Azzurro.

=== Formation of Nuova Famiglia ===
During the NCO's highest point of expansion, Camorra boss, Michele Zaza had to pay Cutolo's organisation US$400,000 for the right to carry on operating in contraband cigarettes. However, no hierarchy between Camorra gangs or stable spheres of influence had been created, and no gang leader was likely to agree to taking a back seat without making a fight of it. In 1978, Zaza formed a ‘honourable brotherhood’ (Onorata fratellanza) in an attempt to get the Mafia-aligned Camorra gangs to oppose Cutolo and his NCO, although without much success.

In mid 1979, the NCO took on the Giuliano clan, which had traditionally controlled the Forcella, or "Casbah" area in the centre of Naples. Prior to this, the Giuliano clan had been in good terms with the NCO until the first half of 1979. The clan was also under such bad terms with Michele Zaza that it launched an attack against his nephew Pasquale in December 1979. Another Camorra clan leader named Luigi Vollaro aka "'o Califfo" (the Caliph) had first raised the idea of an anti-Cutolo alliance with the Giuliano clan boss, Luigi Giuliano in 1979, following Cutolo's demand to receive a cut from his illegal gambling centres and lottery system in his base of Portici. A provisional death squad was set up, which contributed to the dozens of gangland deaths that year.

The breaking point was reached when the NCO tried to move into the Giuliano's stronghold of Forcella, Piazza Mercato and Via Duomo, in the centre of Naples. A few days before Christmas, 1980, two NCO members presented themselves at an unloading of contraband cigarettes at Santa Lucia and demanded immediate payment of $400,000 to their organization, as well as insisting on future payment of $25 for every crate of cigarettes brought ashore. They then proceeded to shoot and injure one of the Giuliano gang members unloading the cigarettes. On Christmas Eve, the gang's leader, Luigi Giuliano, was also wounded in an attack.

The clash, which had occurred in a period of growing tension, led to the formation of the Nuova Famiglia (NF) to contrast Cutolo's predominant NCO, consisting of Zaza, the Nuvoletta's and Antonio Bardellino from Casal Di Principe (the so-called "Casalesi"). It was formed as a federation of Anti-Cutolo Camorra clans, and copied the organizational structure of the NCO. In stark contrast to the NCO's Campania-based model, the NF sought to impose a more traditional conduct based on the Sicilian code of conduct. The attacks continued through January 1981, until a summit meeting was called at the end of the month in a Roman hotel, under the mediation of Antonio Spavone. It was attended by the NF leaders and the NCO was represented by Rosetta Cutolo and Vincenzo Casillo. Representatives from the Sicilian Mafia were also present in the meeting.

=== 1980 Camorra War ===
A shaky peace was established, only to be broken on 14 February when, during the confusion provoked by a strong earth tremor, NCO members in Naples' Poggioreale prison killed three adversaries. A more serious incident occurred in May, when the NCO bombed houses in Portici owned by men working in the contraband cigarette trade for the Zaza brothers. This was soon followed by retaliatory acts from the rival Nuova Famiglia. The two men who had tried to encroach on the Zaza's patch were shot and a car bomb was planted outside Cutolo's family home in Ottaviano.

From 1980 to 1983, a bloody war raged in and around Naples, which left several hundred dead and severely weakened the NCO. It had its root causes in two main events: the rapid growth of two distinct types of Camorra gangs and the profound political and financial instability created by the November 1980 earthquake. The war soon became a straightforward battle for power which was fueled by the billions pouring in from Rome for earthquake reconstruction. For instance, the highest number of deaths occurred in the 1981–82 period, when most of the reconstruction contracts were being assigned. The number of gangland murders soon grew to epic proportions. During this period, some Neapolitans would place illegal and macabre bets, in a system controlled by the Camorra itself, on whether there would be more gangland murders than days over the coming year. Between 16 and 19 June 1983, police arrested a thousand members of the NCO.

The earthquake had a major impact on the criminal underworld. A lot of people lost their businesses and were left unemployed and destitute. Without any place to work at, these displaced persons particularly the young men, turned to the NF and NCO for work. During this time, the NCO was getting richer by infiltrating the network of earthquake relief agencies. It hoarded enormous quantities of relief funds and goods, and charged fees for protecting all businesses involved in earthquake re-construction.

In addition to the massive hoarding, the NF was also greatly benefited by deterritorialization of the Camorra underworld in Naples. The earthquake had totally destroyed all social control, due to the displacement of people, cafes, small businesses and the cordoning of social blocks. The anti-Cutolo clans began to restructure themselves on the model of the NCO. Lacking any territory, they came to depend on open space, swapping their fortified positions for fast cars, motorcycles and mobile firepower. In this way, the NF began using the NCO's own tactics against them, i.e., high visibility, speed and brutal violence. In an act reminiscent of both Italian neo-fascist and left-wing terrorist groups, they sent messages to the press signed, "Nuclei Armati Anti-Cutoliani" (Armed Nucleus Anti-Cutolo) or "Giustizieri Campani" (Avengers from Campania) complete with their new slogans "Let's slay the coto-lette (literally porkchops, a pun on Cutolo's name)" and "Fight back". The savage war caused great inconveniences on the lives of the Neaploitan citizens, such that even a normal stroll through downtown Naples could be a potentially hazardous and life-threatening situation.

This savage war caused in turn a greater attention from the Italian police organizations, pushing the Sicilian Mafia to accommodate an agreement between the two warring clans, favouring the Nuova Famiglia, which included a lot of former allies. Many high-ranking Sicilian mafiosi such as Leoluca Bagarella, Bernardo Provenzano and Totò Riina repeatedly tried to eliminate Cutolo. The war left Cutolo more exposed in terms of notoriety. He had not expected such a strong backlash from his adversaries, and his strong hostility to the Sicilian Mafia gave them another tactical advantage, in that they were able to obtain assistance from the Mafia.

The individual gangs of the NF alliance had the added advantage of being less notorious than Cutolo's NCO. The NF were initially less affected by police crackdowns and investigations and were therefore able to carry the attack to the NCO, although the NF had suffered its own massive crackdown in 1984.

=== Defeat of Cutolo ===
In a one-year period between 1983 and 1984, there were a series of arrests and massive crackdowns coordinated by Italian justice on the activities and rackets operated by the NCO. In the first round-up on 17 June 1983 (a day labeled as "the Black Friday of the NCO" by the Neapolitan press), 856 people were arrested on a single day of coordinated operations involving 8,000 police and carabinieri. Of those arrested in a series of raids, 300 were convicted very quickly and another 630 committed for trial. Overall more than a thousand would later be indicted on the crime of association with the NCO.

The resulting Maxi Trial lasted three years and required the participation of nine different judges and scores of legal clerks, attorneys, witnesses, and military policemen. The legal records which included audiotapes of the entire proceedings filled an entire room at Naples' hall of justice.

There was also a steady stream of pentiti or supergrasses during this period, beginning with Pasquale Barra, who realizing that Cutolo was prepared to let him be killed, decided to reveal details of NCO murders in order to gain greater protection. He was then followed by Giovanni Pandico, one of the NCO's underwriter's whose accusations led to many arrests in the 1983 police crackdown. However, many of his accusations were later proven to be unfounded. The third major NCO supergrass was Mario Incarnato, who confessed to a series of murders in late 1983. In the mid-1980s, Giovanni Auriemma exposed the NCO's links with the secret services, whilst Pasquale D'Amico revealed Cutolo's links with the Calabrian 'Ndrangheta.

Organized crime author Tom Behan illustrates the key factors leading to Cutolo's defeat and the downfall of the NCO:

- Firstly, he cites Cutolo's arrogance and impatience which caused the formation of the NF. He further states that had Cutolo moved at a slower pace and sought greater consensus, he might have succeeded in becoming the undisputed boss of the region of Naples.
- Secondly, he cites the youth and the rawness of many of the NCO's "foot soldiers" compared with the more experienced members of the NF gangs. NCO members had a tendency of killing fellow members on mere suspicion of treachery; thus further reducing their numbers. As one pentito recalled; "The cutoliani committed arrogant acts, killing people for no reason."
- Thirdly, he mentions that Cutolo had committed a strategic error in concentrating on labour-intensive activities such as protection rackets and avoiding the more lucrative heroin trafficking rackets almost entirely.

=== Cirillo Kidnapping ===
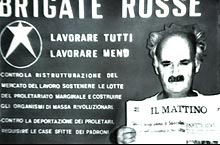
Ciro Cirillo (pictured) during his kidnapping by the Red Brigades

Cutolo had also overplayed his hand in the Cirillo kidnapping affair. On 27 April 1981, the Red Brigades kidnapped the 60-year-old Christian Democrat (DC) politician Ciro Cirillo and killed his two-man escort in the garage of his Naples apartment building. At the time Cirillo directed reconstruction efforts in Campania devastated by the earthquake in the Irpinia region on 23 November 1980.

During the period in which Cirillo was missing, DC politician, Antonio Gava and his party associates contacted both the NCO and the NF with the view to them using their good standing with the Red Brigades to secure his release. The NF, under Carmine Alfieri refused to act, preferring to having nothing to do with the whole affair because he didn't want to be used by the politicians. However, Cirillo's release, as a result of the negotiations by Cutolo and the NCO, raised the spectre for Alfieri and the NF that the NCO had reinforced their association with Gava and his faction by this action.

In return for negotiating the release of Cirillo, Cutolo allegedly asked for a slackening of police operations against the Camorra, for control over the tendering of building contracts in Campania (a lucrative venture since the devastating earthquake in November 1980) and for a reduction of his own sentence – as well as new psychiatric test to show that he is not responsible for his actions. Both these last concessions were granted.

Later, Cutolo began to blackmail Gava, demanding that he respect the deal made and threatening, in the event of non compliance, to create a public scandal by revelations that would have devastated the state institutions (i.e., The Secret Service) which had plotted with him to secure the hostage's release. As a result, his former political protectors turned and provided their support to his main rival Carmine Alfieri.

Pasquale Galasso, the Nuova Famiglia leader who later became a pentito, briefly elaborated the post-kidnapping tension that existed between the DC and NCO, while testifying in court:

The Gavas were feeling the pressure of Raffaele Cutolo's demands as he expected the agreement to be kept and he threatened to unleash a scandal that would have involved the institutional apparatus that had conspired with him for the liberation of Cirillo. So as the Gavas were feeling threatened by Cutolo they turned to and formed an alliance with, the only person who at that moment could fight Cutolo. That person was Carmine Alfieri.

Alfieri, on the other hand, was also very keen to destroy Cutolo. He was well aware that had Cutolo received the advantages he had hoped for, then he would not hesitate to destroy any rival gang. As Galasso stated in court:

When Cirillo was freed, we were well aware that his release was due to Cutolo's intervention, and we were afraid that he had reinforced his association with Gava and Scotti. The murder of Salvatore Alfieri was a signal that Cutolo would never look back, as he felt that he had his back covered by the politicians and the secret services that had been involved in the Cirillo affair.

=== Decline of the NCO ===
It appears that Alfieri had already decided to eliminate the senior NCO leaders for the murders of his brothers during the war. In November 1982, the NCO's financier, Alfonso Ferrara Rosanova, was murdered. When his deputy and main 'military' chief, Vincenzo Casillo was killed via car bomb in January 1983 by Alfieri's ally, Pasquale Galasso, it was clear that Raffaele Cutolo had lost the war. His power declined considerably. Not only Cutolo but many other Camorra gangs understood the shift in the balance of power caused by the death of Casillo. They abandoned the NCO and allied themselves with Alfieri.

The assassination of Casillo was followed by the murders of several NCO members by the Nuova Famiglia. Casillo's partner disappeared a few weeks after his death, and her body was eventually found under in a ditch under a motorway in December 1983. Nicola Nuzzo, a key NCO member involved in the negotiations was battered to death in the ward of a Roman hospital in 1986, soon after a meeting with an investigating magistrate, Carlo Alemi. Salvatore Imperatrice, Casillo's bodyguard and also a member of the NCO negotiating team, died mysteriously in a mental asylum in March 1989. Mario Cuomo, who lost his legs in the explosion that killed Casillo, was eventually murdered in October 1990. Enrico Madonna, Cutolo's defense lawyer was murdered in October 1993, three days after telling a journalist that he was willing to tell a parliamentary commission all he knew about the Cirillo kidnapping affair. Most of the murders were linked to the Cirillo Affair.

Cutolo's influence was also reduced when at the insistence of President Sandro Pertini, he was relocated to a prison on the island Asinara in January 1982, far away from Naples and his ability to communicate with the outside was severely restricted when the harsh 41-bis prison regime was imposed upon him.

The elimination of the key NCO figures not only marked the end of the NCO's defeat as a political and criminal force, but also the rise of Carmine Alfieri and the NF who, by now, virtually unopposed, replaced them as the main contact of the politicians and businessmen in Campania as well as other criminal organizations. These chain of killings, including that of Cutolo's son, Roberto Cutolo who was shot dead by members of the Fabbrocino clan on 24 December 1990, aged 25, coupled with the incarceration of many of its members brought an end to the Nuova Camorra Organizzata. However, with Cutolo and the NCO out of the picture, the NF alliance soon disintegrated into many feuding clans, with a war breaking out between the Bardellino and Nuvoletta clans towards the end of 1983.

=== Death of Cutolo ===
On 17 February 2021, Cutolo died in the prison unit of the Maggiore Hospital in Parma, at the age of 79.

The Polizia di Stato prohibited public funerals.

== See also ==
- Raffaele Cutolo
- Camorra
- Nuova Famiglia
- List of Camorra clans
- List of members of the Camorra
- Sacra Corona Unita
- Turatello Crew
- Banda della Magliana
- 'Ndrangheta
