= Vincenzo Casillo =

Italian Camorrista

- Born: July 8, 1942; San Giuseppe Vesuviano, Campania, Kingdom of Italy
- Died: January 29, 1983 (aged 40); Rome, Lazio, Italy
- Cause of death: Car bomb
- Other names: 'o Nirone (The Big Black)
- Known for: High ranking member of the Nuova Camorra Organizzata
- Allegiance: Nuova Camorra Organizzata; Italian Secret Services

Vincenzo Casillo (Italian pronunciation: [vinˈtʃɛntso kaˈzillo], Neapolitan: [kaˈsillə]; July 8, 1942 – January 29, 1983) was an Italian Camorrista and the second in command of the Nuova Camorra Organizzata, a Camorra organization in Naples. His nickname was 'o Nirone ("the Big Black one").

== Second in Command ==
He was one of the earliest members of the Nuova Camorra Organizzata, since its formation in 1970. Casillo was highly trusted and soon rose to become the deputy and main military chief of crime boss, Raffaele Cutolo, during the period when he was imprisoned in the prisons of Poggioreale and Ascoli Piceno. As the Nuova Camorra Organizzata's second in command, he participated in a high-level meeting with representatives of the Sicilian Mafia and Camorra clans to try to put an end to the bloody war between the Nuova Camorra Organizzata and their rivals from the Nuova Famiglia, together with Cutolo’s sister, Rosetta.

== Purported involvement in the Roberto Calvi murder ==
In June 1996, the Sicilian Mafia pentito, Francesco Di Carlo claimed that Vincenzo Casillo together with another Camorrista, Sergio Vaccari were responsible for the murder of Roberto Calvi, the chairman of Banco Ambrosiano who was dubbed the "God's Banker". Casillo once confessed to murdering the bankrupt financier to Enrico Madonna, Cutolo's lawyer. Madonna himself was later murdered in October 1993, three days after telling a journalist that he was willing to tell a parliamentary commission all he knew about the Cirillo kidnapping affair.

== Negotiator in the Cirillo kidnapping ==
Casillo also played an active role in negotiating the release of the Christian Democrat (DC) politician Ciro Cirillo, who had been kidnapped on April 27, 1981 by the Red Brigades. He managed to do so, in spite of being a wanted man at the time.

== Assassination ==
On 29 January 1983, Casillo was murdered by a bomb planted under the pedal of his car, next to the SISMI Forte Boccea in Rome. Pasquale Galasso, chief of the Galasso clan and member of the rival Nuova Famiglia headed by Carmine Alfieri, was responsible for the blast. This was one of the first times that a Camorra clan had used this kind of technique to dispose of a rival.

Galasso claimed that he killed Casillo in order to free DC politician Antonio Gava and other Christian Democrats from Cutolo's threats. In a meeting held in April 1982, nine months after the kidnapping, Vincenzo Casillo reportedly told Giuliano Granata, the DC mayor who had taken part with him in the negotiations: "You did what you wanted and then washed your hands".

According to Galasso, who later became a pentito, the reasons for his murder were:

First of all, to make it clear to Cutolo that he was finished, and that for once and for all he had to stop blackmailing the politicians and the institutions he had dealt with during the Cirillo affair. It is also beyond doubt that through that action Alfieri wanted to demonstrate to the politicians, mainly to the Dorotea faction and perhaps to Antonio Gava in particular, that he had to be reckoned with. The car bomb was therefore intended to demonstrate Alfieri's real importance.

Although there are some rumors that Cutolo ordered Casillo killed because he had taken Cutolo's part of the Cirillo ransom, Cutolo has stated that he was wary of the untrustworthiness of the politicians and claims to have warned Casillo after the kidnapping:

It was me who told Casillo to keep documentary evidence of the meetings he had with these people, whom I didn't trust because all they do is sell hope by the ton to the poor people, and then, when things don't work as they expected or when they've got what they wanted, they cast you adrift.

Not long after his death, his partner, the dancer Giovanna Matarazzo, declared to judge Carlo Alemi that Casillo's death was linked to the murder of Roberto Calvi. Matarazzo disappeared a few weeks after his death, and her body was eventually found in a ditch under a motorway in December 1983.

The fact that a secret service card that could be used by Casillo was found in his burnt-out car lends some credibility to the scenario that his death might have been linked to the Cirillo kidnapping.

== Aftermath ==
Casillo's death was one of the many factors that brought about the downfall of the Nuova Camorra Organizzata. It represented a turning point in the relationship between the local politicians and the Camorra. After his death, it was clear Cutolo not only had lost his political protection but the war as well. His former political protectors turned and provided their support to his main rival Carmine Alfieri. Many other Camorra gangs understood the shift in the balance of power caused by the death of Casillo. They abandoned the Nuova Camorra Organizzata and allied themselves with Alfieri.

As the Anti-Mafia commission once wrote:

"From that moment (Casillo's death in 1983) until today, Alfieri and his men were able to stain Campania with blood and obtain large slices of the reconstruction cake; for a long time they would also constitute an uncontested effective government in large areas of the region."

On the turning point that had been reached with Casillo's murder, Galasso stated in court:

"As far as I can recall, that is the only crime we talked about in euphoric terms. Alfieri embraced the assassin and congratulated him for the courage he had shown; I know that he later gave him a Rolex."

The assassination of Casillo was followed by the murders of several Nuova Camorra Organizzata members by the Nuova Famiglia. Nicola Nuzzo, a key Nuova Camorra Organizzata member involved in the negotiations was battered to death in the ward of a Roman hospital in 1986, soon after a meeting with Carlo Alemi, the magistrate who was investigating the Ciro Cirillo release case. Salvatore Imperatrice, Casillo's bodyguard and also a member of the Nuova Camorra Organizzata negotiating team, died of mysterious causes – alleged by authorities to be suicide, in a mental asylum in March 1989. Mario Cuomo, who lost his legs in the explosion that killed Casillo, was eventually murdered in October 1990.
