= Tom Behan =

Irish academic & writer (1957–2010)

- Born: 22 June 1957; London, England
- Died: 30 August 2010 (aged 53); Monza (Lombardy), Italy
- Occupations: academic, writer
- Known for: Italian history, politics, culture
- Political party: British Socialist Workers Party

Tom Behan (22 June 1957, in London – 30 August 2010, in Monza) was born from Irish parents. He was an academic and writer on Italian history, politics and culture.

Behan was an active member of the British Socialist Workers Party for over 30 years. In his youth he knew the unfair widespread prejudice against the Irish and he found reading Socialist Worker newspaper what was the only thing he thought that made sense on Ireland. He did not go to university until 1982, and therefore was part of the first post-war youth generation to experience a society of mass youth unemployment. He had lived in Naples in the early 1980s, acquiring an excellent mastery of Italian and noticing the after-earthquake management by the camorristic groups.

By the early 1990s, when he was at the University of Reading (UK), he had collected considerable documentation on organized crime and provided advice to English TV inquiry programs “Channel 4”. After obtaining his doctorate in “Italian studies” and working for about two years in Australia, at La Trobe University of Melbourne, Behan published his first book on the subject (The Camorra, Routledge, London, 1996). He continued to alternate his academic work, first at the University of Glasgow and then in Kent, with an intense participation in global protest events.

He was a Senior Lecturer in Italian at the University of Kent at Canterbury.

Behan was the author of the first political biography of Europe's leading radical playwright and winner of the 1997 Nobel Prize for Literature Dario Fo and an authority on Italian organised crime.

Behan died in Monza (Lombardy) on 30 August 2010 after a long illness and is survived by his partner, Barbara Rampoldi.

== Selected bibliography ==
- Behan, Tom (1991). Forward to 1921: Dissolution of the Italian Communist Party. University of Reading. ISBN 0704909928.
- Behan, Tom (1996). The Camorra: Political Criminality in Italy. London: Routledge. p. 240. ISBN 0415099870.
- Workers' Playtime: Dario Fo Socialist Review, issue 214 (1997)
- Behan, Tom (1997). The Long Awaited Moment: The Working Class and the Italian Communist Party in Milan, 1943-1948. New York: Peter Lang. p. xii-310. ISBN 978-0-8204-2674-7.
- Interview: the return of Italian Communism? International Socialism Journal, issue 84 (1999)
- Behan, Tom (2000). Dario Fo: Revolutionary Theatre. London: Pluto Press. p. 192. ISBN 978-0-7453-1357-3.
- Genoa: Nothing can be the same again International Socialism Journal, issue 92 (2001)
- Behan, Tom (2002). See Naples and Die: The Camorra and Organized Crime. London: I.B.Tauris. p. 244. ISBN 978-1-86064-783-3.
- Behan, Tom (2003). The Resistible Rise of Benito Mussolini. London: Bookmarks. p. 150. ISBN 978-1-898876-90-8. (review at Socialist Worker)
- The legacy of Giuseppe Garibaldi - the 19th century's Che Guevara Socialist Worker (2007)
- Giovanni Pesce: leading Italian partisan, who kept fighting for freedom Socialist Worker (2007)
- Behan, Tom (2008). Defiance: The Story of One Man Who Stood Up to the Sicilian Mafia. London: I.B.Tauris. p. 232. ISBN 978-1-84511-514-2. (narrates the political and human story of Peppino Impastato)
- How capitalism created the mafia Socialist Worker (2008)
- Aldo Moro killing: a miscalculation that almost destroyed the Italian left Socialist Worker (2008)
- Behan, Tom (2009). The Italian Resistance: Fascists, Guerrillas and the Allies (The inspiring story of Italy's anti-fascist partisans). London: Pluto Press. p. 320. ISBN 978-0-7453-2695-5. (It was workers who defeated Mussolini by Alexis Vassiley)
- Behan, Tom (2009). Il libro che la camorra non ti farebbe mai leggere: ritratto di un Paese in ostaggio della criminalità organizzata [The Book that the Camorra Would Never Let You Read: Portrait of a Country Hostage to Organized Crime] (in Italian). Roma: Newton Compton. p. 284. ISBN 978-88-541-1342-8.
