= Raffaele Cutolo =

Italian crime boss (1941–2021)

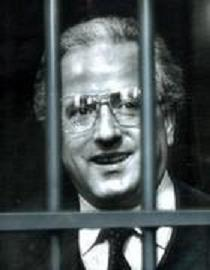
- Cutolo behind bars in 1986
- Born: 4 November 1941; Ottaviano, Kingdom of Italy
- Died: 17 February 2021 (aged 79); Parma, Italy
- Other name: 'o Professore ("the professor")
- Occupation: Founder of the Nuova Camorra Organizzata
- Relatives: Rosetta Cutolo (sister)
- Status: Deceased (imprisoned from 1963)
- Criminal charges: Murder
- Penalty: 4 terms of life imprisonment

Raffaele Cutolo (Italian: [raffaˈɛːle ˈkuːtolo]; 4 November 1941 – 17 February 2021) was an Italian crime boss and leader of the Nuova Camorra Organizzata (NCO), an organisation he built to renew the Camorra. Cutolo had a variety of nicknames including 'o Vangelo ("the gospel"), 'o Princepe ("the prince"), 'o Professore ("the professor") and 'o Monaco ("the monk"). Apart from 18 months on the run, Cutolo lived entirely in maximum-security prisons or psychiatric prisons after 1963. At the time of his death he was serving multiple life sentences for murder.

== Early years ==
Cutolo, the youngest of three, was born in Ottaviano, a town in the hinterland of Naples, into a close-knit Catholic peasant family with no prior ties to the Camorra. After a happy childhood, he did well at primary school and was an altar boy, he lost his father prematurely in 1953 at the age of twelve. His father, an agricultural labourer, had worked for years as a sharecropper to support the family. One day, the landowner informed him that the field would be repurposed the following year and that his services would no longer be needed. In desperation, Cutolo’s father turned to the local Camorra boss, whose influence was absolute in the village. The boss invited the Cutolo family to his home and promised to resolve the matter. Shortly thereafter, the landowner reversed his decision and renewed the contract. After his father's death, he was raised by his elder sister Rosetta Cutolo.

Cutolo was a poor student, and he was violent, inattentive, and prone to trouble. By the age of 12, he was already running with a gang of teenagers, committing petty thefts and extorting local shopkeepers. As soon as he was old enough to drive, he bought a car; not only for status, but also for the mobility it gave him during his raids. At 21, on February 24, 1963, he committed his first murder. The victim was an innocent firefighter that helped a girl Cutolo had slapped following an alleged insult. During the confrontation that followed, Cutolo pulled out a gun and shot the man dead. He was convicted and sentenced to life imprisonment, which was later reduced to 24 years on appeal. He was sent to Poggioreale prison in Naples.

Cutolo had established himself as a ringleader, when Antonio Spavone, known as "'o Malommo" ("The Badman"), was transferred to Poggioreale prison. He challenged Spavone to a knife fight in the courtyard (a practice called "'o dichiaramento", "the declaration"), but Spavone refused. The challenged boss allegedly limited himself to a reply: "Today's young men want to die young by whatever means". Spavone was released from prison shortly after this event. From his prison cell, Cutolo ordered the murder of Spavone. A hitman, allegedly Cutolo's friend, shot Spavone in the face from short range with a shotgun. Spavone survived the ambush, but the shotgun blast left considerable damage to his facial structure, which required plastic surgery. Spavone immediately resigned from his highly visible role as a Camorra boss.

Cutolo was soon able to gather under him a small group of prisoners, the nucleus of which would later become the leadership of the NCO. They were Antonino Cuomo known as "'o Maranghiello" ("The Cudgel"), Pasquale Barra known as "'o Nimale" ("The Animal"), Giuseppe Puca known as "'o Giappone" ("Japanese"), Pasquale D'Amico known as "'o Cartunaro" ("The Cardboard picker") and Vincenzo Casillo known as "'o Nirone" ("The Big Black"). After being released, they would set up criminal activities on the outside which would be directly controlled by Cutolo from within the penitentiary system.

== Nuova Camorra Organizzata ==
From within Naples' Poggioreale prison Cutolo built a new organisation: the Nuova Camorra Organizzata (NCO). He began by befriending young inmates unfamiliar with jail, giving them a sense of identity and worth, so much so that when they were released they would send Cutolo 'flowers' (i.e. money), which enabled him to increase his network. He helped poorer prisoners by buying food for them from the jail store, or arranging for food to be sent in from outside. In such ways Cutolo created many 'debts' or 'rain cheques' which he would cash at the opportune moment. As his following grew, he also began to exercise a monopoly of violence within a number of prisons, thus increasing his power. By the early seventies, Cutolo had become so powerful that he was able to decide which of his followers would be moved to which jails, use a prison governor's telephone to make calls anywhere in the world, and allegedly even slap the prison governor on one occasion for daring to search his cell. Another key bond Cutolo created was regular payments to the families of NCO members sent to prison, thereby guaranteeing the allegiance of both prisoners and their families.

What is unusual about Cutolo is that he has a kind of ideology, another factor that appealed to rootless and badly educated youths. He founded the NCO in his home town Ottaviano on 24 October 1970, the day of Cutolo's patron saint, San Raffaele. In such a way Cutolo created the most powerful organization ever to exist in the Neapolitan hinterland. Using his personal appeal and almost magic charisma, he was able to achieve this single-handedly. Cutolo had strong ties with the Calabrian 'Ndrangheta. According to some pentiti, Cutolo's career started with his affiliation with the 'Ndrangheta, supported by important bosses such as Piromalli, Paolo De Stefano, and Mammoliti. Cutolo based his organisation of the NCO on the model of the 'Ndrangheta, its internal codes and rituals.

The NCO strongholds were the towns to the east of Naples, such as Ottaviano, and Cutolo appealed to a Campanian rather than Neapolitan sense of identity, perhaps as a result of his poor peasant background. For instance, Cutolo is once reported as having said: "The day when the people of Campania understand that it is better to eat a slice of bread as a free man than to eat a steak as a slave is the day when Campania will win".

The organisation was unique in the history of the Camorra in that it was highly centralised and possessed a rudimentary form of ideology. For example, he publicly declared that children were not to be kidnapped or mistreated and allegedly arranged the assassination of at least one kidnapper. Perhaps the most potent ideological weapon was the cult of violence, which sometimes bordered on a kind of death wish, as Cutolo once wrote: "the value of a life doesn’t consist of its length but in the use made of it; often people live a long time without living very much. Consider this, my friends, as long as you are on this earth everything depends on your will-power, not on the number of years you have lived."

Through his book of thoughts and poems, Poesie e pensieri and his many interviews with journalists, Cutolo was able to create a strong sense of identity among his members. The book was published in Naples in 1980, but never distributed to the public. The book, containing 235 pages of poems and pictures, was seized by the police and censored as an "apology of a criminal organization". According to the Justice department, this book was viewed by NCO members as the "Bible of the NCO" and was particularly popular in prison, due to Cutolo's own distribution by mail. Even though his book was impounded by magistrates within days of its publication, many prisoners, alienated from society both inside and outside jail, wrote to Cutolo and other NCO leaders asking for a copy. Its possession alone would later be considered incriminating evidence.

Cutolo openly supported the young inmates, who were confronted with abuse, brutality, physical aggression and rape. He provided them with advice and protection from the brutalities of other inmates. At the same time they learned how to behave as a good picciotto, the lowest entry level into the Camorra. Cutolo challenged the old Camorra bosses and gave the youngsters a structure to belong to: "The new Camorra must have a statute, a structure, an oath, a complete ceremony, a ritual that must excite people to the point that they would risk their lives for this organization". Cutolo was revered by his soldiers. They called him Prince and kissed his left hand as if he were a bishop.

Cutolo spent a great amount of time researching the 19th century Camorra and reconstructed the old Camorristic ritual of initiation. He took great care in making the ritual a binding social practice. In his cell, he created a ceremony in which the initiate received the award of the primo regalo ("first gift"), also called abbraccio ("embrace") or fiore ("flower"). He infused the old Camorristic traditions with Catholicism and reconstituted the ritual of initiation of the traditional Camorra.

== Sister running the business ==
In Poggioreale, where on average there were 25 prisoners to a cell, Cutolo managed to obtain a cell to himself with a shower, while Giovanni Pandico, his own personal cook and underwriter occupied the cell next door so that he could serve dishes on request. When he was transferred to a smaller penitentiary (where his cell was carpeted, and fitted with a colour television and sound system) in Ascoli Piceno, he requested that Pandico follow him, and his request was promptly granted by the prison authorities. Cutolo referred to the prison as "the state of Poggioreale" and is once reported to have stated, "I am the king of the Camorra. I take from the rich and give to the poor." As a prisoner, he dressed impeccably with ties and designer shirts, a gold watch and shoes of crocodile skin. His daily meals consisted of lobster and champagne.

The Justice Department found out that between 5 March 1981 and 18 April 1982, Cutolo received money orders for an amount of 55,962,000 lire (the equivalent in 1982 of $55,000) to take care of his daily expenses, of which he reportedly spent half (30,600,000 lire or $29,000) on food and clothes. As Cutolo spent most of his time in prison from where he sent out his instructions, the everyday running of the enterprise was entrusted to his elder sister Rosetta Cutolo. Her nickname was "Occh'egghiaccio", meaning Ice Eyes.

Rosetta, a grey-haired, pious-looking woman, lived alone for years, tending her roses. She ruled in the Castle Mediceo, the headquarters of the organisation: a vast 16th-century palace with 365 rooms and a large park with tennis courts and swimming pool. The castle was bought for several billion lire, and provided direct contact for Cutolo from the prisons of Poggioreale and Ascoli Piceno. Brilliant with figures, Rosetta Cutolo negotiated with South American cocaine barons, narrowly failed to blow up a police headquarters and was glamorised in a film, The Professor.

After her plan to blow up a police headquarters narrowly failed, her stronghold was raided; Cutolo escaped under a rug in a car driven past checkpoints by the neighbourhood priest. She then went underground, remaining at liberty for the next 10 years. In 1993 she gave herself up and was charged only with mafia association: prosecutors alleged she had been running her brother's organisation. She was acquitted nine times of murder. Rosetta had persuaded the authorities she was harmless, which was helped by her frumpy image.

However, Raffaele Cutolo has always maintained that Rosetta knew nothing of his criminal activities and did only what he asked: "Rosetta has never been a Camorrista... She only listened to me and sent me a few suitcases of money to prisoners like I told her to". Nevertheless, it is clear that Cutolo had always wanted to maintain a male-only organization based on principles such as criminal fraternity and so could never be seen giving a role to his sister. It could be argued that he did not want to implicate her and therefore, always insisted that she was innocent.

Moreover, many important members did not believe that she held an important role because she was a woman. For instance, former NCO lieutenant and pentiti, Pasquale Barra argued: "What has Rosa Cutolo got to do with it? What have woman got to do with the Camorra?".

Raffaele Cutolo decided to expand the Camorra to Apulia. The outcome was not what he had planned. At first local criminals were managing the illegal trades while the Camorra lent financial resources and support demanding 40% of all profits derived from illegal activities. This arrangement proved to be an unstable one: soon the local criminals tried to free themselves from the masters. In 1981, one of them, Giuseppe Rogoli, founded the Sacra Corona Unita, a new Mafia invoking the regional Pugliese identity against the intrusion of the foreign Neapolitans.

== Nuova Camorra Organizzata–Nuova Famiglia feud ==
NCO-NF feud
Date	1970s-1993
Location	Campania
Result	NF victory

Belligerents
Nuova Camorra Organizzata	Nuova Famiglia

The NCO spread in the crisis-ridden Campanian towns of the late 1970s, offering alienated youths an alternative to a lifetime of unemployment or poorly paid jobs. Hundreds of young men were employed as enforcers. Initially, the main specialisation of NCO gangs was extorting money through protection rackets from local businesses. While the traditional Camorristic families held territorial powers and the consequent responsibility over their controlled areas, the NCO had no qualms over breaking the established social fabric by extorting shopkeepers, small factories and businesses, and building contractors. In its quest for cash, it even targeted individuals such as landlords, lawyers and professionals. The NCO's protection racket even included a transient circus.

The NCO later branched out to cocaine trafficking, partly because it was less subject to police investigation than heroin, but also because the Sicilian Mafia was less involved in the cocaine trade.

At the end of the 1970s two different types of Camorra organisations were beginning to take shape. On one side there was Cutolo's NCO, which dealt mainly in cocaine and protection rackets, preserving a strong regional sense of identify. On the other side, the business-oriented Camorra clans linked to the Sicilian Cosa Nostra like the clans of Michele Zaza and Lorenzo Nuvoletta, who dealt in cigarettes and heroin, but soon moved on to invest in real estate and construction firms.

Cutolo's NCO became more powerful by encroaching and taking over other group's territories. The NCO was able to break the circle of traditional power held by the families. Cutolo's organisation was too aggressive and violent to be resisted by any individual families. Other Camorra families initially were too weakened, too divided, and simply too intimidated by the NCO. He requested that if other criminal groups wanted to keep their business, they had to pay the NCO protection on all their activities, including a percentage for each carton of cigarettes smuggled into Naples. This practice came to be known as ICA (Imposta Camorra Aggiunta, or Camorristic Sale Tax), mimicking the state VAT sale tax IVA (Imposta sul Valore Aggiunto). For instance, Michele Zaza, the biggest Neapolitan cigarette smuggler, was reported to have paid the NCO more than 4 billion lire in the first three months after the imposition of the racket. In that same time, due to alleged insanity tests shown to the Neapolitan judges, Cutolo was found "not liable" for his delicts and as consequence, was confined at psychiatrist prison in which he escaped in February 1978. Cutolo was running until his arrest on 15 May 1979 at Albanella, province of Salerno and jailed again at Poggioreale prison

However, no hierarchy between Camorra gangs or stable spheres of influence had been created, and no gang leader was likely to agree to be subdued by Cutolo without making a fight of it. In 1978, Zaza formed a 'honourable brotherhood' (onorata fratellanza) in an attempt to get the Sicilian mafia-aligned Camorra gangs to oppose Cutolo and his NCO, although without much success. A year later, in 1979, the more successful Nuova Famiglia was formed to contrast Cutolo's NCO. It consisted of various powerful and charismatic Camorra clan leaders from the areas around Naples, such Carmine Alfieri of Saviano, Pasquale Galasso of Poggiomarino, Mario Fabbrocino of the Vesuvius area, the Nuvoletta clan of Marano, Antonio Bardellino from Casal di Principe (patriarch of the so-called "Casalesi") and Michele Zaza, known as o Pazzo or the Madman from Portici who made France his base of operations. From 1980 to 1983 a bloody war raged in and around Naples, which left several hundred dead and severely weakened the NCO. Between 16 and 19 June 1983, police arrested a thousand members of the NCO.

== Cirillo kidnapping ==
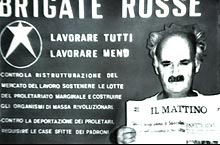
Cirillo (pictured) during his kidnapping by the Red Brigades

Cutolo was instrumental in obtaining the release of Ciro Cirillo, the Christian Democrat member of the regional government of Campania (assessore) in charge of Urban Planning, who had been abducted by the Red Brigades in April 1981. He was released within three months because, so rumour has it, the Christian Democrats paid Cutolo to use his influence with the Red Brigades.

Publicly the Christian Democrats had refused to negotiate with terrorists, but privately leading politicians and members of the secret services visited Cutolo in prison and asked him to negotiate with imprisoned members of the Red Brigades. A large ransom was paid to win Cirillo's release. In return, Cutolo allegedly asked for a slackening of police operations against the Camorra, for control over the tendering of building contracts in Campania (a lucrative venture since Campania was hit by a devastating earthquake in November 1980) and for a reduction of his own sentence – as well as new psychiatric test to show that he is not responsible for his actions. Both these last concessions were granted.

== Decline ==
Raffaele Cutolo beside his wife Immacolata at the Ascoli Piceno prison, c. 1982

Cutolo overplayed his hand in the Cirillo affair. His former political protectors turned and provided their support to his main rival Carmine Alfieri. When his main 'military' chief, Vincenzo Casillo, was killed in January 1983 by the allies of Alfieri, it was clear Cutolo had lost the war. His power declined considerably. Not only Cutolo but many other Camorra gangs understood the shift in the balance of power caused by the death of Casillo. They abandoned the NCO and allied themselves with Alfieri. His sister who ran the business was arrested in 1993. He was moved to a prison on the island Asinara, far away from Naples and his ability to communicate with the outside was severely restricted when the harsh 41-bis prison regime was imposed upon him.

In 2005, he asked for clemency in a letter to the Italian President. "I am tired and ill. I want to spend my last years at home." In 1983 he married Immacolata in prison. The couple never consummated their marriage. A six-year legal battle allowed Cutolo the right to father a child, Denise, through artificial insemination.

Cutolo had previously had a son, Roberto, from a previous marriage who was shot dead in Tradate on 24 December 1990, aged 28, in gang violence. His killers were later found dead, their faces riddled with bullets. The murder had been ordered by Mario Fabbrocino, the boss of the Fabbrocino clan, as revenge for Cutolo ordering the death of his brother, Francesco, in the 1980s. Fabbrocino was eventually convicted of Roberto's murder and sentenced to life imprisonment in 2005.

== Personality ==
Cutolo thought of himself as a predestined man with supernatural powers, able to heal the wounded and raise the dead. Various psychiatric examinations assessed him to be psychotic, hysteric and a megalomaniac. He thought that he had been sent to earth to save the Neapolitan people. As he said during a trial in 1980:

I saw four knights with lance and buckler, black capes around their shoulders. They saw me and smiled. At that moment I understood that I was given the task of rebuilding the Camorra on new and more efficient bases, so that the tradition of our fathers would not be lost. I am the reincarnation of the most glorious moments of the Neapolitan past, I am the messiah for the suffering prisoners, I dispense justice, I am the only real judge who takes from the usurers and gives to the poor. I am the true law, I do not recognize the Italian justice.

During a psychiatric evaluation, Cutolo claimed to have revived his aunt when he was eighteen. One night she had entered into what had appeared to be an irreversible coma. Cutolo went close to her and said: "Get up! We don't have the money for your funeral." She then got up. According to Adriano Baglivo of the Corriere della Sera, the old lady came back to consciousness due to the emergency care of a physician familiar with her history of catatonic attacks. However, for Cutolo this episode assumed the character of a miracle and sign of his inner powers.

When Valerio Fioravanti, a neo-fascist and fellow Poggioreale inmate sentenced for political terrorism asked Cutolo the reason for his charisma, he replied: "Naples is divided into lords and beggars. If I have charisma, it is because I can offer a prompt promotion from the second category to the first one."

In prison, Cutolo received a significant amount of fan mail from youth who were impressed with his achievements as well as his ability to outsmart the authorities. Generally viewing themselves as marginal and exploited, they were attracted by his notoriety, flamboyant personality and charisma. For instance, a letter from two teenage girls from Acerra which were intercepted by prison authorities read as follows:

Seeing that it is difficult for us to find somebody who can understand, and having watched your interview on television, we thought of explaining our situation to you, a person whom we truly admire... We don't like this society and soon we will go to Milan and we will live there and become successful, giving a lesson to the people of this dirty country.

During an interview with the media, Cutolo reminisced about his life:

I don't regret anything about my life. Crime is always a wrong move. It's true. However, we live in a society that is worse than criminality. Better to be crazy than to be a dreamer. A crazy man can be returned to reason. For a dreamer, he can only lose his head. A camorrista must be humble, wise and always ready to bring joy where there is pain. Only thus will he become a good camorrista before God. I am far from being a saint. I've made people cry, and I've done harm to those who wanted to harm me, making me cry. A camorrista is one who declares himself by his lifestyle. He who errs dies.

== Death ==
On 17 February 2021, Cutolo died in the prison unit of the Maggiore Hospital in Parma, at the age of 79.

== Biography and film ==
- (in Italian) Marrazzo, Giuseppe (1984/2005). Il camorrista. Vita segreta di don Raffaele Cutolo, Naples: Tullio Pironti. ISBN 88-7937-331-5.
- The Professor (1986), directed by Giuseppe Tornatore. Vaguely inspired by the real story of Cutolo. Cutolo is played by Ben Gazzara, with the Italian voiceover done by Italian actor Mariano Rigillo.
- The story of Raffaele Cutolo inspired one of the most famous songs of Fabrizio De André, entitled "Don Raffaé (Clouds of 1990)".

== Sources ==
- Allum, Felia (March 2000). The Neapolitan Camorra: Crime and politics in post-war Naples (1950-92) (PDF) (Thesis). Brunel University.
- Allum, Felia (2007). "Doing it for themselves or standing in for their men? Women in the Neapolitan Camorra (1950-2003)". In Fiandaca, Giovanni (ed.). Women and the Mafia: Female Roles in Organized Crime Structures. New York: Springer. pp. 9–17. ISBN 978-0-387-36537-4.
- Behan, Tom (1996). The Camorra. London/New York: Routledge. ISBN 0-415-09987-0.
- Dickie, John (2013). Mafia Republic. Italy's Criminal Curse: Cosa Nostra, Camorra and 'Ndrangheta from 1946 to the present. London: Sceptre. ISBN 978-1-444-72640-4.
- Haycraft, John (1987). The Italian Labyrinth: Italy in the 1980s. Harmondsworth: Penguin Books. ISBN 0-14-006918-6.
- Jacquemet, Marco (1996). Credibility in Court: Communicative Practices in the Camorra Trials. Cambridge: Cambridge University Press. ISBN 0-521-55251-6.
- Sciarrone, Rocco (1998). Mafie vecchie, mafie nuove: Radicamento ed espansione (in Italian). Rome: Donzelli Editore. ISBN 88-7989-435-8.
- Stille, Alexander (1995). Excellent Cadavers. The Mafia and the Death of the First Italian Republic. New York, NY: Pantheon. ISBN 0-679-42579-9.
- Tremblay, Richard Ernest; Hartup, Willard W.; Archer, John (2005). Developmental origins of aggression. New York, NY: Guilford Press. ISBN 1-59385-110-3.
