= Kidnapping of Ciro Cirillo =

1981 kidnapping by the Red Brigates

Ciro Cirillo
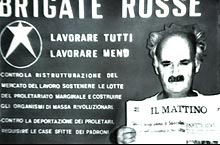
- Cirillo, photographed during his kidnapping by the Red Brigades
- Born: 15 February 1921; Naples, Kingdom of Italy
- Died: 30 July 2017 (aged 96); Torre del Greco, Italy
- Occupation: Politician
- Known for: Being kidnapped by the Red Brigades

On 27 April 1981, the Red Brigades (BR) kidnapped the 60-year-old Christian Democrat (DC) politician Ciro Cirillo and killed his two-man escort in the garage of his Naples apartment building. At the time, Cirillo directed reconstruction efforts in Campania devastated by the earthquake in the Irpinia region on 23 November 1980. He was released after a controversial deal with the Camorra; they did not negotiate with the BR and only asked them to release him. This happened several years after the Italian state had refused to negotiate with the BR in their kidnapping and murder of Aldo Moro, leading observers and critics to wonder what changed and the reasons behind the state's negotiation. Cirillo died in 2017.

== Natural target ==
Cirillo was a key figure in the Campanian regional DC hierarchy. He was the right-hand man of Antonio Gava, who was one of the national leaders of the Doroteo faction of the DC, responsible for appointments and public works contracts, and someone who knew a great deal about all the behind-the-scenes deals of local Neapolitan politics. As the regional councillor for urban planning, he was in charge of the reconstruction after the 1980 earthquake. Cirillo was therefore seen as a natural target for the Neapolitan column of the BR led by Giovanni Senzani.

After two and a half months, the BR threatened to execute Cirillo unless the Naples city government accepted demands it had refused in the past. The BR demanded that the authorities requisition housing for thousands of Naples families left homeless by the earthquake. They also demanded increased benefits for the unemployed. None of the political demands of the BR were met and in the end they accepted that a ransom was enough to release Cirillo.

== Release ==
Cirillo was released after 89 days on 25 July 1981, against the payment of a ransom of one and a half billion lire, thanks to the decisive intervention of Camorra boss Raffaele Cutolo. Publicly, the DC had refused to negotiate with terrorists, but privately leading politicians such as Antonio Gava and Vincenzo Scotti, and members of the secret services, such as Pietro Musumeci, visited Cutolo in prison and asked him to negotiate with imprisoned members of the Red Brigades.

In return, Cutolo allegedly asked for a slackening of police operations against the Camorra, for control over the tendering of building contracts in Campania (a lucrative venture since the devastating earthquake in November 1980) and for a reduction of his own sentence, as well as a new psychiatric test to show that he is not responsible for his actions. Both these last concessions were granted.

== Aftermath ==
The outcome of the Cirillo kidnapping stood in sharp contrast to the kidnapping of the Italian former prime minister Aldo Moro. When Moro was abducted by the BR in 1978, the DC-led government immediately took a hardline position: the "state must not bend" on terrorist demands. They refused to negotiate with the BR, while local DC members in Campania made every effort and even negotiated with criminals to release Cirillo, a relatively minor politician in comparison with Moro.

=== Death ===
Cirillo died on 30 July 2017, at the age of 96.

== See also ==
- List of kidnappings (1980–1989)
- List of solved missing person cases (1980s)

== Bibliography ==
- Allum, Percy; Allum, Felia, The resistible rise of the new Neapolitan Camorra, in Stephen Gundle and Simon Parker (eds) (1996), The New Italian Republic. From the Fall of the Berlin Wall to Berlusconi, New York: Routledge ISBN 0-415-12161-2.
- Behan, Tom (2002), See Naples and Die: The Camorra and Organized Crime, London/New York: I.B. Tauris Publishers, ISBN 1-86064-783-9.
- Haycraft, John (1985). The Italian Labyrinth: Italy in the 1980s, London: Secker & Warburg.
- Stille, Alexander (1995). Excellent Cadavers. The Mafia and the Death of the First Italian Republic, New York: Vintage ISBN 0-09-959491-9.
