= Nuova Famiglia =

Former confederation of Camorra clans

- Founded: Late 1970s
- Founded by: Various Camorra's bosses
- Founding location: Campania, Italy
- Years active: 1970s–1990s
- Territory: All Campania and the cities of Rome, Ostia, Milan and Rimini in Italy. Presence also in South America.
- Ethnicity: Italian, mostly Campanian
- Membership (est.): unknown
- Criminal activities: Racketeering, murder, drug trafficking, extortion, kidnapping, prostitution, bootlegging, illegal gambling, bookmaking (Totonero 1980), waste management, robbery, weapons trafficking, construction management, money laundering and loan sharking
- Allies: Sicilian Mafia
- Rivals: Nuova Camorra Organizzata (defunct)

The Nuova Famiglia (Italian: "New Family") was an Italian Camorra confederation created in the late 1970s and headed by the most powerful Camorra bosses of the time, Carmine Alfieri, the Nuvoletta brothers, Michele Zaza, Luigi Giuliano and Antonio Bardellino, to face Raffaele Cutolo's Nuova Camorra Organizzata, and affiliated with the Sicilian Mafia.

== History ==
Originally called "Nuova Fratellanza Napolitana" (New Neapolitan Brotherhood), later rebaptized by the media as "Nuova Famiglia", was established in response to the expansion of Raffaele Cutolo's Nuova Camorra Organizzata (NCO) in Campania. The formation of the group was primarily led by Luigi Giuliano, who, despite his young age, possessed sufficient authority to organize opposition against Cutolo. Giuliano convened a meeting in a garage in the Forcella district, attended by approximately two hundred individuals, all committed to resisting NCO aggression. His decisive demeanor and persuasive arguments were instrumental in galvanizing even the most hesitant participants, thereby consolidating his position as the leader of the anti-Cutolo faction. Within weeks, Giuliano emerged as the head of the Nuova Fratellanza, establishing the organization as a direct competitor to the NCO.

Giuliano’s principal ally in this endeavor was Luigi Vollaro, known as "the Caliph", founder of the Vollaro clan from Portici, whose clandestine gambling operations provided financial and logistical support. Vollaro and the Giuliano clan formalized their alliance by creating a structured organization governed by its own statutes, aimed at countering Cutolo’s influence and preserving the autonomy of their illicit enterprises. Documentary evidence from trials against figures such as Mario Fabbrocino and members of the Giuliano clan attests to the violent confrontations between the Nuova Fratellanza and the NCO. These documents include correspondence from incarcerated affiliates, which frequently described ongoing hostilities and urged active participation in the conflict.

Beginning in 1980, additional families, including the Zaza clan, joined the original coalition. Initially neutral, the Zaza family eventually allied with the Nuova Fratellanza, influenced in part by their connections to the Sicilian Mafia, with which Cutolo had refused to establish ties. This expansion marked the consolidation of the Nuova Fratellanza as the main force against the Nuova Camorra Organizzata in Campania.

The confederation included:

- Michele Zaza, boss of the powerful Zaza clan, and affiliated with Cosa Nostra.
- Carmine Alfieri, head of the Alfieri clan from Nola.
- Lorenzo, Angelo and Ciro Nuvoletta, bosses of the Nuvoletta clan from Marano, close linked with the Cosa Nostra, specifically with the Corleonesi.
- Luigi Giuliano, boss of the Giuliano clan, from the historic centre of Naples.
- Antonio Bardellino, boss of the Casalesi clan, from San Cipriano d'Aversa also linked to Cosa Nostra.
- Michele D'Alessandro, head of the D'Alessandro clan from Castellammare di Stabia.
- Angelo Moccia, boss of the Moccia clan, from Afragola.
- Pasquale Galasso, head of the Galasso clan, from Poggiomarino.
- Valentino Gionta, boss the Gionta clan, from Torre Annunziata.
- Luigi Vollaro, head of the Vollaro clan from Portici.
- Umberto Ammaturo, responsible for the cocaine trafficking from South America to Campania.

== The war against Cutolo ==
The war that ensued between the Nuova Camorra Organizzata and the Nuova Famiglia caused a huge number of victims. This caused in turn a greater attention from the Italian police organizations, pushing Cosa Nostra to accommodate an agreement between the two warring clans, hopefully favouring the Nuova Famiglia, which included a lot of former allies.

In 1982, Alfieri and his ally, Pasquale Galasso decided to eliminate the senior NCO leaders, in revenge for the murder of his brothers during the war. In November 1982, the NCO's financier, Alfonso Ferrara Rosanova, was murdered. When his deputy and main 'military' chief, Vincenzo Casillo was killed via car bomb in January 1983 by Galasso, it was clear that Raffaele Cutolo had lost the war. His power declined considerably. Not only Cutolo but many other Camorra gangs understood the shift in the balance of power caused by the death of Casillo. They abandoned the NCO and allied themselves with Alfieri.

The elimination of the key NCO figures not only marked the end of the NCO's defeat as a political and criminal force, but also the rise of Carmine Alfieri and the NF who, by now, virtually unopposed, replaced them as the main contact of the politicians and businessmen in Campania as well as other criminal organizations. These chain of killings, including that of Cutolo's son, Roberto Cutolo who was shot dead by members of the Fabbrocino clan on 24 December 1990, aged 28, coupled with the incarceration of many of its members brought an end to the Nuova Camorra Organizzata.

== Internal war ==
After the defeat of Cutolo, war broke out among the anti-NCO coalition, in particular between the Nuvoletta clan from Marano and Antonio Bardellino at the end of 1983. With Carmine Alfieri siding with Bardellino’s Casalesi clan. The war culminated in the Torre Annunziata's massacre of August 1984, which left eight people killed and 24 wounded among the Gionta clan allied with Nuvoletta. After the massacre and the murder of Ciro Nuvoletta two months earlier, the balance of power shifted in favour of Alfieri and Bardellino.

== The end ==
On May 26, 1988, Antonio Bardellino was murdered by his right-hand man, Mario Iovine in his Brazilian home at Búzios, a beach side resort for the rich and famous in the State of Rio de Janeiro, as part of an internal feud within the Casalesi clan.

In 1992, Pasquale Galasso decided to turn state's evidence, becoming the most important pentito inside the Camorra organization. After him, Carmine Alfieri was arrested and following Galasso, also decided to cooperate with the state.

Lorenzo Nuvoletta, because of a serious illness, after a time in jail, was granted house arrest. He died on April 7, 1994, from liver cancer. Marking the end of the Nuova Famiglia.

== Historical leadership ==
=== Bosses ===
- 1970s-1985 - Luigi Giuliano, Antonio Bardellino, Michele Zaza, Lorenzo Nuvoletta, Carmine Alfieri
- 1985-1988 - Antonio Bardellino (murdered)
- 1988-1994 - Lorenzo Nuvoletta

== See also ==
- Nuvoletta clan
- Camorra
- Sicilian mafia
- Antonio Bardellino
- Nuova Camorra Organizzata
- Lorenzo Nuvoletta
- Carmine Alfieri
- Michele Zaza
