= Poggiomarino =

- Comune
- Comune di Poggiomarino
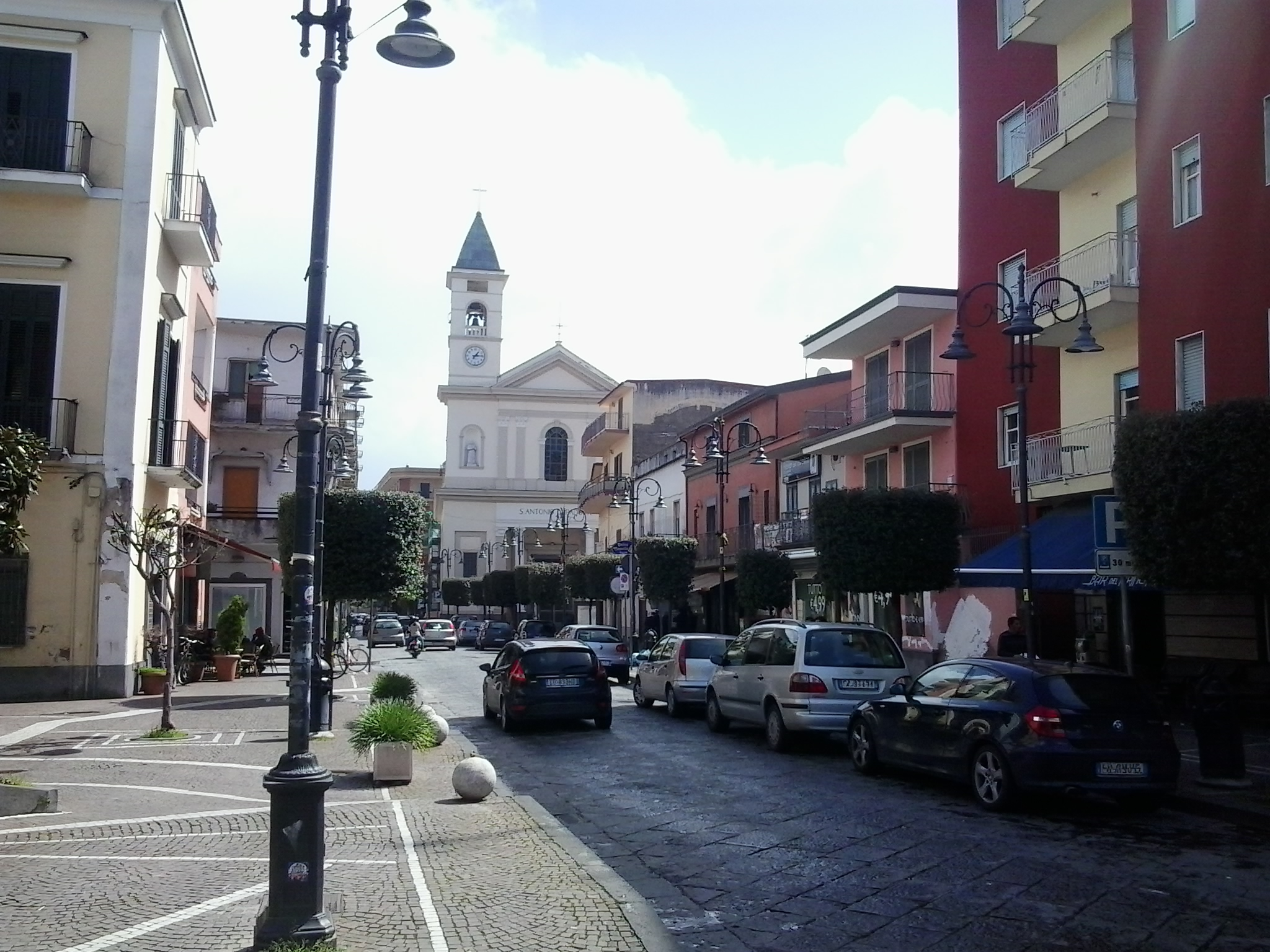

- Location within Italy Location within Campania
- Coordinates: 40°48′N 14°33′E
- Country: Italy
- Region: Campania
- Metropolitan city: Naples (NA)
- Frazioni: Flocco, Fornillo

Government
  - Mayor: Falanga Maurizio

Area
  - Total: 13.3 km^{2} (5.1 sq mi)
- Elevation: 47 m (154 ft)

Population (31 December 2010)
  - Total: 31,353
  - Density: 2,360/km^{2} (6,110/sq mi)
- Demonym: Poggiomarinesi
- Time zone: UTC+1 (CET)
  - Summer (DST): UTC+2 (CEST)
- Postal code: 80040
- Dialing code: 081
- Patron saint: St. Anthony of Padua
- Saint day: June 13
- Website: Official website

Poggiomarino is a comune (municipality) in the Metropolitan City of Naples in the Italian region Campania, located about 25 km (16 mi) east of Naples.

== History ==
Poggiomarino originated from the construction the canal "Conte di Sarno", begun in 1592, which would serve the lands of the Tuttavilla family by drawing waters from the Sarno river's springs. The work was completed in the late 17th century, and in the meantime a town had grown from the houses of the workers employed in the construction. Originally named "Taverna Penta", the borough changed his name to Podio Marino in 1738 when the area was acquired by the Genoese merchant Giacomo de Marinis. The population was also increased after the eruption of Vesuvio in 1631.

== Main sights ==
- Stilt houses, found during the construction of the canal and dating to the 2nd millennium BCE. It has been supposed that Pompeii was founded by the inhabitants of this prehistoric village before the 6th century BC.
- Church of SS. Rosario del Flocco (mid-18th century)
- Palazzo di Cristallo (Palazzo Nunziata, c. 1738), a minor example of the Vesuvian villas which characterize Campania.
- Villa Quinto, now in a poor state of conservation.
