= Pentito =

Italian term for criminals who became government collaborators

Tommaso Buscetta (with sunglasses), the first important pentito of the Sicilian Mafia, escorted into a court of law.

Pentito (Italian: [penˈtiːto], lit. 'repentant'; f. pentita, pl. pentiti) is a colloquial term to designate people known in Italian criminal procedure terminology as collaborators of justice (collaboratori di giustizia), i.e. former members of criminal organizations who decided to collaborate with a public prosecutor. The judicial category of pentiti was originally created in the 1970s to combat violence and terrorism during the period of left- and right-wing terrorism known as the Years of Lead. During the 1986–87 Maxi Trial and after the testimony of Tommaso Buscetta, the term was increasingly applied to former members of organized crime in Italy who had abandoned their organization and started helping investigators.

== Role and benefits ==
In exchange for the information they deliver, pentiti receive shorter sentences for their crimes, in some cases even freedom. In the Italian judicial system, pentiti can obtain personal protection, a new name, and some money to start a new life in another place, possibly abroad.

This practice is common in other countries as well. In the United States, criminals testifying against their former associates can enter the Witness Protection Program and be given new identities with supporting paperwork. The Italian Mafia bosses Buscetta and Francesco Marino Mannoia were allowed to live in the U.S. under new identities in the Witness Protection Program when Italy did not yet have such a program.

== Cases ==
Among the most famous Mafia pentiti is Tommaso Buscetta, the first important pentito. He was helpful to judge Giovanni Falcone in describing the Sicilian Mafia Commission or Cupola, the leadership of the Sicilian Mafia in the 1980s, and identifying the main operational channels that the Mafia used for its business.

In Italy, important successes were achieved with the cooperation of pentiti in the fight against terrorism (especially against the Red Brigades), by Carabinieri general Carlo Alberto Dalla Chiesa (who was later killed by the Mafia).

In the period until the 1990s, there were few, albeit significant, pentiti such as Tommaso Buscetta, Salvatore Contorno, Antonino Calderone, etc. However, this changed during the early 1990s. From 1992, over a thousand mafiosi have agreed to collaborate with Italian justice.

In some cases, pentiti have invented stories to obtain reductions in jail time. A famous case regarded the popular TV anchorman Enzo Tortora, who was falsely accused of cocaine trafficking and Camorra membership by a pentito named Giovanni Melluso. Tortora was detained for years before being cleared; he developed cancer and died soon after the case was finally solved, some say because of the emotional stress of his imprisonment.

=== Important pentiti of the Sicilian Mafia ===
- Leonardo Vitale (1941–1984) was the first to become a pentito in 1973, although originally his confessions were not taken seriously.
- Tommaso Buscetta (1928–2000) was the first high-profile pentito against the Sicilian Mafia. He started to collaborate with the anti-Mafia prosecutor Giovanni Falcone in 1984. His testimony was of crucial importance in the landmark Maxi Trial of 1986–87.
- Salvatore Contorno (born 1946) started to collaborate in October 1984, following the example of Buscetta.
- Leonardo Messina (born 1955), member of the San Cataldo clan, who became an informant in 1992. He was the greater accuser of Giulio Andreotti.
- Antonino Giuffrè (born 1945), boss of Caccamo and member of Corleonesi, turned informant in 2002, after his arrest.
- Antonino Calderone (1935–2013) started to collaborate in April 1987.
- Francesco Marino Mannoia (born 1951) started to collaborate in October 1989 because his brother had been murdered. He was the first pentito who used to belong to the winning faction of the Second Mafia War (1981–83).
- Giovanni Brusca (born 1957), the murderer of anti-Mafia prosecutor Falcone, began to collaborate in 1996.
- Santino Di Matteo (born 1954), became an informant in 1993 after his arrest; he offered information relating to the Capaci bombing. For this reason, his son Giuseppe was kidnapped, murdered and dissolved in acid.
- Salvatore Cancemi (1942–2011), another of Falcone's assassins, turned himself in to the Carabinieri in July 1993 and immediately began collaborating.
- Giuseppe Marchese (1963), Filippo Marchese's nephew, who became an informant in 1992.
- Gaspare Mutolo (born 1940), started to collaborate in prison in May 1992 and was the first mafioso who spoke about the connections between the Cosa Nostra and Italian politicians.

=== Other important pentiti ===
- Pasquale Barra (1942–2015), the first pentito and high-ranking member of Raffaele Cutolo's Nuova Camorra Organizzata.
- Pasquale Galasso (born 1955), former high-ranking member of the Nuova Famiglia faction of the Camorra.
- Carmine Alfieri (born 1943), former Boss of Bosses of the Nuova Famiglia.
- Carmine Schiavone (1943–2015), former high-ranking member of the Casalesi clan.
- Maurizio Abbatino, former boss of the Banda della Magliana.
- Felice Maniero (born 1954), former boss of the Mala del Brenta.

== Cultural acceptance ==
In some southern Italian communities, the Mafia has a significant presence, and in these areas, becoming a pentito is tantamount to a death sentence. Indeed, the Mafia family of Totò Riina based in the town of Corleone habitually extended the death sentence of the pentiti over to their relatives. For example, several of Tommaso Buscetta's close family members were killed in a long series of murders.

== Commentary on the term ==
It is often pointed out that the correct term should be collaboratori di giustizia, or "collaborators with justice". The word pentito implies a moral judgment that is considered inappropriate for the courts of justice to make.

== Criticism ==
In Italy, pentiti have come under criticism because of the favours they receive and because they would invent stories to receive benefits; they would invent stories to persecute people they do not like; their employment is seen as a reward for criminals, instead of a punishment; and they would be unreliable since they come from a criminal organization. Criticism comes most often from politicians, especially when they or an associate of theirs is under investigation for connections to the Mafia. It is therefore interpreted by some as an attempt to discredit one's own accusers, instead of a genuine preoccupation of the common citizen's civil rights. Luciano Violante, a politician and former president of the Italian Antimafia Commission, countered that "We do not find information about the Mafia among nuns."

Laws have been passed that bar pentiti from obtaining substantial benefits unless their revelations are later deemed new material, and lead to concrete results. The State can collect revelations only for six months after the initial intention to collaborate, after which they cannot be used in court. This has reduced the appeal of becoming a pentito since a single mafia associate does not know whether his knowledge will be useful to the prosecutors at the time of defection. Defection from the mafia in Italy has subsequently sharply reduced from the height reached in the early nineties, and the fight against mafia has reduced accordingly.

== See also ==
- Category:Pentiti
- Informant
- Turn state's evidence

== Bibliography ==
- Stille, Alexander (1995). Excellent Cadavers. The Mafia and the Death of the First Italian Republic, New York: Vintage ISBN 0-09-959491-9
