= Antonello Zappadu =

Italian reporter and publicist (born 1957)

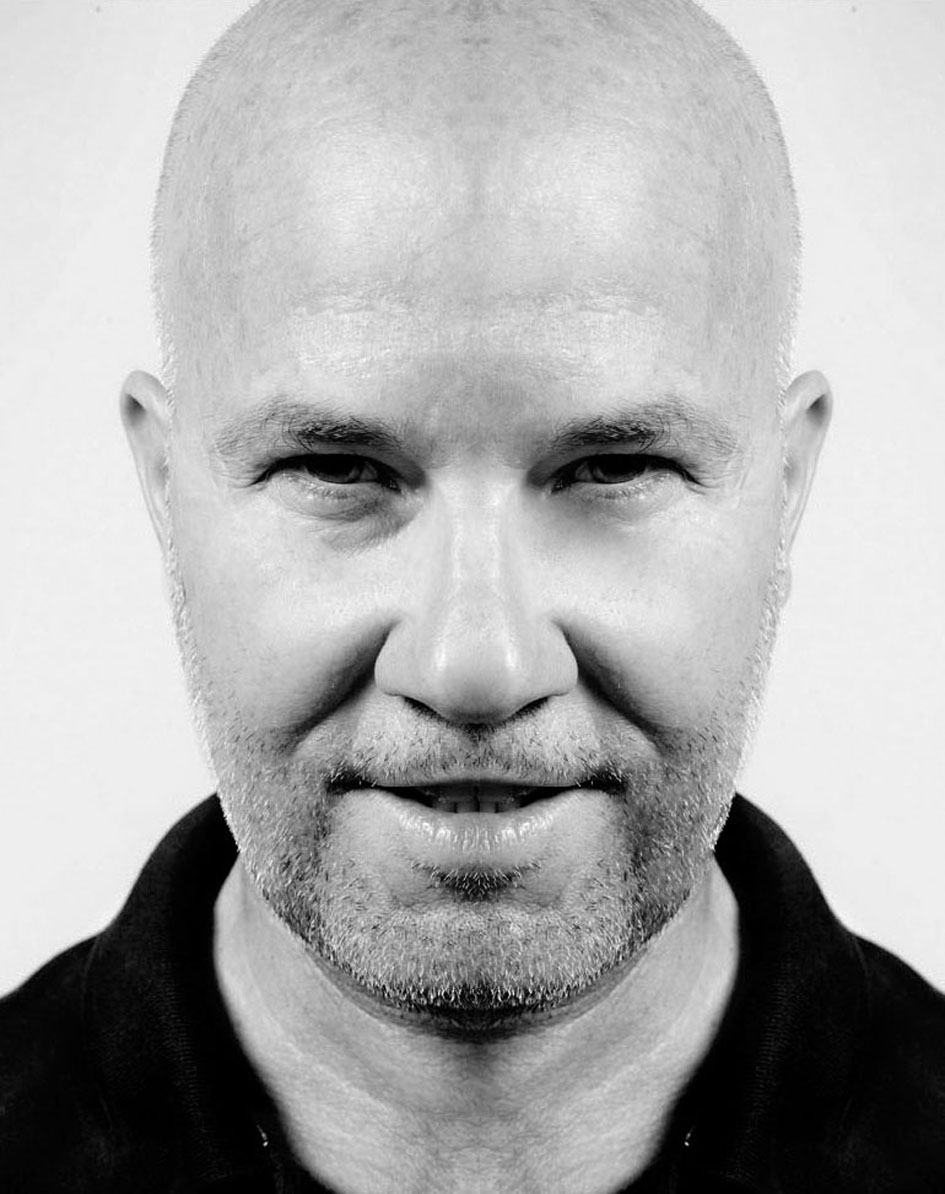
- Selfportrait
- Born: Antonello Zappadu; February 2, 1957; Pattada, Sardinia, Italy
- Occupation: Photoreporter
- Known for: Scandal of Villa Certosa
- Spouse: Susan Morales Céron
- Father: Mario Zappadu
- Website: www.zappadu.com

Antonello Zappadu (born February 2, 1957) is an Italian photo reporter and publicist, known for his important part in some events regarding Sardinian "bandits". Furthermore, he became famous having infiltrated the safety cover of Villa Certosa, at the time residence of Italian prime minister Silvio Berlusconi. He published some photos of the "Villa".

== Biography ==
Antonello Zappadu was born in Pattada, the son of Mario Zappadu, a journalist for RAI (Italian Public Television)., and brother of Salvatore, with whom he wrote his biography. He was married twice and has three sons, including well-known rapper Hell Raton. He worked for many press agencies, among them ANSA and E Polis. He has lived and worked in Colombia.

=== Age of Kidnapping ===
Zappadu began as an investigative reporter in the city of Olbia, near to Costa Smeralda. The area had high-rates of Sardinian banditry “anonima sarda”. He developed a database on the subject. He had contacts the criminal Graziano Mesina and collaborated with him to get the release of the young Farouk Kassam.

In 1996 in Barbagia region, he escaped an ambush. In 1997, during the kidnapping of Silvia Melis, through the request of a priest, his friend, delivered a message to the kidnappers. Therefore, the Public Prosecutor's Office of Lanusei charged him with aiding and abetting a kidnapping. Two years later the case was dismissed because he was declared innocent.

=== Villa Certosa pictures ===
In 2009 Zappadu tried to sell 700 pictures of then Prime Minister Silvio Berlusconi to Italian and foreign magazines, that he took stealthily at Berlusconi's residence Villa Certosa, at Porto Rotondo Country, and at the airport of Olbia, Costa Smeralda, on 4 separate days. The pictures portrayed the daily life in one of the most famous residences in the world at the time. Berlusconi hosted frequently heads of state such as Putin and Mubarak and famous businessman, like Flavio Briatore, the director of Forza Italia, his political party, and organized parties with the participation of escorts, mistresses and friends, like the well-known “papi girl” Noemi Letizia. The scandal arose because Zappadu in summer 2007 took a picture of the Italian premier sitting on a bank between two very young women. The magazine Oggi published these photos illustrating a broad report below the heading "The Berlusconi harem".

The "Villa", as official institutional residence, was covered by the official secret act. It is possible to see women in a thong and topless, and the Prime Minister of the Czech Republic, Topolánek, then President of the European Council, naked by a swimming pool, close to some women.

Furthermore, Zappadu documented the use of official government flights for friends, and the judiciary investigated Berlusconi. The scandal had interest in important English, North and South American, and even Chinese magazines, and naturally Czech newspapers, that gets a severe reaction of Nobel prize winner Saramago and Mario Vargas Llosa, who expressed his appreciation for the report.

==== Judicial dimension ====
In 2007, Zappadu was tried for trespassing and violation of privacy, in relation to the pictures sold to Oggi magazine. The first crime was dropped because no offence was committed (according to the report of the group Ros of Carabinieri); the second was passed the statute of limitation. In 2009 the 700 pictures were seized and the attorneys of Silvio Berlusconi denounced the reporter for unlawful entry, fraud and invasion of privacy. The first two charges were set aside, while according the statute of limitation for invasion of privacy had expired. On that occasion Zappadu declared that he didn't take just 700 pictures, but 5,000, taken between 2006 and 2009, and that they are in Colombia, free from legal proceedings.

In the summer of 2009, Emilio Fede, director of TG 4 news, criticisms of Zappadu led him to sue her for libel: following which, in 2016 Fede was sentenced. In 2011 further criminal proceedings were brought, because of the cover of L'espresso magazine: "Voi quorum, io Papi" (Quorum for you, I'm Dad). The judicial process goes on, but in 2018 Zappadu met Berlusconi

== Published works ==
- La Bamba (in Italian). Baldini&Castoldi Dalai Editore. 2012. ISBN 978-886073927-8.
- Cocaina, come si fa (in Italian). Ecoprensa/Panamericana. ISBN 978-889834019-4.
- Fabrizio De Andrè (in Italian). Logus Mondi Interattivi Editore. 3 March 2013. ISBN 978-889806220-1.
- U Clandistinu (in Italian). Mondo Nuovo Editore. 2018. ISBN 978-889428449-2.
- Vi presento Berluscolandia (in Italian). Edizioni Mondo Nuovo. 2019. ISBN 978-8832115017.

== Bibliography ==
- Zappadu: L'Incubo di Berlusconi (in Italian). Castelvecchi. 2009. ISBN 978-887615364-8.
- Papi. Uno scandalo politico (in Italian). Chiarelettere. 2009. ISBN 978-88-6190-063-9.

== See also ==
- Anonima sequestri
- Silvio Berlusconi
