= Giovanni Melluso =

Italian criminal (born 1956)

- Born: 1956 (age 69–70); Sicily, Italy
- Occupations: Police informant, former criminal
- Criminal charge: Armed robbery
- Criminal penalty: 16 years imprisonment (1978)

Giovanni Melluso (born 1956) is an Italian criminal. He became a significant informant against the Nuova Camorra Organizzata (NCO), a Camorra organization in Naples. He would be used by the Italian Justice Department to testify about the NCO's show business connections in Northern Italy, during the three-year-long trial against Cutolo's NCO which began in 1983. However, many of his accusations were later proven to be unfounded.

He is particularly infamous for the frame-up of the popular Italian talk show host, Enzo Tortora, whom he falsely accused of cocaine trafficking and NCO membership. Melluso was known by his multiple nicknames, "Gianni il Bello", or "Cha-cha-cha", both of which meant "handsome" (the latter expression having that meaning in the Southern Italy slang of the time).

== Biography ==
=== Criminal career ===
A native of Sicily, Melluso had migrated to Milan at the age of 18 in 1974. According to Melluso, Turatello had asked him to become a member of his organization. Melluso refused, only accepting work as an outside contractor dealing cocaine in the show-business world. Melluso rounded up the activity of drug dealer for Turatello, by working as a pimp and occasionally committing petty burglaries. During this period, he also adopted numerous false identities including Michele Tiano, Sante Breguglio, Mario Dalleri, Giuseppe Montalbano, Vincenzo Campo, and Paolo Belvisi. Melluso chose to operate in the Italian Riviera, and had a smooth operation running until the end of 1978, when he was arrested for armed robbery and sentenced to 16 years imprisonment. Subsequent sentences and comparisons with criminal of the caliber of Renato Vallanzasca and Angelo Epaminonda show that Melluso never actually met Turatello.

=== Becoming a pentito ===
After six years of rigorous imprisonment, Melluso decided to become a pentito. On March 2, 1984, when the preliminary hearings of the trial against the Nuova Camorra Organizzata (NCO) were already in motion, he asked to be transferred from his prison cell to the Carabinieri barracks. There, he declared to an investigating magistrate of his decision to change his life because he was tired of the prison conditions and also because one of his former associates, Andrea Villa, had already decided to collaborate and had involved Melluso in his testimony. In the long run, Melluso wanted a reduction of his prison sentence, in exchange for his testimony.

Upon becoming a pentito, Melluso was granted accommodation in the Carabinieri barracks, where he was treated more as a guest than as a prisoner. He received various visits from his wife, who reportedly became pregnant during this period. He was able to dress well, and enjoyed an easy life under the protection of the Carabinieri. Even when other pentiti had to return to their prison, Melluso was able to prolong his stay by timing the delivery of his information, in a skilled exchange of evidence for perks. When his brother was killed some time after his denunciation of the activities of the Turatello gang, Melluso used this fact as a bargaining chip to complain about and demand better security.

Giovanni Melluso was not a Neapolitan, did not live in Naples, and was not known as a Camorrista by the Justice department. Since he had always operated in Northern Italy, he did not have any intimate knowledge of the criminal underworld in Naples. He claimed to have only been an outsider in Turatello's business and to have never belonged to his organization. He also denied membership in the NCO. Unlike the other pentiti such as Pasquale Barra, Giovanni Pandico and Luigi Riccio, Melluso never admitted to any horrible crime. However, Melluso's repentance had some value for the Justice Department because it need some evidence to back its prosecutions of NCO's connections in the show business industry in Northern Italy. In court, Melluso proved to be a skillful performer, able to answer on cue, fend off attacks from the defense, and to animate his accounts with precise details and colourful anecdotes.

=== False testimony against Enzo Tortora ===
Italian talk show host, Enzo Tortora being led by the carabinieri during his 1983 arrest.

In 1983, the Justice Department had arrested some well-respected members of the Italian show business industry who had been above suspicion, thus attracting much needed public attention to the work of law-enforcement agencies in cracking down on Organized Crime. This move was inspired by the Justice department's perception that a drive against Organized Crime could only be successful if public opinion was focused on it, and therefore strove very hard to find any incriminating evidence against people able to attract media attention.

Giovanni Melluso was the chief witness against Enzo Tortora, perhaps Italy's most famous talk show host, who was falsely accused of receiving and selling over ten kilograms of cocaine on different occasions by people affiliated with the NCO. He became instrumental in helping the Justice department to substantiate its charges against Tortora, when he confessed to having had various encounters with Tortora in delivering him cocaine.

Melluso claimed that these dealings took place in 1976 in the streets of Milan, where both men lived. Later, towards the end of the same year, Melluso went to the office of an attorney, Cacciola, where he supposedly met Tortora and two other persons, whom he later identified as Roberto Calvi and Francesco Pazienza. According to Melluso, Tortora had a cosmetic case full of money which he showed to Calvi and Pazienza. After three hours of talk, the attorney Cacciola presented Tortora with a bag of cocaine and he handed it to Melluso to deliver it to Rome. Prior to his arrest in 1978, Melluso twice delivered cocaine to Tortora, 5 or 7 kilos the first time in a night club called Derby in Viale Monterosa, and the smaller package a second time in a public square, (Piazzale Loreto or Piazzale Corvetto). As evidence of his good relationship with Tortora, Melluso claimed to have had a photograph showing the two together, but to have destroyed it after Tortora's arrest in 1983.

Melluso's testimony was corroborated by seven other pentiti, among them, Giovanni Pandico, Luigi Riccio, Mario Incarnato, Pasquale Barra, etc. Based on these testimonies, Tortora was eventually convicted of cocaine trafficking and NCO membership in 1985 and sentenced to ten years in prison. Tortora was detained for 7 months before being cleared of all the charges by a court of cassation 4 years later in 1987. He developed cancer and died 1 year after the case was finally solved, some say because of the emotional stress of his imprisonment.

=== Testimony against other associates ===
In March, 1984, the Investigation Office of the Tribunal of Naples gave the Prosecution office of Milan, a copy of the statements made by Melluso concerning the alleged drug dealing activity of Walter Chiari, Patrizia Caselli and Antonino Cusumano. Melluso had made accusations against these people that were remarkably similar to those concerning Tortora: purchase and sale of considerable quantities of cocaine, giving a detailed account of the encounters with the two actors. On July 19, 1986, the investigating judge acquitted the three accused.

He motivated the sentence as follows:

"The enquiry has proved in a clear and evident way that the accusation is groundless. Melluso is deliberately lying when he accuses the above mentioned persons". Secondly, the preventive assiduity with other collaborators of the justice appears highly suspect, for the reasonable possibility of there being a mutual influence, and in the specific circumstance made evident by the fact that the first input to the investigation was provided precisely by that Andrea Villa whom Melluso refers to explain the reasons for his decision to cooperate with the justice."

=== Credibility in question ===
Giovanni Melluso's credibility as a witness has been disputed and undermined from the very beginning. He has been accused of lying on the witness stand in order to further his own importance and reliability as a witness. For instance, in the Enzo Tortora trial, many of the other pentiti who corroborated his accusations would later retract their statements.

The first was Mario Incarnato who stated that he was forced to accuse Tortora after nine months. Another pentito, Guido Catapano, wrote to Tortora in prison that he had shared the cell with Melluso for six months in the Campobasso penitentiary, and was well aware that the accusations made against him were slanders. He stated that Melluso had admitted to lying and that the only time he had seen Tortora was in a television show. He further stated that Melluso admitted to having been in Sicily at the time of the alleged meeting, and was afraid of being contradicted. Another pentito, Roberto Sganzerla wrote a similar letter confirming this fact. One of the principal witnesses against the NCO Pasquale D'Amico, also wrote to Tortora stating that Melluso was a big liar.

A pentito, Michele Tassini, who testified on May 14, 1986, before the Tribunal of Naples against the Giuliano gang, stated that Riccio, Incarnato and Melluso wanted him to make statements against Tortora to further their own statements and that it was Melluso himself who was more deeply involved in the affair. Yet another pentito, Salvatore Sanfilippo, begged forgiveness in a letter to Tortora. He stated that he was threatened with murder by Pandico, Melluso and the other pentiti, if he failed to back up their accusations. He was asked to say among many things that Tortora was plotting an attack against the Public Prosecutor, Diego Marmo, to be more credible in the reconfirmation of the accusations. Also, the judges of the Third Branch have mentioned that the pentiti themselves conjured up these accusations.

Furthermore, Melluso claimed to have given a kilogram of cocaine to Tortora between the end of 1975 and the beginning of 1976, which was simply impossible as Melluso was in the Sciacca prison from November 19, 1975, to April 6, 1976.

Melluso's association with Francis Turatello has also come under attack from many investigating magistrates as well as other pentiti. In the course of the debate of the fourth branch of the trial against the NCO, Roberto Sganzerla stated that Melluso was never a drug dealer working for Turatello. This was further corroborated on July 9, 1983, by Angelo Epaminonda, Turatello's successor who became a pentito after his arrest, and was considered to be extremely reliable by the magistrates of Milan.

=== New imprisonment ===
On July 24, 2012, Melluso was arrested due to a charge of pimping.
