= Attilio Cubeddu =

Sardinian bandit

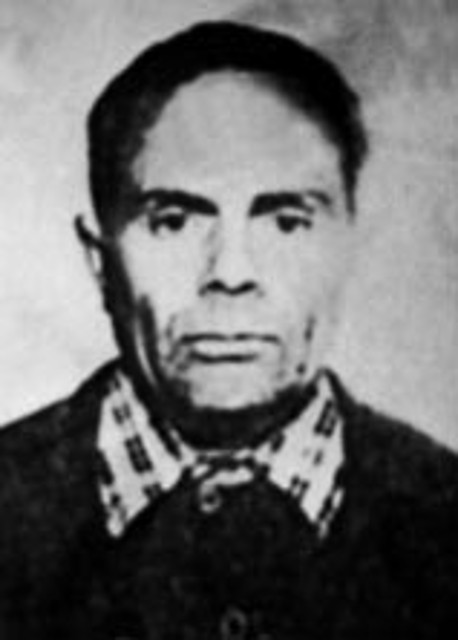
- Born: 2 March 1947 (age 79); Arzana, Sardinia, Italy
- Status: Fugitive
- Occupation: Kidnapper
- Allegiance: Anonima sarda
- Convictions: Murder, kidnapping

Attilio Cubeddu (Italian pronunciation: [atˈtiːljo kuˈbɛddu], Sardinian: [kuˈβeɖːu]; born 2 March 1947) is a criminal from Sardinia who was a member of Anonima sarda, a term used for bandits engaged in various kinds of crime in the island, in particular kidnapping, from the 1960s onward. Since 1997, he has been on the list of most wanted fugitives in Italy of the Ministry of the Interior since his escape from the prison of Badu 'e Carros in Nuoro, where he was detained for murder and kidnapping.

== Life ==
Born in Arzana, in the now Province of Ogliastra in Sardinia, he was known from an early age to the police for his criminal record. He took part in the kidnappings of Cristina Peruzzi in Montepulciano in 1981, and Ludovica Rangoni Macchiavelli and Patrizia Bauer in Bologna in 1983. He was arrested in April 1984 in Riccione and sentenced to 30 years in prison. In prison he behaved like a model prisoner, obtaining numerous premium leave permits. During one of these permits, granted in January 1997, he did not return to prison and went into hiding.

He subsequently was involved in the kidnapping in June 1997 of Giuseppe Soffiantini, a textile entrepreneur from Brescia (he was the guardian of the hostage) and the murder of the policeman Samuele Donatoni, crimes for which he was sentenced to life imprisonment and 30 years respectively in 2002. He was strongly suspected for the kidnapping of Silvia Melis in 1997, although he was never formally charged.

Since 1997, he has been on the list of most wanted fugitives in Italy of the Ministry of the Interior since his escape from the prison of Badu 'e Carros in Nuoro, where he was detained for murder and kidnapping. In 1998 investigations were extended internationally for his extradition.

It cannot be excluded that he may be dead, perhaps killed by Giovanni Farina, an accomplice in the kidnapping of Soffiantini, for not dividing the US$4 million ransom money that was paid in February 1998. However, in June 2012, L'Unione Sarda reported that he was seen in the Gennargentu mountains on Sardinia. According to investigators, the fugitive may enjoy the protection of family and friends.

He is not considered a protagonist of the Anonima sarda, but rather a low-level accomplice, without the revolutionary instinct or separatist claims of his partner in many raids, Giovanni Farina.
