= Paola Ferrari (journalist) =

Italian politician

- Born: Paola Francesca Ferrari; 6 October 1960 (age 65); Milan, Italy
- Occupations: Journalist; television presenter; politician
- Political party: The Right
- Spouse: Marco De Benedetti

Paola Francesca Ferrari (born 6 October 1960) is an Italian journalist, television presenter, and politician. She has been active on RAI since the 1990s, hosting its main sports programmes such as La Domenica Sportiva and 90º minuto.

== Television career ==
Ferrari made her television debut in 1977 as a switchboard operator on Portobello, hosted by Enzo Tortora. She was brought back for the second edition of the programme (1977–1978).

She then contributed as a sports journalist for the Telenova network in Milan, run by the Pauline Fathers, and wrote some articles on football for the magazine Intrepido. She performed some services for Domenica Sportiva on RAI in 1988, and was brought on with the company in 1992. In 1995 she joined Gianni Cerqueti on Dribbling, then switched to hosting Domenica Sportiva, from 1996 to 1999.

In 1999, Ferrari moved to TG2 Costume e Società; from that year to 2002 she hosted the nightly news edition, and beginning in 2000 she hosted the 13th edition of TG2. In 2002–2003 she presented Pole Position, in partnership with Amedeo Goria. For the 2003–2004 season, she was the lead of 90º minuto, becoming the first woman to hold that role, communicating directly with a group of opinion leaders (including Giorgio Tosatti) and male reporters. During the 2004 European Football Championship, she led the second evening of Rai 2's I figli di Eupalla, alongside Linus. She remained at 90º minuto for another season (2004–2005) until the programme ended along with Rai's rights to Serie A.

In 2005, Ferrari participated as a competitor in the inaugural series of Milly Carlucci's Ballando con le Stelle (the Italian version of the Dancing with the Stars franchise). She came back on for the next season, this time as a judge of the children's tournament. In the 2005–2006 season, she returned to Domenica Sportiva with Marco Mazzocchi and led the Dribbling Mondiale show for the 2006 FIFA World Cup. Since 12 September 2006, she has been hosting Rai 2's Martedì Champions, a programme that recounts and analyzes Tuesday's Champions League matches. Beginning in 2008 she also hosted Un mercoledì da campioni, another Rai programme dedicated to the Champions League, as well as Play Off Champions.

In 2010 she presented Notti mondiali from the Piazza di Siena in Rome, along with Giampiero Galeazzi and Maurizio Costanzo (whom Ferrari called "the odd couple"), in conjunction with Jacopo Volpi's Notti mondiali from Johannesburg. Also in 2010, she returned to Domenica Sportiva. From 8 June to 1 July 2012, she hosted Stadio Europa on Rai 1 and Rai 3. In September 2014, after having been replaced by colleague Sabrina Gandolfi on Domenica Sportiva, the media's attention was drawn to her dissatisfaction, as she entered into controversy with the new host and with Marco Mazzocchi.

In 2015–2016, Ferrari returned to 90º minuto after 10 years, this time with Marco Mazzocchi. The two also led the pre- and post-match shows for the 2016 European Football Championship. Since August, she has continued to host 90º minuto, this time with Alberto Rimedio and Mario Sconcerti.

== Politics ==
On 28 February 2008, Paola Ferrari became a candidate for the 15th electoral district (Lazio I) in the Chamber of Deputies in the general election, as a member of the Right party.

== Business activities ==
In 2014, Ferrari began her entrepreneurial career with a 33% stake in her friend Daniela Santanchè's Visibilia Pubblicità, a company active in the magazine publishing field through Visibilia Editore, of which she holds 5.4% and is vice president. In 2016, she left the company due to friction with Santanchè over management.

== Personal life ==
On 10 April 1997, Ferrari married Marco De Benedetti (son of Carlo De Benedetti), former managing director of Telecom Italia (TIM) and current head of the Carlyle Group in Italy. The couple have had two children, Alessandro and Virginia. She considers herself Roman Catholic.

In May 2014, Ferrari reported that she had undergone surgery to remove an infiltrating nodular carcinoma from her face.

== Awards and recognition ==
- In 1999, Ferrari received the Beppe Viola journalism award.
- In 2004, she received the Ussi-Coni Award for best sports journalist.
- In 2006, she was the first woman to win the Brera Prize for sports journalists, a recognition created to promote the teachings and memory of renowned journalist Gianni Brera, who died in 1992.
- In 2013, she was appointed an Honorary Member of the Centro Studi Culturale, a cultural project aimed at education in legality and active citizenship on the theme of integration.
- In 2016, she received the Moige Prize from the Chamber of Deputies and the Polizia di Stato.

== Television shows ==
- Portobello (Rai 2; 1977, 1977/78)
- Buon anno musica 1985 (Italia 1; 1985)
- L'Intrepido (Telelombardia; 1987)
- La Domenica Sportiva (Rai 3-Rai 2; 1996–1999, 2005–2006, 2010–2014)
- Dribbling (Rai 2; 1995)
- TG2 Costume e società (Rai 2; 1999)
- TG2 (Rai 2; 2000–2003)
- Pole Position (Rai 1; 2002–2003)
- 90º minuto (Rai 1; 2003–2005)
- I figli di Eupalla (Rai 2; 2004)
- Dribbling Mondiale (Rai 1; 2006)
- Ballando con le stelle (Rai 1; 2006)
- Martedì Champions (Rai 2; 2006–2010)
- Un mercoledì da campioni (Rai 2; 2008–2010)
- Notti mondiali (Rai 1; 2010)
- Stadio Europa (Rai 1, Rai 3; 2012)
- 90º minuto (Rai 2; 2015 – present)
- UEFA Euro 2016 (Rai 1, 2016)
