= Angel of Evil =

- Film poster
- Directed by: Michele Placido
- Written by: Carlo Bonini
- Produced by: Elide Melli
- Starring: Kim Rossi Stuart; Michele Placido; Filippo Timi; Paz Vega
- Cinematography: Arnaldo Catinari
- Music by: Davide Cavuti; Negramaro
- Distributed by: 20th Century Fox
- Release date: 17 December 2010
- Running time: 125 minutes
- Countries: Italy, France, Romania
- Language: Italian

Angel of Evil (Italian: Vallanzasca – Gli angeli del male, also known as Vallanzasca – Angels of Evil) is a 2010 Italian crime film directed by Michele Placido. It is based on the biography Il fiore del male. Bandito a Milano (The flower of evil. Bandit in Milan) of bank robber Renato Vallanzasca, by Italian journalist Carlo Bonini.

== Plot ==
Locked up in prison serving a life sentence for his crimes, an old Renato Vallanzasca (Kim Rossi Stuart) proceeds in the memories of a youth spent as head of a crime syndicate known as the chronicle Banda della Comasina, which raged in the 1970s in Milan between robberies, kidnappings, murders and evasions.

== Cast ==
- Kim Rossi Stuart as Renato Vallanzasca
- Filippo Timi as Enzo
- Paz Vega as Antonella D'Agostino
- Moritz Bleibtreu as Sergio
- Francesco Scianna as Francis Turatello
- Lia Gotti as Carmen
- Toni Pandolfo as Spaghettino
- Valeria Solarino as Ripalta Pioggia, aka Consuelo
- Lino Guanciale: Nunzio
- Nicola Acunzo: Rosario
- Gaetano Bruno: Fausto
- Paolo Mazzarelli: Beppe
- Matteo Palermo
- Gerardo Amato: Padre di Renato
- Lorenzo Gleijeses: Donato
- Adriana De Guilmi: Madre di Renato
- Federica Vincenti: Giuliana
- Stefano Chiodaroli: Armando
- Monica Bîrlădeanu as Nicoletta
- Riccardo Leonelli: Bruno, portantino

== Production ==
In 2008, 20th Century Fox showed a project of Renato Vallanzasca's movie to Michele Placido, proposing him to direct it. The director, initially uninterested, accepted the job only after being approached by Kim Rossi Stuart, who wanted to play the role of the protagonist. Placido spoke for the first time about it in a January 2009 interview, in which he announced his plans for the future, directing Vallanzasca and two other films.

== Release ==
=== Italy ===
20th Century Fox has taken care of Italian cinema distribution. Before being confirmed as the distribution company, the producers had thought of Medusa Film and Rai Cinema, but neither were interested in film studies and rejected the script. On 12 July 2010, Michele Placido said in a press release about the film that both houses had refused the rights acquisition because of the "hypocritical respectability" in Italy. Vallanzasca was originally planned to be theatrically released in Italy in October 2010, but 20th Century Fox delayed it a few months after, to 17 December.

=== U.S. ===
The film was released in the United States in 2011 with the title Angel of Evil.

== Reception ==
On Rotten Tomatoes, the film has a 52% rating based on reviews from 25 critics, and an average rating of 5.6/10. Metacritic assigned the film a weighted average score of 48 out of 100, based on 5 critics, indicating "mixed or average reviews".
