= Paola Ferrari =

Paola Ferrari may refer to:

- Paola Ferrari (basketball) (born 1985), Paraguayan basketball player
- Paola Ferrari (journalist) (born 1960), Italian journalist and politician

== See also ==
- 12840 Paolaferrari, a minor planet
