= Customary law =

Legal principle

A legal custom is the established pattern of behavior within a particular social setting. A claim can be carried out in defense of "what has always been done and accepted by law". Customary law (also consuetudinary or unofficial law) exists where:

1. a certain legal practice is observed and
2. the relevant actors consider it to be an opinion of law or necessity (opinio juris).

Most customary laws deal with standards of the community that have been long-established in a given locale. However, the term can also apply to areas of international law where certain standards have been nearly universal in their acceptance as correct bases of action – for example, laws against piracy or slavery (see hostis humani generis). In many, though not all instances, customary laws will have supportive court rulings and case law that have evolved over time to give additional weight to their rule as law and also to demonstrate the trajectory of evolution (if any) in the judicial interpretation of such law by relevant courts.

== Nature, definition and sources ==
A central issue regarding the recognition of custom is determining the appropriate methodology to know what practices and norms actually constitute customary law. It is not immediately clear that classic Western theories of jurisprudence can be reconciled in any useful way with conceptual analyses of customary law, and thus some scholars (like John Comaroff and Simon Roberts) have characterized customary law norms in their own terms. Yet, there clearly remains some disagreement, which is seen in John Hund's critique of Comaroff and Roberts' theory, and preference for the contributions of H. L. A. Hart. Hund argues that Hart's The Concept of Law solves the conceptual problem with which scholars who have attempted to articulate how customary law principles may be identified, defined, and how they operate in regulating social behavior and resolving disputes.

Customary law refers to the set of customs, practices, and beliefs that a community accepts as binding rules of conduct.

=== As an indefinite repertoire of norms ===
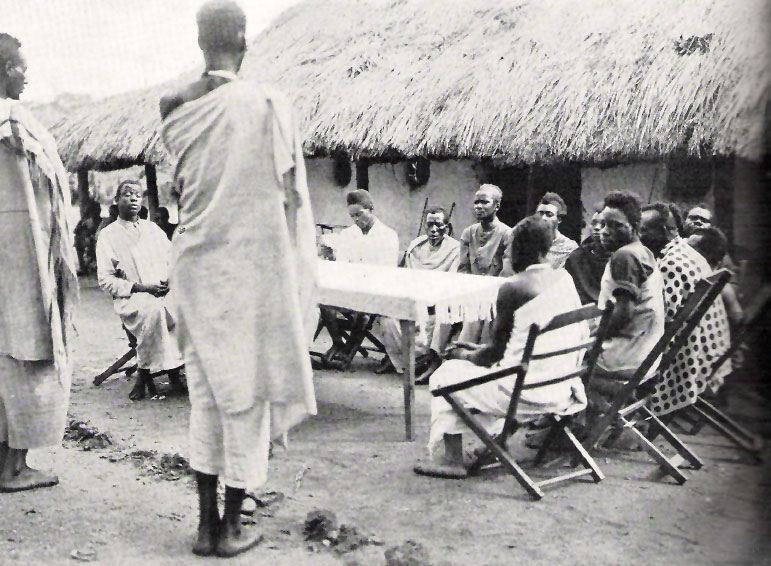
A court presided over by a customary chief in the Belgian Congo, c. 1942

Comaroff and Roberts' famous work, "Rules and Processes", attempted to detail the body of norms that constitute Tswana law in a way that was less legalistic (or rule-oriented) than had Isaac Schapera. They defined "mekgwa le melao ya Setswana" in terms of Casalis and Ellenberger's definition: melao therefore being rules pronounced by a chief and mekgwa as norms that become customary law through traditional usage. Importantly, however, they noted that the Tswana seldom attempt to classify the vast array of existing norms into categories and they thus termed this the 'undifferentiated nature of the normative repertoire'. Moreover, they observe the co-existence of overtly incompatible norms that may breed conflict, either due to circumstances in a particular situation or inherently due to their incongruous content. This lack of rule classification and failure to eradicate internal inconsistencies between potentially conflicting norms allows for much flexibility in dispute settlement and is also viewed as a 'strategic resource' for disputants who seek to advance their own success in a case. The latter incongruities (especially inconsistencies of norm content) are typically solved by elevating one of the norms (tacitly) from 'the literal to the symbolic. This allows for the accommodation of both as they now theoretically exist in different realms of reality. This is highly contextual, which further illustrates that norms cannot be viewed in isolation and are open to negotiation. Thus, although there are a small number of so-called non-negotiable norms, the vast majority are viewed and given substance contextually, which is seen as fundamental to the Tswana.

Comaroff and Roberts describe how outcomes of specific cases have the ability to change the normative repertoire, as the repertoire of norms is seen to be both in a state of formation and transformation at all times. These changes are justified on the grounds that they are merely giving recognition to de facto observations of transformation. Furthermore, the legitimacy of a chief is a direct determinant of the legitimacy of his decisions. In the formulation of legislative pronouncements, as opposed to decisions made in dispute resolution, the chief first speaks of the proposed norm with his advisors, then council of headmen, then the public assembly debate the proposed law and may accept or reject it. A chief can proclaim the law even if the public assembly rejects it, but this is not often done; and, if the chief proclaims the legislation against the will of the public assembly, the legislation will become melao, however, it is unlikely that it will be executed because its effectiveness depends on the chief's legitimacy and the norm's consistency with the practices (and changes in social relations) and will of the people under that chief.

Regarding the invocation of norms in disputes, Comaroff and Roberts used the term, "paradigm of argument", to refer to the linguistic and conceptual frame used by a disputant, whereby 'a coherent picture of relevant events and actions in terms of one or more implicit or explicit normative referents' is created. In their explanation, the complainant (who always speaks first) thus establishes a paradigm the defendant can either accept and therefore argue within that specific paradigm or reject and therefore introduce his or her own paradigm (usually, the facts are not contested here). If the defendant means to change the paradigm, they will refer to norms as such, where actually norms are not ordinarily explicitly referenced in Tswana dispute resolution as the audience would typically already know them and just the way one presents one's case and constructs the facts will establish one's paradigm. The headman or chief adjudicating may also do same: accept the normative basis implied by the parties (or one of them), and thus not refer to norms using explicit language but rather isolate a factual issue in the dispute and then make a decision on it without expressly referring to any norms, or impose a new or different paradigm onto the parties.

=== Law as necessarily rule-governed ===
Hund finds Comaroff and Roberts' flexibility thesis of a 'repertoire of norms' from which litigants and adjudicator choose in the process of negotiating solutions between them uncompelling. He is therefore concerned with disproving what he calls "rule scepticism" on their part. He notes that the concept of custom generally denotes convergent behaviour, but not all customs have the force of law. Hund therefore draws from Hart's analysis distinguishing social rules, which have internal and external aspects, from habits, which have only external aspects. Internal aspects are the reflective attitude on the part of adherents toward certain behaviours perceived to be obligatory, according to a common standard. External aspects manifest in regular, observable behaviour, but is not obligatory. In Hart's analysis, then, social rules amount to custom that has legal force.

Hart identifies three further differences between habits and binding social rules. First, a social rule exists where society frowns on deviation from the habit and attempts to prevent departures by criticising such behaviour. Second, when this criticism is seen socially as a good reason for adhering to the habit, and it is welcomed. And, third, when members of a group behave in a common way not only out of habit or because everyone else is doing it, but because it is seen to be a common standard that should be followed, at least by some members. Hund, however, acknowledges the difficulty of an outsider knowing the dimensions of these criteria that depend on an internal point of view.

For Hund, the first form of rule scepticism concerns the widely held opinion that, because the content of customary law derives from practice, there are actually no objective rules, since it is only behaviour that informs their construction. On this view, it is impossible to distinguish between behaviour that is rule bound and behaviour that is not—i.e., which behaviour is motivated by adherence to law (or at least done in recognition of the law) and is merely a response to other factors. Hund sees this as problematic because it makes quantifying the law almost impossible, since behaviour is obviously inconsistent. Hund argues that this is a misconception based on a failure to acknowledge the importance of the internal element. In his view, by using the criteria described above, there is not this problem in deciphering what constitutes "law" in a particular community.

According to Hund, the second form of rule scepticism says that, though a community may have rules, those rules are not arrived at 'deductively', i.e. they are not created through legal/moral reasoning only but are instead driven by the personal/political motives of those who create them. The scope for such influence is created by the loose and undefined nature of customary law, which, Hund argues, grants customary-lawmakers (often through traditional 'judicial processes') a wide discretion in its application. Yet, Hund contends that the fact that rules might sometimes be arrived at in the more ad hoc way, does not mean that this defines the system. If one requires a perfect system, where laws are created only deductively, then one is left with a system with no rules. For Hund, this cannot be so and an explanation for these kinds of law-making processes is found in Hart's conception of "secondary rules" (rules in terms of which the main body of norms are recognised). Hund therefore says that for some cultures, for instance in some sections of Tswana society, the secondary rules have developed only to the point where laws are determined with reference to politics and personal preference. This does not mean that they are not "rules". Hund argues that if we acknowledge a developmental pattern in societies' constructions of these secondary rules then we can understand how this society constructs its laws and how it differs from societies that have come to rely on an objective, stand-alone body of rules.

== Codification ==
The modern codification of civil law developed from the tradition of medieval custumals, collections of local customary law that developed in a specific manorial or borough jurisdiction, and which were slowly pieced together mainly from case law and later written down by local jurists. Custumals acquired the force of law when they became the undisputed rule by which certain rights, entitlements, and obligations were regulated between members of a community. Some examples include Bracton's De Legibus et Consuetudinibus Angliae for England, the Coutume de Paris for the city of Paris, the Sachsenspiegel for northern Germany, and the many fueros of Spain.

== International law ==
In international law, customary law refers to the Law of Nations or the legal norms that have developed through the customary exchanges between states over time, whether based on diplomacy or aggression. Essentially, legal obligations are believed to arise between states to carry out their affairs consistently with past accepted conduct. These customs can also change based on the acceptance or rejection by states of particular acts. Some principles of customary law have achieved the force of peremptory norms, which cannot be violated or altered except by a norm of comparable strength. These norms are said to gain their strength from universal acceptance, such as the prohibitions against genocide and slavery. Customary international law can be distinguished from treaty law, which consists of explicit agreements between nations to assume obligations. However, many treaties are attempts to codify pre-existing customary law.

== Constitutions ==
In constitutional studies, conceptual mixture of constitution and custom can exist in two different form. One is type of unwritten constitutional law established as custom, having same legal validity as written constitution, and even sometimes enforceable by court, called as customary constitution. Another is type of unwritten constitutional convention, having inferior legality than written constitution, and usually not enforceable by court, called as constitutional convention. Thus, customary law as constitutional law is mostly discussed as the former concept, constitutional customary law. Well known modern examples of this constitution comes from France (French: coutume constitutionnelle), and South Korea (Korean: 관습헌법; Hanja: 慣習憲法; RR: Gwanseup Heonbeop).

== Within contemporary legal systems ==
Customary law is a recognized source of law within jurisdictions of the civil law tradition, where it may be subordinate to both statutes and regulations. In addressing custom as a source of law within the civil law tradition, John Henry Merryman notes that, though the attention it is given in scholarly works is great, its importance is "slight and decreasing". On the other hand, in many countries around the world, one or more types of customary law continue to exist side by side with official law, a condition referred to as legal pluralism (see also List of national legal systems).

In the canon law of the Catholic Church, custom is a source of law. Canonical jurisprudence, however, differs from civil law jurisprudence in requiring the express or implied consent of the legislator for a custom to obtain the force of law.

In the English common law, "long usage" must be established.

It is a broad principle of property law that, if something has gone on for a long time without objection, whether it be using a right of way or occupying land to which one has no title, the law will eventually recognise the fact and give the person doing it the legal right to continue.

It is known in case law as "customary rights". Something which has been practised since time immemorial by reference to a particular locality may acquire the legal status of a custom, which is a form of local law. The legal criteria defining a custom are precise. The most common claim in recent times, is for customary rights to moor a vessel.

The mooring must have been in continuous use for "time immemorial" which is defined by legal precedent as 12 years (or 20 years for Crown land) for the same purpose by people using them for that purpose. To give two examples: a custom of mooring which might have been established in past times for over two hundred years by the fishing fleet of local inhabitants of a coastal community will not simply transfer so as to benefit present day recreational boat owners who may hail from much further afield. Whereas a group of houseboats on a mooring that has been in continuous use for the last 25 years with a mixture of owner occupiers and rented houseboats, may clearly continue to be used by houseboats, where the owners live in the same town or city. Both the purpose of the moorings and the class of persons benefited by the custom must have been clear and consistent.

In Canada, customary aboriginal law has a constitutional foundation and for this reason has increasing influence.

In the Scandinavian countries customary law continues to exist and has great influence.

Customary law is also used in some developing countries, usually used alongside common or civil law. For example, in Ethiopia, despite the adoption of legal codes based on civil law in the 1950s according to Dolores Donovan and Getachew Assefa there are more than 60 systems of customary law currently in force, "some of them operating quite independently of the formal state legal system". They offer two reasons for the relative autonomy of these customary law systems: one is that the Ethiopian government lacks sufficient resources to enforce its legal system to every corner of Ethiopia; the other is that the Ethiopian government has made a commitment to preserve these customary systems within its boundaries.

In 1995, President of Kyrgyzstan Askar Akaev announced a decree to revitalize the aqsaqal courts of village elders. The courts would have jurisdiction over property, torts and family law. The aqsaqal courts were eventually included under Article 92 of the Kyrgyz constitution. As of 2006, there were approximately 1,000 aqsaqal courts throughout Kyrgyzstan, including in the capital of Bishkek. Akaev linked the development of these courts to the rekindling of Kyrgyz national identity. In a 2005 speech, he connected the courts back to the country's nomadic past and extolled how the courts expressed the Kyrgyz ability of self-governance. Similar aqsaqal courts exist, with varying levels of legal formality, in other countries of Central Asia.

The Somali people in the Horn of Africa follow a customary law system referred to as xeer. It survives to a significant degree everywhere in Somalia and in the Somali communities in the Ogaden. Economist Peter Leeson attributes the increase in economic activity since the fall of the Siad Barre administration to the security in life, liberty and property provided by Xeer in large parts of Somalia. The Dutch attorney Michael van Notten also draws upon his experience as a legal expert in his comprehensive study on Xeer, The Law of the Somalis: A Stable Foundation for Economic Development in the Horn of Africa (2005).

In India many customs are accepted by law. For example, Hindu marriage ceremonies are recognized by the Hindu Marriage Act.

In Indonesia, customary adat laws of the country's various indigenous ethnicities are recognized, and customary dispute resolution is recognized in Papua. Indonesian adat law are mainly divided into 19 circles, namely Aceh, Gayo, Alas, and Batak, Minangkabau, South Sumatra, the Malay regions, Bangka and Belitung, Kalimantan, Minahasa, Gorontalo, Toraja, South Sulawesi, Ternate, the Molluccas, Papua, Timor, Bali and Lombok, Central and East Java including the island of Madura, Sunda, and the Javanese monarchies, including the Yogyakarta Sultanate, Surakarta Sunanate, and the Pakualaman and Mangkunegaran princely states.

In the Philippines, the Indigenous Peoples' Rights Act of 1997 recognizes customary laws of indigenous peoples within their domain.

== Customary legal systems ==
- Adat (Malays of Nusantara)
- Anglo-Saxon law (England)
- Aqsaqal (Central Asia)
- Australian Aboriginal customary law
- Ayllu (Andean peoples)
- Barbagian Code
- Basque and Pyrenean law
- Bedouin systems of justice
- Celtic law
- Constitutions of Melfi (Southern Italy)
- Coutume (France)
- Custom (Catholic canon law)
- Custumal (England)
- Early Germanic law
- Early Irish law (Ireland)
- Foral (Portugal)
- Fuero (Spain)
- Indigenous Australian customary law
- Kanun of Leke Dukagjini (Albania)
- Keyoh
- Kievan Rus' law
- Kris (Romani court) (Romani people)
- Law of the sea
- Laws of the Brets and Scots (Scotland)
- Medieval Scandinavian laws
- Merchant law
- Millet (Ottoman Empire)
- Mos maiorum
- Norman law
- Old French law
- Pashtunwali and Jirga (Pashtuns of Pakistan and Afghanistan)
- Rothbardian law
- Smriti and Ācāra of Classical Hindu law (India)
- Statutes of Lithuania
- Customary law (South Africa)
- Talmudic law
- Tikanga Māori
- Urf (Arab world/Islamic law)
- Ülüş system
- Cyfraith Hywel (Wales)
- Xeer (Somalia)
- Usages of Barcelona (Catalonia)
- Usos y costumbres (various regions of Latin America)
- Vlach law (Romania)
- Vyavahāramālā (Kerala)

== See also ==
- Indigenous law
