= New Movement =

New Movement Nuovo Movimento
- Leader: Nicola Grauso
- Founded: 24 July 1997
- Dissolved: December 2002
- Ideology: IT development

New Movement (Italian: Nuovo Movimento) was a political party active in Sardinia founded in 1997 by the entrepreneur Nicola Grauso.

The party had in its program of transformation of Sardinia into the world leader in the Internet.

== History ==
The New Movement was founded in 1997 by the entrepreneur Nicola Grauso, former creator of one of the first internet service providers in Italy, "Video On Line", with access points in every corner of the Italian province.

The movement was founded after a failed attempt by Grauso to relaunch, together with other Sardinian entrepreneurs, the important paper mill based in Arbatax, in Ogliastra, coming into conflict with the center-left regional government of Sardinia led by Federico Palomba. Grauso declared that the New Movement was neither on the right nor on the left.

However, to gather new members for the movement, Grauso used the e-mails of old "Video On Line" subscribers to ask them to join the party, thus violating 'netiquette'.

Grauso ran in 1998 for mayor of Cagliari with his party, against the outgoing centre-right mayor Mariano Delogu, obtaining about 10 percent of the votes.

In the 1999 Sardinian regional elections the New Movement appeared in the center-right coalition in support of Mauro Pili, obtaining two seats, including Grauso.

in December 2002 Grauso resigned from the position of regional councilor, motivating his decision with the need to directly follow the numerous judicial processes in which he was involved. With his resignation, the New Movement was definitively dissolved.

== Electoral results ==
=== Sardinian regional elections ===
Election year	# of overall votes	% of overall vote	# of overall seats won
1999	28,771	3.3	2 / 64
