= Kidnapping of Silvia Melis =

Kidnapping in Italy in 1997

- Location: Tortolì, Sardinia, Italy
- Date: 19 February 1997 – 11 November 1997
- Attack type: Kidnapping
- Victim: Silvia Melis
- Perpetrators: Antonio Maria Marini; Pasqualino Rubanu; Grazia Marine

The kidnapping of Silvia Melis was a kidnapping for extortion that took place in Ogliastra, Sardinia, Italy, in 1997. The fact is also known for the involvement of individuals such as Nicola Grauso, then editor of L'Unione Sarda, judge Luigi Lombardini, the director of L'Unione Sarda Antonangelo Liori and photojournalist Antonello Zappadu. The kidnapping lasted 265 days.

== History ==
On 19 February 1997, Silvia Melis, an entrepreneur and labor consultant from Tortolì and the daughter of a wealthy engineer, was kidnapped as she was returning home by car. The bandits took her away after having tied, blindfolded and gagged her, leaving her four-year-old son, Luca, in the car. On July 15, the negotiations with the kidnappers entered the final phase, but the meeting with the bandits for the payment of the ransom did not take place. Investigative photojournalist Antonello Zappadu was asked by a priest friend of his asked to deliver a message to the kidnappers. Melis was transferred to a tent for the last 74 days of her confinement, until she managed to free herself on 11 November and was found near Nuoro on the side of a provincial road by two plainclothes agents.

The Melis family claimed they did not pay any ransom. Nicola Grauso, an entrepreneur, revealed instead that he had paid the ransom for the liberation of the kidnapped girl in the Esterzili and Ulassai campaigns. The Cagliari judiciary denied that it was true, asserting that Silvia Melis would have freed herself. However, Grauso maintained his positions, ending up under investigation for attempted extortion against Tito Melis and for slander against the judges. It was suspected that fugitive Attilio Cubeddu was the organizer of the kidnapping, but so far his guilt has not been proven. Various hypotheses about the ransom followed, including that it been paid by SISDE, which the Minister of the Interior Giorgio Napolitano described as "just fantasies", until on 20 November when Tito Melis himself declared that he had paid the ransom himself, of which one billion lire was contributed by him, 400 million by Grauso and another billion by unspecified entities.

== Investigation ==
Melis told the investigators that she had been held captive in five different places, which were all later identified during the investigations except for one, a cave. On 29 May 1999, Antonio Maria Marini, his mother Grazia Marine, Pasqualino Rubanu and Andrea Nieddu were arrested. Witness Anna Maria Rubatta, a neighbor of Grazia Marine, told investigators that on the night of 5 June 1997, she had seen Marini and Rubanu leave the house in Nuoro with a hooded person. Rubatta later retracted the allegations by renouncing the protection program.

== Trials ==
In the trial of the kidnappers, conducted in the first instance and on appeal by judges Mauro Mura and Gilberto Ganassi, Marini, Grazia Marine and Rubanu were found guilty. During the first instance trial, on 4 June 2001, Marini was sentenced to 30 years in prison, Rubanu to 26 years and Grazia Marine to 25 years and six months; the fourth defendant, Nieddu, was acquitted for not having committed the crime.

The appeal process on 20 December 2002 overturned the sentence by acquitting all three defendants but a year later, on 23 October 2003, the Cassation annulled the second degree sentence by arranging a new appeal process. In the bis appeal process, Marini, Grazia Marine and Rubanu were again found guilty by the Sassari Court of Appeal which sentenced them, confirming the sentence of the first instance judges. Marini was sentenced to 30 years in prison and Rubanu to 26 years, while Grazia Marine was sentenced to 25 years and six months.

== Controversy ==
Silvia Melis' father started a second negotiation which agreed that two billion lire should be paid in one go on 4 November. Grauso met the gang's emissaries and handed over the money. Meanwhile, Silvia Melis had already been transferred to the tent between Orgosolo and Nuoro, where her jailer loosened the chain and then moved away, allowing the young woman to leave and reach the road where she was rescued by a passing car. This was not disclosed because the law on the freezing of assets had been circumvented. Silvia would have been kept hidden in a friend's house for a couple more days, in order to organize a credible release. On the afternoon of 11th, Silvia would have returned to the mountains and been found on the side of the road by some motorists who wanted to help her; she allegedly refused to wait for the police. This version has always been rejected by the Melis family; even 20 years after the kidnapping, Silvia Melis claimed to have freed herself, while the jailer (a man never arrested and who perhaps died a few years later of illness) had gone away to retrieve food after having left the chain loose by mistake. Melis allegedly spent a few hours at the commissioner's house, where she was able to wash after 9 months, and put on clean clothes provided by the official's wife.

== See also ==
- List of kidnappings
- List of solved missing person cases: 1950–1999
