= Nicola Grauso =

Italian businessman, publisher and politician

Nicola Grauso (23 April 1949 – 18 May 2025) better known as Nichi, was an Italian businessman, publisher and politician.

== Biography ==
Nicola Grauso was born on 23 April 1949 in Cagliari. Son of Mario, a trader of Neapolitan origin, he graduated in law from the University of Cagliari in 1975. He died on 18 May 2025 in Cagliari.

=== Birth of Radiolina ===
In 1975, Nicola Grauso created Radiolina, the first private radio station in Sardinia and among the first in all of Italy, certainly the oldest among those that have survived. The adventure began in an apartment in Viale Marconi in Quartu Sant'Elena on 19 June 1975 thanks to a military transmitter recovered from a market for equipment and war remnants in Livorno, two plates and a small mixer. Soon the radio station moved to Vico Duomo 1, in the Castello district of Cagliari, in order to have a higher broadcasting position and reach a greater number of users. The programs of a certain importance were broadcast from 7am to midnight and received widespread acclaim, because the novelty of an organized free radio station was strong on the island. In the schedule there were the traditional dedications, information and music led by Super Arsenico, a doctor who at the end of his ward work moved on to the radio console, transmitting the listeners' messages and everything that was alternative: from rock music, to folk and jazz. Initially Grauso and his collaborators were considered pirates and the first criminal complaints arrived pursuant to Law 103 of 1975. For four days, from Tuesday 9th to Saturday 12 July 1975, they were forced to forcefully interrupt their broadcasts. Despite the ministerial offensive, the block on the occupation of frequencies was soon overcome because, at the end of September 1975, the competent judge acquitted those responsible for the radio with a very specific reason: the provisions on the radio broadcasting monopoly should not be applied to local over-the-air broadcasters. A historic ruling that caused a sensation at a national level and was a trailblazer for all broadcasters. However, the acquittal sentence was subsequently challenged by the Public Prosecutor's Office and Radiolina was once again awaiting trial. Despite the bureaucratic vicissitudes, the broadcaster did not stop and a few months after its debut it expanded both in circulation and in the schedule, reaching the point of covering 24 hours and a large part of the district. True antenna freedom will only arrive on 28 July 1976 with the famous sentence number 202 of the Constitutional Court which affirmed the principle of the non-invokability of the limitation of frequencies as regards local transmissions.

=== Videolina ===
On 6 September 1975, a few months after the beginning of the radio adventure, Grauso decided to conquer the television world as well by starting the broadcasts of Videolina. With the debut of Sardinia's first over-the-air television and a few other broadcasters on the peninsula, the history of private broadcasting in Italy began. «Born when it was difficult to be born»: this was one of Videolina's slogans to underline how the Cagliari-based television station had contributed to opening a breach in the communication monopoly which was then the exclusive prerogative of RAI. At the beginning he broadcast from channel UHF 38, albeit only for a few hours a day. Videolina's first schedule featured black and white programs, cartoons by Bruno Bozzetto and pink neorealist films. There was no shortage of news, local sports and island folklore. A few months later, and only partially, the broadcasts will switch to the PAL114 color system, preceding Rai on this occasion, which will only begin to broadcast regularly in color from 1 February 1977 for 3 hours a day on each of the two networks on the air at the time.

In 1979 Grauso took over two other stations founded in the meantime in Cagliari, La Voce Sarda and Bibisì, starting a phase of expansion completed by the positioning of transmitters and repeaters on the peaks of the whole island, creating "electronic bridges" which will also be used by Silvio Berlusconi's networks. The pioneering spirit of Videolina in the early days no longer existed: in its place a real company had arisen, whose signal reached 80% of the Sardinian population.

In 1982 Nicola Grauso was among the few publishers to remain close to Maurizio Costanzo (something Costanzo claims to have never forgotten), ousted from the small screen due to the P2 scandal in titlehe found himself involved. The king of talk shows hosted the Sunday program Dopo cena on Videolina for 14 weeks, an experience that preceded the birth of the later Maurizio Costanzo Show on Rete 4.

Another important editorial choice that made Videolina a point of reference for the Sardinians was to focus on information, arriving in 1988 to continuously broadcast (based on the CNN model), an identical news program every half hour, with the possibility of any updates and news developments. Viewers thus abandoned the habit of listening to the news at certain set times.

=== The success and acquisition of L'Unione Sarda ===
On 17 May 1985, thanks to the success of the now ten-year editorial experience of Videolina and Radiolina, Nicola Grauso purchased the main daily newspaper on the island L'Unione Sarda. At the time of the acquisition, the newspaper was, together with L'Osservatore Romano, the last newspaper to still use lead and linotype. With a further investment of 20 billion lire, Grauso quickly revolutionized everyday life which was profoundly modernized. In 1986 the first computers arrived in the editorial office and the process of electrification and telematization of printing began, replacing lead printing. In the editorial office of L'Unione Sardaa real revolution was witnessed, a "cultural" change of epochal significance. Everyone began to follow retraining courses and prepared themselves for the new way of operating.

The inauguration, in 1987, of a modern press center also contributed to this evolutionary phase. The new system allowed the printing of up to forty pages of the newspaper, also in color and with special inserts, cutting-edge packaging-shipping lines and printing of national newspapers such as Corriere della Sera, Corriere dello Sport - Stadio, La Gazzetta dello Sport, Il Sole 24 Ore, all transmitted electronically from the continent. The facility, located near the Cagliari-Elmas Airport, with its modern architectural profile, was at the time the largest and most technological printing center in the Mediterranean.

The new management contributed to growing the budgets with advertising revenue and to retaining readers with collateral initiatives (such as prize games, contests, winning gadgets and re-bindable attachments). The peak of Grauso's innovative drive at the helm of the island newspaper occurred in July 1994: L'Unione Sarda became the first newspaper in Europe available online, the second in the world after The Boston Globe.

Grauso's editorial experience crossed the borders of Sardinia in 1989 with the purchase of shares in "Rinascita editrice Spa" (owner of the magazine Rinascita, then directed by Alberto Asor Rosa) and of Set, the publishing company that owns Il manifesto.

=== Experience in Poland ===
Being convinced that he has no possibility of movement in Sardinia, due to the political battle against him, in spring 1991 Grauso started crossing Italy's borders by becoming co-owner, through the STEI (Società Televisiva Italiana), of Życie Warszawy, the main newspaper of Warsaw and the second of the entire nation. The two regional editions Zycie Czestochowy and Zycie Radomskie were also included in the deal. Grauso's offer, economically lower than that of communication giants such as the British Maxwell Communication Corporation or the French group Hachette, prevailed thanks to the full support of the president Lech Wałęsa, of the Solidarność union and of the journalists who supported the Sardinian project from the beginning, especially for the planned modernization plan in the offer which followed the experience of purchasing L'Unione Sarda with heavy investments in computerization and the printing centre.

Grauso kept his promises by providing all the necessary funds for a total renovation. First he rented a theater that belonged to the defense secret services in the city centre, which was transformed into an original "open space" editorial office. In the stalls there are stations for journalists and polygraphers, in the gallery there are offices. He then built, in record time, a modern press center on the outskirts of the capital and equipped the editorial staff with latest generation computers thanks to which journalists could already do all the work themselves. The graphics were also modified, involving Piergiorgio Maoloni, a personal friend of Grauso, and made more captivating by giving ample space to quality photography, drawings and cartoons. The production of daily inserts and supplements dedicated to women, work, culture, the economy, young people and sport also began.

Grauso's ambitions, however, did not stop there; his idea was to create the first truly private national Polish TV. The first step, in August 1991, was the purchase of the PTV Echo television network, and subsequently began the installation of antennas in key points of the country: Warsaw, Kraków, Gdańsk, Szczecin, Łódź and Lublin. By early October, the number of stations increased to eleven and by the end of 1992 there were now six local television stations controlled by Grauso. On 11 March 1993 the official announcement of the birth of Polonia 1, in the form of syndication between 12 local broadcasters which reached 20 million Poles. The new company aimed to provide local newspapers with a common schedule of national and international programs thanks to agreements signed by Grauso, for programs and advertising, with Sacis (RAI) and with Fininvest. The broadcasts of Polonia 1 began on Sunday 18 April with the lyric opera Don Giovanni by Mozart and a six-hour schedule with unprecedented Western-style purchasing advice.

The birth of Polonia 1 occurred in the absence of a national broadcasting law which will arrive only at the end of 1993, assigning a single frequency for a national private TV station. Grauso's syndication will thus have to compete with 27 other companies including CNN, Reuters, Canal+ and the German group Bertelsmann. Despite the important groups involved, the frequency was assigned to an entirely Polish company. All attempts at resistance on the part of Grauso were useless and in March 1994, when the game was over, he promoted a major television event live on all syndication televisions: he rented the Teatro Wielki, the largest in the capital, and brought in the Orchestra Filarmonica della Scala with maestro Riccardo Muti. The concert was an unforgettable event: among the excellent guests the former president Francesco Cossiga, among the absent the name of Lech Wałęsa stood out. A big party in the halls of the Bristol hotel was the apotheosis of the event, but also the symbolic epilogue of the Polish adventure.

Faced with the impotence of being able to counteract the new political balance, and despite the transfer of Polonia 1 broadcasts to satellite, Grauso got rid of the station in February 1996 by selling it to Finmedia S.A. Luxemburg by the Italian entrepreneur Mariano Volani. Shortly afterwards it was the turn of Zycie Warszawy and the innovative printing center which in May 1996 were sold to the entrepreneur Zbigniew Jakubas.

=== The birth of Video on Line ===
On 3 December 1994 at the Hotel Principe di Savoia in Milan, Nicola Grauso announced his most futuristic undertaking: “Video On Line”, the first Internet Service Provider to provide not only access to the network but also services comparable to those of a modern portal. All in a world that still ignored internet, in an Italy where the use of computers was limited to offices and universities. In an article of the L'Unione Sarda of 4 December 1994 entitled "How to navigate the sea of online networks" the service was presented as follows: "Video On Line was born, a new telematic service, intended for families and companies, to inform themselves and communicate. It is a system that will allow you to do everything via video, from reading newspapers to press reviews, from consulting the Stock Exchange to databases, from shopping while sitting comfortably at home to looking for a book in the catalogs of hundreds of libraries. It is very easy to use because one click is enough to receive information or purchase products". In an interview from February 1995, Grauso explains how the decision to invest in a sector that was so complex at the time was born: «One day while chatting with the Nobel Prize winner, Carlo Rubbia, I learned a fact that I didn't know: every eighteen months the computer doubles its power and its price halves. It means that we will gradually have increasingly refined and powerful computers at increasingly accessible prices. Today, with just over a million you can buy an interactive tool, decidedly more sophisticated than the best computers of five years ago. The dimensions are also very small: some laptops are as big as a book. This, I told myself, is the mass communication tool of the future. I believe that the normal means of communication are now old, outdated. The future lies precisely in telematics. That is, in the possibility of carrying out incredible operations, thanks to one's computer: working, studying, listening to music, seeing a film, reading a newspaper, buying a CD or a book, buying a dress, communicating with a friend, making a comment to a philosopher or a columnist and getting the answer in real time." Words that today might seem obvious but which at the dawn of 1995 appeared visionary. Nicholas Negroponte, then director of the famous MediaLab research center at the Massachusetts Institute of Technology, will define Grauso's as "one of the 3 projects in the world that show they have better understood the potential of the Internet".

Various services were born within Video On Line, including VoilMail, the first commercial webmail service in the world, which arrived a few months before the global giant Hotmail and VolFTP, an FTP web service that allowed you to download thousands of free software and which came to be among the most used in the world. Among VOL's records we must also include the first musical concert broadcast in streaming, on 16 February 1995 Mariella Nava performed on the stage of the Teatro Comunale di Cagliari bringing the show "Navagando" to the stage and broadcast over the network. The experiment was repeated on April 7, 1995, on the occasion of the first anniversary of Kurt Cobain's death. The event was very heartfelt for the rock star's fans and a dozen major television networks had agreed to simultaneously broadcast a Nirvana show with never-seen footage and live tributes. Video On Line decided to do a live web broadcast to allow internet users to follow the various broadcasts and participate with questions and comments. Today it is normal but for the time it was something revolutionary, just as revolutionary was the possibility of voting online during the Sanremo Festival again through Video on Line.

Grauso's project was not limited to Italy but aimed to conquer the world, based on the fact that at the time there existed AOL, Prodigy and other American internet providers who used exclusively the English language without worrying about providing a service in local European, Asian or for example Arabic languages. VOL was then made available in 26 different languages, including Arabic, Greek, and other non-Indo-European languages. An impressive world promotional tour touched Cannes, Paris, Athens, Alexandria, Sofia, Istanbul, Tunis, Bucharest, Beirut, Budapest, Casablanca, St. Petersburg, Berlin, Lisbon, Amman, Moscow, Madrid, Shanghai, Brussels, Barcelona, Singapore, Stockholm, London, Copenhagen, Jakarta, Geneva, Tel Aviv, Tripoli, Johannesburg, New York and Tehran. The tour also passed through the telematics fair in Silicon Valley in California, i.e. "the beating heart of IT development". A fact of significant importance is that Video On Line was the only company invited besides the American ones, no other global network was considered worthy.

This tour, preceded by an impressive advertising campaign, took place in cities where Video On Line had set up its own server, an electronic center and a telematic network. In each country, collaborative relationships and technical-commercial exchanges had been developed (or would be developed) with IT, publishing and industrial companies for the management of local networks and for the development of economic-financial projects.

Until the birth of Video On Line, telematic traffic between Europe and the United States traveled on two channels: Frankfurt-Stockholm-Washington and London-Washington. Thanks to Grauso's initiative, a third way was created between Cagliari and Washington with a traffic capacity eight times higher than the total of the previous two channels, sensing what the evolution of data traffic would be. On 3 February 1995 two direct 2 Mbit per second lines left from Cagliari for Washington and New York, a third important line connected Cagliari with Europe passing through Milan, Frankfurt, Paris, Stockholm to also end in Washington. Other direct lines connected Cagliari with Moscow and Shanghai.

However, just a year later, in 1996, the initiative had assumed such a dimension that it could not be supported by a publisher with significant means but in any case not sufficient for the necessary development. Reluctantly the Italian internet service provider was sold to Telecom Italia, which created the Tin.it business unit. «Now it's official. Telecom Italia has signed a preliminary document with the Grauso publishing group for the purchase of the online services of Video On Line, one of the main Internet servers. The two companies announced it in a joint note>> reports the news this time La Stampa, with an article published on 6 April 1996: "The Grauso group, for its part, recalls that after having achieved a very important level of presence, quality and image in online services, it recently decided to refocus its activity on the editorial component most linked to the tradition and core business of the group: newspapers, television, radio and the recently acquired paper business".

=== Political experience with Il Nuovo Movimento ===
On 24 July 1997, after a heated clash with the then president of the Sardinia Region Federico Palomba, Nicola Grauso left his editorial duties and founded a political movement with the name Nuovo Movimento. From 20 August 1997 a series of advertising pages were published on L'Unione Sarda. “President Palomba, you have killed every form of minimal democracy in this country…” “You have taken away all hope from the Sardinians…”. “It's time to get moving.” These are the words used in the title of the pages in question in which the publication of the movement's documents in bindable files and available on newsstands was announced. In those same pages Grauso explained the origin of his choice: «[...]It was not difficult when the event of the attack on Palomba sparked tens of thousands of consensus and determined the irrevocable decision to enter politics and recover the references of a convergent thought. Gorbachev, Toffler, László, Negroponte and others on a more general level. Lussu, Bellieni, Cocco Ortu, Gramsci on the most specific aspect of our identity. These are the thinkers we draw on to define a scenario hypothesis."

Although Nicola Grauso abandoned his editorial duties, his entry into the political scene generated profound disappointment which led to a heated clash between Italian National Press Federation, CGIL, CISL, UIL and the assembly of journalists of L'Unione Sarda against Grauso himself, the new publisher Michele Columbu and the then director Antonangelo Liori.

Grauso with his movement then presented himself in the municipal elections of Cagliari in May 1998. Running as mayor of the city, supported by a coalition of minor parties, he obtained 14.47% of preferences which earned him the seat in the city council.

At the 1999 Sardinian regional election Grauso and the New Movement presented themselves in the coalition of the future president Mauro Pili obtaining two seats.

The political experience ended in December 2001, with the resignation of Nicola Grauso from the position of regional councilor, motivating his decision with the need to directly follow the numerous trials in which he found himself involved.

=== The Silvia Melis affair ===
But the most sensational news concerning Grauso was his revelation that, in the countryside of Esterzili, he had paid the ransom for the release of Silvia Melis, kidnapped in Tortolì, in Ogliastra, in February 1997 and freed near Orgosolo, in province of Nuoro, the following November; the Cagliari judiciary strongly denied that a ransom had ever been paid, asserting that Silvia Melis would have freed herself, and yet Grauso held firm to his positions, ending up under investigation for aiding and abetting.

In 1998 he ran for mayor of Cagliari with his "New Movement" list, against the outgoing Mariano Delogu of the Polo per le Libertà, obtaining about 10 percent of the votes. Nicola Grauso will enter into an irrepressible controversy with the judiciary of Palermo and Cagliari after August 1998, when the magistrate Luigi Lombardini, accused with him of attempted extortion against Silvia Melis's father, tragically committed suicide in his office; heated controversies will follow and, in particular, an initiative by the Public Prosecutor's Office of Cagliari aimed at propitiating the administration of L'Unione Sarda for debts.

Following this initiative, Grauso will have to sell all his publishing activities to the entrepreneur Sergio Zuncheddu; however, he will be able to enter the Sardinia Regional Council with his party and contribute to determining the conditions for sending his political opponents into opposition. Grauso and the co-defendants were later acquitted of the charges on the grounds that the crime did not exist.

=== Mission in Tripoli ===
On 24 April 1998 Nicola Grauso moved personally, together with Vittorio Sgarbi, to try to resolve the situation of the Sardinian worker Marcello Sarritzu, blocked in Libya with his wife by the Tripoli government with no money and no job. The authorities had seized his passport as a guarantee for the tax debts of the Milanese construction company where he worked. At the time of the mission, the worker had been held against his will for 7 months, when in October he had tried to return to Sardinia due to the death of his father-in-law. The sensational action started from Lampedusa with two small Pipers and Grauso himself in command of the first. The intent is to get to Tripoli by violating the embargo imposed by the United Nations since 1992. At 11:43am, the first plane landed, with Nicola Grauso on board was welcomed by journalists and authorities. For the first time since 1992 the embargo was broken and media attention finally focused on the Sarritzu case. On 26 April Nicola Grauso proposed exchanging passports to the Libyan authorities, offering to remain in Libya to manage the situation, thus allowing the return of Marcello Sarritzu and his wife to Sardinia. When everything seemed to be done, with the plane ready to leave on the runway, operations were called to a halt followed by moments of understandable tension. At that point Nicola Grauso telephoned the then minister of foreign affairs Lamberto Dini who invited him not to rush the process, ensuring a solution in a few days. However, things did not go that way and Grauso remained in Libya for several days to assist and help Marcello Sarritzu and his wife Annamaria Pizzittu to complete the bureaucratic procedures to speed up his return to Italy. On May 16, with the Sardinian worker still detained in Libya and the unfulfilled promises of the Ministry of Foreign Affairs, Nicola Grauso gave an interview to Radio Radicale in which he expressed all his disappointment with the government's management of the situation: "After the violation of this embargo it seemed that Sarritzu would be handed over to us in a very short time and instead the Italian government, in particular the Ministry of Foreign Affairs, which until that moment had been totally inert in relation to Sarritzu's events and had done nothing to try to bring this man back to Italy, was seized by a sacred fury to act, taking action to ensure that Sarritzu was not released in a time frame too close to our action. This was to avoid there being a connection and a fallout of a positive image on Sgarbi and on me to the release of this man. So on the one hand it is a further criticism of our diplomatic authorities, I am sorry to say, who even instrumentally continue to let this man remain in Libya today, no longer paradoxically blocked by the Libyans but blocked by our own government. On the other hand, however, I am sure that in the space of 15-20 days, in any case once more time has passed between the moment of the breaking of the embargo and his probable release, I imagine that Sarritzu could return to Italy".

The certainties of a quick return to Italy, however, were again disregarded and, despite the sensational action of April and the reassurances of the Italian government, Marcello Sarritzu managed to return to Italy only on 2 July. His plane landed in Cagliari at 2 in the morning welcomed by Nicola Grauso and some journalists. His first statements once he landed were "This is a great day. It was Gaddafi who gave the OK for my return home. A courtesy towards Italy, towards Nicola Grauso and Vittorio Sgarbi who on 24 April sensationally broke the embargo by arriving at Tripoli airport with two small planes. Thus my case emerged from anonymity".

=== Mission in Baghdad ===
On 3 April 2000 Nicola Grauso again in the company of Vittorio Sgarbi and father Jean Marie Benjamin carried out what was called "Operation SOS Iraq People". With a small tourist plane owned by the company Air mach s.r.l. of Novi Ligure and commanded by the Italian pilot Nicola Trifoni, decided to sensationally violate the No-Fly Zone imposed by the USA on Iraq in 1990, flying from Amman to Baghdad.

In an interview given to Radio Radicale, Nicola Grauso motivates the gesture thus: "In the media world in which we find ourselves today, immersed in often experiencing the communications of even stronger and more serious facts which can gain space in the media but which are then forgotten the next day and then we must accompany the complaints with behaviors which are in themselves sensational, symbolic and significant. Talking about one and a half million deaths in Iraq, talking about 500,000 dead children, talking about the 5000 children who continue to die every month and who, above all,die without a painkiller, without minimal assistance even for the suffering that accompanies their death, it would have become almost impossible if there hadn't been a gesture that also took on media relevance such as breaking the embargo and having done this with a 1000 km flight over the desert at low altitude. We hope, indeed, I ask journalists and information workers to loosen up for a moment the representation, however adventurous, of the flight and everything that accompanied this initiative, placing the emphasis on the real reasons that were at the basis of this initiative of ours: 5000 children who die every month, they die in pain and they die because they suffer the effects of bombings that have been done with bombs based on depleted uranium. A material that comes from the use of American nuclear power plants, a material that has the characteristic of weighing approximately 10 times more than lead and which is therefore used because it has a much more devastating mechanical dynamic effect than any other bomb, simply because it weighs more. Bombs which have the second effect of leaving millions of pieces of radioactive material on the territory, continuing to perpetrate devastating effects of death even in the years following the bombing. Direct exposure of people to these fragments causes leukemia and causes weakening of the immune systems and therefore deaths for the most varied reasons. It causes pollution of the aquatic aquifers and therefore, let's say, it also totally undermines the food cycle of this country. It is a war that does not have the mushroom of Hiroshima or Nagasaki but it is a war that can be defined as atomic. 700 tons of this material litter expanses of Iraqi territory, it must be removed and the embargo must be eliminated which complicates any action to return Iraq and the Iraqi population to the civil community, but which also makes the supply and arrival of drugs and medicines problematic. In essence, although the capacity for self-referentiality that Western states have with the control of the media allows them to dignify any war and any battle, in reality it is a genocide. It is a concentration camp where instead of barbed wire we have no-fly zones and instead of torturers inside the concentration camp we have pieces of Uranium which continuously cause death".

The same motivations were presented to the UN's then-secretary general Kofi Annan in a letter written by Father Jean Marie Benjamin:

"In essence, despite the ability of self-reference that stAlways in the interview with Radio Radicale, Nicola Grauso explained the dynamics of the flight by exonerating the pilot of the aircraft: "when we took off from Amman asserting that we would be heading towards Damascus, he was absolutely unaware of the fact that we would then divert and that, when we found ourselves with the plane on the border between Iraq, Syria and Jordan, I, who was sitting next to him, took hold of the control stick and directed the airplane towards Baghdad. At that point he, out of a state of necessity for reasons of safety of himself and all the other passengers, rightly adopted a behavior that was legally required of him, not to resist and not to compromise the safety of Western flights with the control of the media, allowing them to ennoble any war and any battle, in reality it is a genocide. It is a concentration camp where instead of barbed wire we have no-fly zones and instead of torturers inside the concentration camp we have pieces of Uranium which continuously cause death"

=== Experience with E Polis ===
After other discussed initiatives, such as the mass buying and selling of internet domains, numerous of which with the names of politicians, journalists and magistrates, Grauso, from October 2004, forcefully returned to the field of publishing, creating a network of regional and local newspapers, under the national acronym E Polis, promoted through an aggressive free distribution policy; unlike previous positions taken by Grauso, the line of these newspapers was oriented to the left, and moreover, Grauso's closeness to the former president of the Sardinia Region, Renato Soru is known who, using the technology and know how made available to him by Grauso, created the internet provider Czech On Line in the Czech Republic. In April 2007 he founded the advertising agency Epm.

In July of the same year, a serious financial crisis led to the suspension of the publications of all 15 newspapers in the publishing chain and starting from 1 August the payment of Layoffs for all the group's employees. On 10 September 2007 the E Polis newspapers resumed publication and then definitively ceased in January 2011 with a bankruptcy petition filed by the Grauso family, owners of the property in Cagliari in which the editorial office was located.

In 2016 he was sent to trial. At the end of 2024 the sentence will arrive from the Court of Cagliari.

=== The collapse of the Arbatax paper mill ===
On 23 September 2011, after being acquitted in the first instance, he was convicted on appeal in Cagliari together with Antonangelo Liori, Michele Dore, Andreano Madeddu, Claudio Marcello Massa and Alfredo Boletti for charges ranging in various capacities from fraudulent bankruptcy to other crimes related to bankruptcy. The conviction was later annulled by the Supreme Court due to the expiry of the statute of limitations.

=== Last years ===
In February 2024 he received the diagnosis of inoperable small cell lung cancer. He died on May 18, 2025, aged 76.
