= Badu 'e Carros =

Prison in Sardinia, Italy

Coordinates: 40°18′47″N 9°18′14″E

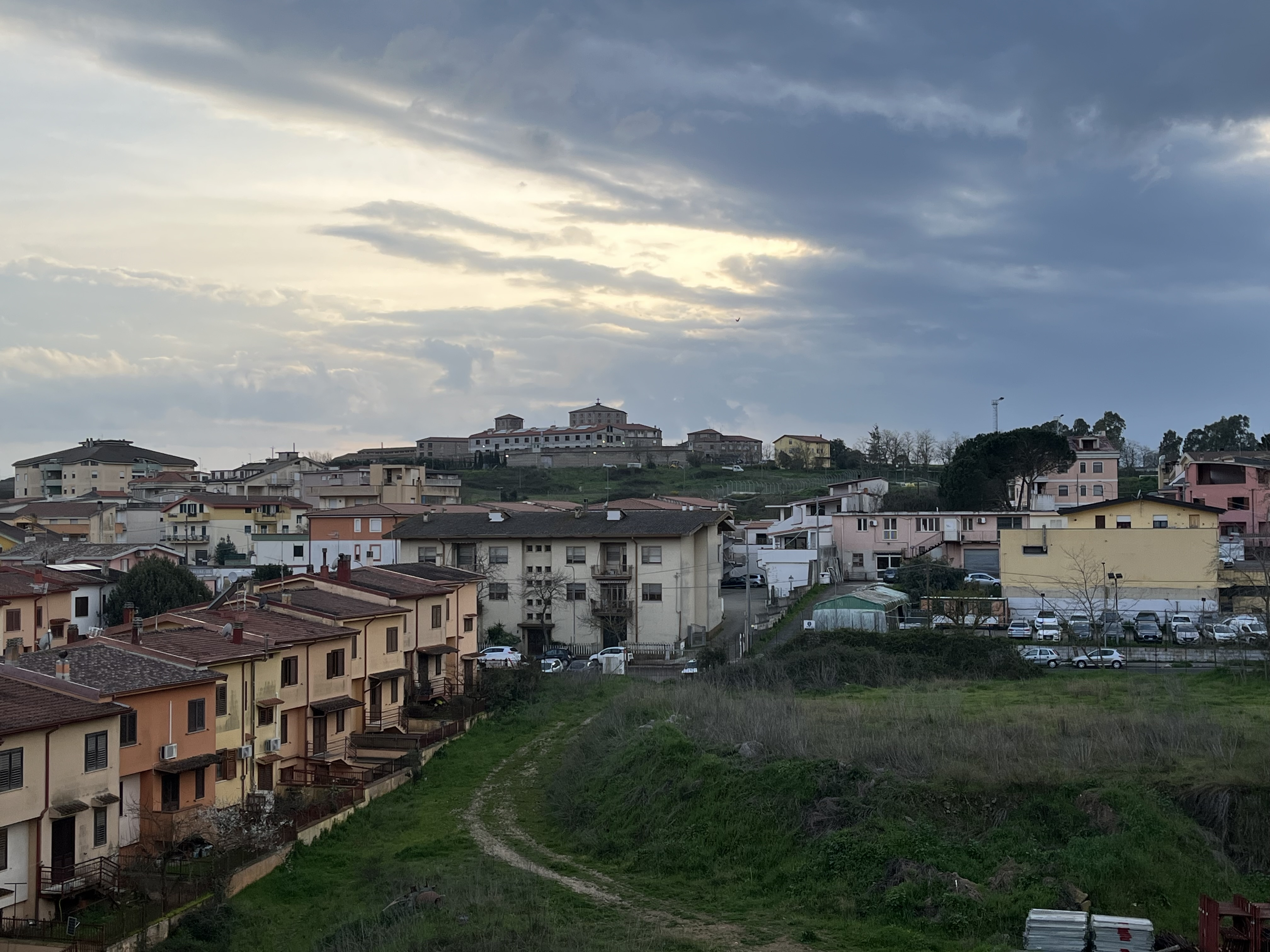
Badu 'e Carros prison seen from Constitution Avenue.

Badu 'e Carros is a high-security jailhouse in Nuoro, Sardinia, Italy. It was opened in the 1970s and is located on the outskirts of the town. The jailhouse is mostly used for special kinds of prisoners like terrorists, highly dangerous mobsters and members of Cosa Nostra, Camorra or 'Ndrangheta. As of 11 September 2025, 216 people are serving time there.

== Notable inmates ==
- Luciano Leggio
- Renato Vallanzasca
- Francis Turatello
- Antonio Iovine
- Pasquale Barra
- Attilio Cubeddu
- Mullah Krekar
- Graziano Mesina

== See also ==
- Article 41-bis prison regime
- Brigate Rosse
