= Videolina =

Television station in Calabria, Italy

- Country: Italy
- Broadcast area: Sardinia

Programming
- Language: Italian
- Picture format: 4:3 SDTV

Ownership
- Owner: Videolina S.p.A. (L'Unione Sarda S.p.A.)

History
- Launched: 4 September 1975

Links
- Website: http://www.lactv.it/

Availability

Terrestrial
- Digital: LCN 10

Videolina is an Italian regional television channel of Sardinia based in the city of Cagliari, its headquarters are located there at L'Unione Sarda's headquarters.

== History ==
Nicola Grauso, founder of Radiolina, started Videolina on 6 September 1975, becoming one of the first private television stations attempting to break RAI's monopoly. One of its advertising slogans at launching time was "born when it was hard to give birth". It had a small television transmitter, a video recorder and a camera, as well as filmed material obtained from a TV station in Livorno. The first program seen was the Bruno Bozzetto animated film West and Soda, in color, at 9:30pm. Within months, the station gained notoriety. It broadcast in color before RAI's networks did so, they began the process only on 1 February 1977 for three hours a day in an initial phase.

On 3 July 1976 at 9pm, the first edition of TGS (Telegiornale Sardo) went live. Its turning point came in April 1978, with the arrival of two young journalists, Francesco Birocchi and Andrea Coco, the former became its director between December 1979 and March 1983. TGS was described as free, independent and "neutral". However, unlike RAI, the bulletins were always pre-recorded. By 1983, it had three editions, at 2pm, 8:20pm and 11:30pm, later four in 1987, at 2pm, 6pm, 8:20pm and 11:40pm. News updates every half-hour were added in 1988, based on the model CNN was already doing.

In 2000, following the events linked to the kidnapping of Silvia Melis, Nicola Grauso left the management of the broadcaster. In this regard, Grauso declared: "My companies were placed under receivership despite not having an injunction or seizure. The simple action of placing under receivership and the intention of the Judiciary to want to take the newspaper, radio and TV away from me were enough to destabilize the companies and make me lose the physiological support from the financial system. I had to sell the entire group to Sergio Zuncheddu for 120 billion".

As of 2011, it claimed 400,000 daily viewers and a 2,8% share, making it the most watched regional channel in Sardinia.
