= 90º minuto =

Italian sport TV show

- Created by: Maurizio Barendson, Remo Pascucci and Paolo Valenti
- Opening theme: "Pancho" by Jack Trombey
- Country of origin: Italy
- Original language: Italian
- No. of seasons: 54 (as for 2023-24)

Production
- Running time: 60 min

Original release
- Network: Rai 2
- Release: September 27, 1970 – present

90º minuto (translated: "ninetieth minute") is an Italian long-running Sunday RAI television program broadcast since 1970. During its history, the title was also spelled as Novantesimo minuto.

The sport program was created by Maurizio Barendson, Paolo Valenti and Remo Pascucci and debuted on 27 September 1970 at 18:00 on Programma Nazionale (currently Rai 1).

The program, which provides results and reports of Serie A and Serie B football matches, achieved its major fame between 1970s and early 1990s, mainly thanks to the popularity of its colorful group of stadium correspondents. The co-creator Paolo Valenti was the longest-running presenter of the program, from 1970 until a few months before his death in 1990. Later, several journalists alternated, notably Fabrizio Maffei, Giampiero Galeazzi and Paola Ferrari.
