= Renato Vallanzasca =

Italian gangster (born 1950)

- Vallanzasca c. 1970s
- Born: 4 May 1950 (age 76); Milan, Italy
- Other name: il bel René ("the handsome René")
- Occupations: Crime boss, criminal
- Spouses: Giuliana Brusa (m. 1979; div. 1990) Antonella D'Agostino (m. 2008)
- Children: 1
- Status: Imprisoned since 1977
- Penalty: Life imprisonment with permit to exit prison in the daytime to participate in work activities

Renato Vallanzasca Costantini (Italian pronunciation: [reˈnaːto vallanˈdzaska, -ˈtsaska]; born 4 May 1950) is a notorious Italian mobster from Milan who was a powerful figure in the Milanese underworld during the 1970s.

Following numerous robberies, kidnappings, murders, and many years as a fugitive, he is currently serving four consecutive life sentences with an additional 295 years in prison, but with permission to work outside during the day. This enables him to go to work every morning in a workshop in the periphery of Milan, making bags from recycled material. He is a local celebrity in Milan, famous for appealing to part of public opinion for his image linked to the "myth of the bandit".

== Biography ==
=== Early life ===
Vallanzasca was born in Milan, in the Lambrate district where his mother owned a clothing store. He was given the surname of his mother because his biological father, Osvaldo Pistoia, was already married to another woman by whom he had three children.

Vallanzasca became involved in vandalism and petty criminal activities early in his childhood. His first arrest occurred at the age of eight for having tried to let a tiger out of its cage, which belonged to a circus that had tented near his house. He was apprehended the following day and taken to Cesare Beccaria detention home. Because of this act, he was legally compelled to move into an aunt's house, in via degli Apuli, in the district of Giambellino, in the southern periphery of Milan, practically on the opposite side of the city.

=== Banda della Comasina ===
It was during this time that he formed his own gang of children involved in stealing and shoplifting. In spite of his young age, Vallanzasca was already a gang leader and began to make a name for himself in the ligera, the old Milanese underworld, with whose members he quickly began to cooperate. But shortly thereafter, resenting the rules and the "code" of the old criminal underworld, he decided to form his own criminal outfit called the Banda della Comasina, which soon grew to become the most powerful and ferocious gang in Milan during those years. The Banda della Comasina was a strong rival and enemy to the gang which was headed by Francis Turatello.

Renato Vallanzasca in his youth. c. 1970's

Within a short period, Vallanzasca accumulated a lot of money due to the numerous robberies and thefts carried out by his gang, and began to live an extravagant lifestyle: he took to wearing expensive designer clothes, driving luxury cars and would usually be seen in the company of beautiful women. His looks earned him the nickname il bel René ("the handsome René"), a nickname he detested.

=== First arrest and escape ===
His smooth and successful criminal career was interrupted for the first time in 1972 when, 10 days after the robbery of a supermarket, he was arrested by men belonging to the squadra mobile (flying squad) headed by Achille Serra. Serra later claimed that during the search of his house, Vallanzasca unstrung his gold Rolex wristwatch and put it on a table, telling him, "If you succeed in tying this to me, it is yours". A few minutes later, warrant officer Oscuri found some shreds of paper in the dustbin, which, once put together, showed a list of salaries of the employees in the supermarket previously robbed. In 1973, his girlfriend Ripalta Pioggia gave birth to their son, Massimiliano Domenico.

As a result, Vallanzasca was convicted and sent to the San Vittore penitentiary. During the four and a half years of imprisonment, he unsuccessfully attempted to escape from the prison more than once. He was also involved in numerous fights and beatings, and was also an active participant in the various prison riots which erupted in the local prison environment during this period. These factors caused him to be transferred to 36 different prisons within a four-and-a-half-year period. Eventually, he found a way of escaping by voluntarily contracting Hepatitis. He did this by ingesting rotten eggs, injecting urine intravenously into his bloodstream and inhaling propane gas. He was then transferred to the hospital, where he managed to escape with the help of a complacent policeman.

=== Life as a fugitive ===
After his escape, on 25 July 1976, Vallanzasca was free again. He still wanted money in the shortest time because he wanted to spend time with his girlfriend Ripalta and his son, Massimiliano; he spent about a month with them between Sorrento and Cilento before returning to hiding in Milan.

After leaving his son and girlfriend, Vallanzasca reassembled his old gang and began a series of new robberies, which totalled seventy. These robberies caused several deaths, including those of four policemen, a doctor and a bank employee. He also committed four kidnappings for ransom, two of which were never reported to the police. One of the gang's victims was Emanuela Trapani, the daughter of a local Milanese entrepreneur who was held captive for over a month and a half, from December 1976 to January 1977, and then released upon the payment of a ransom of one billion in Italian currency. This incident coupled with the killing on 6 February 1977 of two highway patrolmen near Dalmine, Luigi D'Andrea and Renato Barborini, who had stopped the car on which he was travelling to evade capture, caused him to flee Milan for Rome. There he was again recaptured, on 15 February 1977 while still just 26 years old.

=== Return to prison ===
Vallanzasca (right) with fellow Milanese mobster, Francis Turatello (left), during his wedding in prison (1979)

After his return to prison, in 1979 Vallanzasca married his new girlfriend, Giuliana Brusa. His former enemy, Milanese crime boss Francis Turatello acted as best man, thus sealing a temporary alliance between the two. On 17 August 1981, Turatello was eventually assassinated at the Badu 'e Carros, the high-security prison in Nuoro, Sardinia, by a Neapolitan Camorrista Pasquale Barra, along with Vincenzo Andraous and Antonino Faro, two Sicilian Mafiosi from Catania, Sicily. The hit had probably been ordered by Raffaele Cutolo, the boss of the Nuova Camorra Organizzata.

On 28 April 1980, Vallanzasca again attempted to escape from the San Vittore Prison in Milan. During time in the open air, a group of prisoners mysteriously produced three guns, and managed to make headway taking a brigadiere (a prison guard staff sergeant), Romano Saccoccio, as hostage. A firefight commenced in the streets of Milan and followed in the tunnels. A wounded Vallanzasca was arrested together with nine other escapees.

=== The Novara prison riot ===
In the Novara prison, in 1981, he helped to set in motion a prison revolt in which some pentiti, or collaborators with Italian Justice lost their lives. Among them was a former member of his gang, Massimo Loi. According to Achille Serra, the young man who was in his early twenties had decided to abandon the path of crime and begin a new life in the legitimate world. However, Vallanzasca armed with a knife and supported by the prison crowd would not allow him to leave the prison unharmed. Loi was cornered inside his prison cell, alone and unarmed. Assisted by others, Vallanzasca repeatedly stabbed him in the chest with a knife, committing further atrocities on his mutilated corpse, and finally beheading him and, it is said, throwing his head in the toilet. In an interview with L'Espresso on 2 April 2006, Vallanzasca vehemently denied any responsibility for the murder of Loi.

However, it is certain that Vallanzasca participated in the revolt at the Novara prison, during which two people were killed, one of which was Massimo Loi. It seems that Vallanzasca, in reality, was distanced from the gruesome episode, because there were others involved, as also they attest to the confessions of those days and dynamics of the revolt.

In interviews on the DVD of the film Angels of Evil, the actor who plays Vallanzasca related how he and Vallanzasca met and he admitted to the killing of Loi. He explained that he had denied it because the young man's mother was still alive but that once she had died he felt he could own up to the murder.

=== More escape attempts ===
Renato Vallanzasca being led by the police after his arrest in 1977

Sentenced to a harsh prison term, Vallanzasca succeeded in tricking the police officers and managed to escape on 18 July 1987 through a porthole of the ferry which carried him to Asinara, Sardinia. He was stopped at a traffic control post less than three weeks after, while he was trying to reach Trieste. After returning to prison, Vallanzasca again tried escaping from prison in 1995, this time from the Nuoro prison. In this escape attempt, he was accused and suspected of having been aided by his lawyer, with whom he had close links. His father, Osvaldo Pistoia, died on 10 January the following year, aged 95.

=== Present life ===
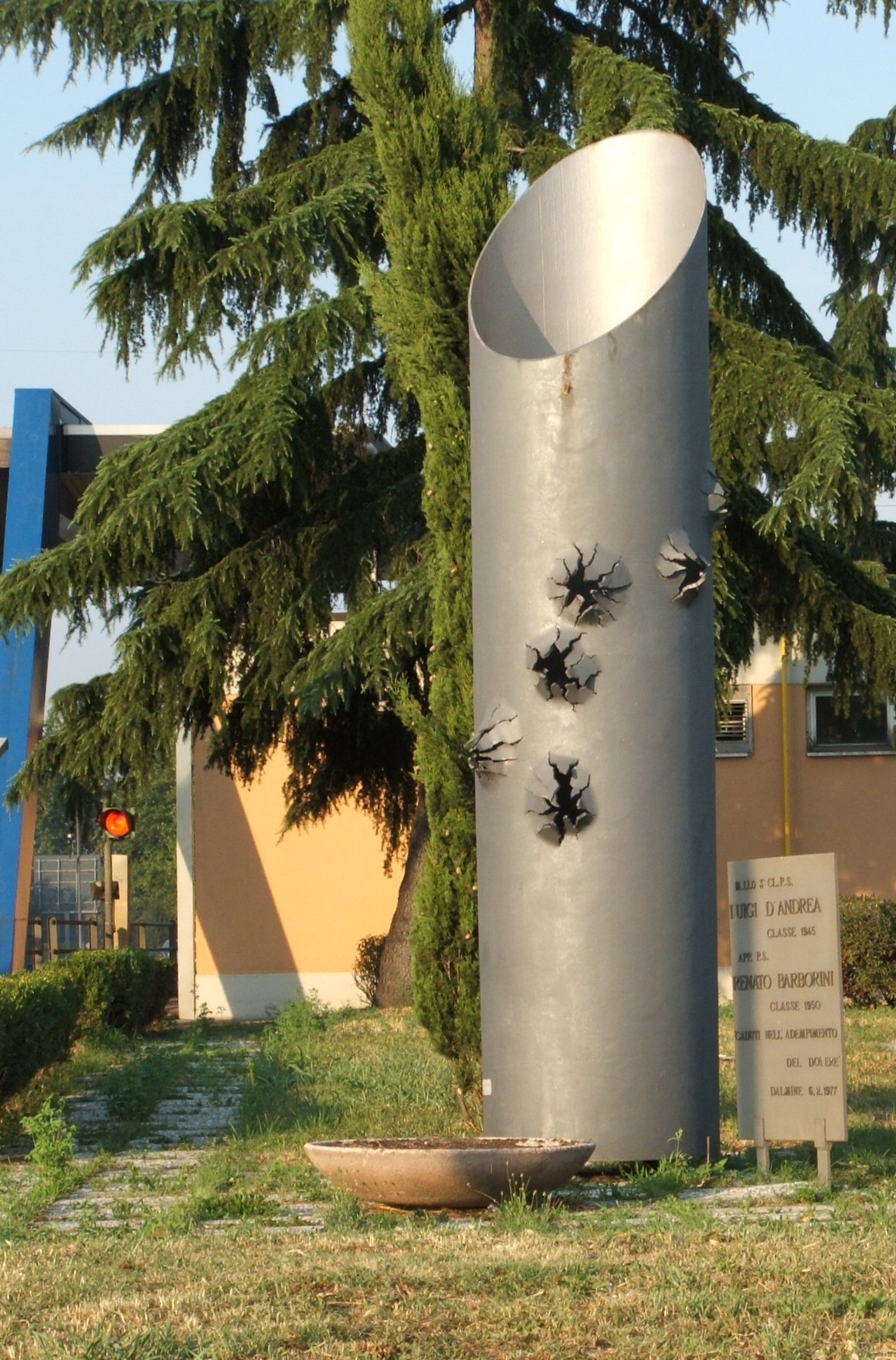
The monument to the memory of the two policemen killed on 6 February 1977 at the Dalmine tollbooth, Luigi D'Andrea and Renato Barborini

Since 1999, Vallanzasca has been incarcerated in a maximum security prison in the town of Voghera. At the beginning of May 2005, after having received a special three-hour permit to meet his elderly mother, he formalized a request for clemency by sending a letter to the Ministry of Justice, and to the magistrate of surveillance of Pavia. On 15 July 2007, his mother wrote to the Italian president Giorgio Napolitano and the minister of Justice, Clemente Mastella, requesting clemency for her son. On 15 September 2007, Vallanzasca was notified by the Presidency of the Republic that all requests for clemency had been refused. He then continued serving his sentence at the Opera prison in Milan.

In May 2008, he married his childhood friend, Antonella D'Agostino. The marriage was formalised with a civil ceremony on 5 May 2008.

Beginning in March 2010, Vallanzasca was given a permit to exit prison in the daytime to participate in work activities. He leaves his cell every day at 7:30 and returns at 19:00. His mother died on 8 February 2011, aged 94.

On 13 June 2014, during the semi-courtship granted by the prison of Bollate, he attempted to unpack and steal underwear and gardening material at a supermarket in Milan and was arrested by the carabinieri for the crime of aggravated improper robbery. The following day, 14 June, he was sentenced to 10 months in jail plus a 330 euro fine. Following his conviction for supermarket theft, Vallanzasca lost his right to temporary release and semi-liberty for a long time.

In the following years, serious neurodegenerative diseases have emerged. Lawyers have repeatedly reported that the former boss suffers from an advanced form of Alzheimer's and dementia, which renders him unable to understand the meaning of his imprisonment. After several rejected requests, in September 2024 the Milan Surveillance Court granted a deferral of the sentence in the form of house arrest. In November 2024 he was transferred from the Bollate prison to the "Opera della Provvidenza" nursing home in Rubano, in the province of Padua, a facility specialized in the care of patients with serious mental health deficits.

In his "criminal career" he collected in total four life sentences and 295 years of imprisonment.

== In popular culture ==
- In 1977, a film was released entitled La Banda Vallanzasca which was directed by Mario Bianchi. The plot however has nothing to do with Vallanzasca.
- In 2005, Vallanzasca was portrayed in a theatre play which was based on his life entitled "Settanta Vallanzasca" by Domenico Ferrari and Alessandro Pozzetti.
- The beautiful René inspired the name of an Italian Ska group, Vallanzaska.
- In 2007, the life story of Renato Vallanzasca was told for the first time on television in a documentary realized for the TV show "La Storia siamo noi" (History is us) at Rai Edu.
- The film Vallanzasca - Gli angeli del male was released in 2010, directed by Michele Placido. In the role of Vallanzasca is Kim Rossi Stuart.
