= Barbagian Code =

Type of code used in Sardinia

The Barbagian Code can be called a code of behavior not written that prevailed not only in the Barbagia, the Sardinian historical region referred to, but in all the municipalities of province of Nuoro and Ogliastra, in those of Goceano (province of Sassari) and in some high Oristanese.

== Features ==
This is a kind of code of honor, similar to a parallel justice, which has sometimes replaced legal organs of the territory. Some scholars believe that behind the creation of the Code there is the lack of protection of the individual from the state, which in the years in question was not present in the territory.

This situation of a stateless motivated the bloody actions of criminal organizations of the 20th century and ruled the wires of the same organization Sardinian Kidnappings Anonima in the 1960s.

According to research by Antonietta Mazzette, professor at the University of Sassari, conducted in 2006 in this area takes place most of the bloody events of the island. Although the population is very small, this area corresponds to that in which it developed, from 18th century, the so-called "classic banditry".

Much of the code is and defines the injuries suffered, by the personal insult, theft and murder, and penalties; the socio-economic environment in which this process has been developed is to agro-pastoral. The purpose is to protect the honor and the dignity of the individual.

== Example ==
In case an individual suffers a theft of cattle, it will not be theft in itself to constitute damage, but the intrinsic meaning to which was targeted crime: in this case the loss of the family self-subsistence offense. The latter will have the right to vengeance, which must be proportionate to the damage suffered. As regards the side of the strictly economic loss, the individual offended commit in turn a theft of cattle to return to a situation of equality.

== See also ==
- Sardinian banditry
- Barbagia
- Goceano

== Bibliography ==
- Antonio Pigliaru, Il codice della vendetta barbaricina (The Barbagian Code), Edizioni Il Maestrale.
- Carlo Lucarelli, The Sardinian anomaly in Stories of gangs, mafias and honest people, Cambridge University Press, 2008.
- Ignazio Pirastu, Sardinia under investigation – The report of Ignazio Pirastu on Sardinian crime, Banditi e Carabinieri, The Library of La Nuova Sardegna.
- Luigi Casalunga, Anonima Sequestri Sarda, The archive of the crimes (1960–1997)
- Elettrio Corda, The Law and the bush – The Sardinian bandits from the eighteenth century to the present day, Rusconi
- Girolamo Sotgiu, History of Sardinia after the unification.
- Vilfredo Pareto, Trattato di sociologia generale, vol. II, ch. XII
