= Anonima sarda =

Italian journalistic expression describing Sardinian kidnapping groups

Anonima sarda/Anonima sequestri
- Years active: 1960s–1997
- Territory: Italy
- Ethnicity: Sardinians
- Criminal activities: kidnapping, murder

Anonima sarda (Italian: [aˈnɔːnima ˈsarda], Sardinian: [aˈnonima ˈzaɾda]; also anonima sequestri) is an Italian journalistic expression widely used by the Italian media as an umbrella to describe the Sardinian groups operating kidnappings for ransom, which took place for the most part in the Mediterranean island of Sardinia between the 1960s and 1997.

The expression is misleading as it depicts something like a Sardinian criminal syndicate, similar to the Sicilian Mafia, the Calabrian 'Ndrangheta or the Campanian Camorra. Instead, the Sardinian bandits responsible for the kidnappings lacked any kind of command structure, did not exert any influence on political institutions, specialized in basically one criminal activity, and several groups of bandits would operate with little to no relationship with each other.

The frequency and severity of kidnappings for ransom operated by the Sardinian bandits became relevant and gained national-level notoriety in the 1960s when they started targeting people on the Italian peninsula and even famous Italians like Fabrizio de André. 150 kidnappings have been counted in Sardinia between 1960 and 1997 when the phenomenon is conventionally said to have ended.

== Characteristics ==
Unlike the hierarchical structure of the Italian criminal gangs like the Sicilian mafia and the Camorra, which have a certain internal order and infiltrate the political apparatus, the Sardinian bandits, indicated as Anonima Sarda by Italian journalists, operated as a group mainly for specific kidnappings, with no interest in and capability for exercising influence over political parties or the Italian state, nor did they associate with Italian criminal organizations.

Therefore, it is not correct to talk of a Sardinian criminal syndicate, since the Sardinian bandits responsible for the kidnappings lacked any kind of command structure, did not influence the political sphere, and several groups of bandits would operate with little to no relationship with each other.

The bandits, the most infamous of them being Graziano Mesina (also known as Gratzianeddu in Sardinian), Matteo Boe and Attilio Cubeddu (still one of the most wanted fugitives in Italy) to name a few, operated mainly in Sardinia but also in the nearby island of Corsica and, from the second post-war period onwards, decided to target the Italian peninsula, especially in regions where Sardinian immigrants already operated as shepherds. Sardinian bandits have now stopped the activity of kidnapping for ransom.

Several writers have indicated an unwritten set of norms called "Barbagian Code" which was common to the rural and pastoral inner lands of Sardinia, these being the areas where most kidnappers originated, as well as those of hiding for most captivities. The first documented kidnapping carried out in the contemporary era dates back to 1875 (the noblemen Antonio Meloni Gaia was kidnapped in Mamoiada in May 1875 in his vineyard, but managed to free himself and escape captivity later the same day), while the unwritten code is assumed to have always existed in parallel to the written codes of the several foreign powers that ruled the island.

== See also ==
- Sardinian banditry
- Sardinian Armed Movement

== Bibliography ==
- Antonio Pigliaru, Il codice della vendetta barbaricina ("The Barbagian Code"), Edizioni Il Maestrale.
- Paola Sirigu, Il codice barbaricino, La Riflessione (Davide Zedda Editore), 2007
- Elettrio Corda, The Law and the bush: The Sardinian bandits from the eighteenth century to the present day, Rusconi
- Luigi Casalunga, Anonima Sequestri Sarda, The archive of the crimes (1960–1997)
