= Portobello (1977 TV series) =

1977 Italian television variety show

- Created by: Enzo Tortora
- Country of origin: Italy
- Original language: Italian
- No. of seasons: 7

Original release
- Network: Rai 2
- Release: May 27, 1977 – June 3, 1983
- Release: February 20 – June 19, 1987
- Network: Rai 1
- Release: October 27 – December 8, 2018

Portobello is an Italian Friday night variety show created and hosted by Enzo Tortora. It was broadcast on Rai 2 between 1977 and 1983 and again in 1987. A reboot hosted by Antonella Clerici was broadcast by Rai 1 in 2018.

== Overview ==
The show debuted on Rai 2 on 27 May 1977. The structure of the show revolved around various segments, the most notable of them being the presentation of new inventions, with inventors promoting and selling their patents. Other segments included Fiori d'arancio, a dating segment where lonely hearts met in search of a soulmate that was an early forerunner of Canale 5 programs such as Agenzia matrimoniale and Uomini e donne, and Dove sei?, a segment about missing persons that anticipated the Rai 3 long-running show Chi l'ha visto?.

Portobello was a massive success, with an audience reaching 25 million viewers. It was suddenly interrupted because of Tortora's conviction for drug trafficking and for being a member of the Camorra; following his full acquittal, it was reprised for a final season in 1987. In 2018, the show was remade in a retouched version, hosted by Antonella Clerici; this version, broadcast on Saturday nights on Rai 1, was both a critical and audience failure.
