= Sardinian banditry =

Aspect of the Italian island

Sardinian banditry describes an outlaw behavior typical of the Mediterranean island of Sardinia, dating back to the Roman Empire. Twentieth-century Sardinian banditry had economic and political overtones.

== History ==
Eleanor of Arborea, in her Carta de Logu, authorized remedies for banditry. The first kidnapping for ransom resulting from banditry was reported in 1477 in the Baronia of Posada, between Olbia and Siniscola. Banditry was particularly prevalent during Sardinia's Spanish occupation. During the seventeenth century, the regions around Sassari, Nuoro, Goceano and Gallura were centers of outlaw activity.

The situation did not change under the rule of the Alpine House of Savoy, and the first measures were introduced to suppress banditry in 1720. On March 13, 1759, regulations for the administration of the justice in the Kingdom of Sardinia were enacted. At that time, smuggling was widespread in some regions of Sardinia, such as Gallura. Savoyard decrees forbidding the Sardinians from growing beards were enacted, in the belief that doing so would decrease crime rates.

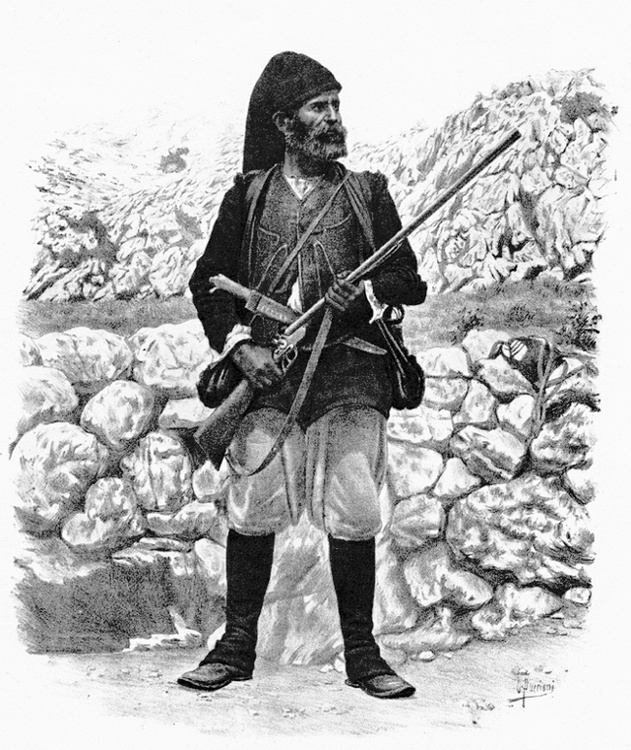
The Sardinian outlaw Giovanni Corbeddu Salis, popularly known as "the King of the bush"

During the first half of the nineteenth century, banditry was connected with clashes between clans which were interspersed with truces endorsed by civil and religious authorities. Until 1827, any bandit could be killed with impunity, but could earn a pardon for themself and their entire family by turning in another bandit who had earned an equal or greater sentence.

Around 1875, the practice of kidnapping for ransom revived.

Bardanas were armed expeditions to plunder a village and strip wealthy landowners. The best-known bardana took place in Tortolì. During the night of November 13–14, 1894, a group of a hundred horsemen went to the comune. They besieged the house of the wealthy Vittorio Depau, killed a servant who had shot at them, and invaded the house (whose inhabitants had barricaded themselves in an attic). The seven Carabinieri failed to halt the raid but killed a bandit, whose body was removed and found (stripped and beheaded, to prevent identification) several days later.

The violence (and the fear it generated) attracted the attention of Italian Prime Minister Francesco Crispi, who appointed his Sardinian deputy Francesco Pais Serra to conduct an inquiry into economic conditions and public safety on the island. Although the investigation began to clarify the links between banditry and social issues, concerned public opinion persuaded the government to crack down on banditry. The scientific racist Alfredo Niceforo, in his 1897 essay La delinquenza in Sardegna ("Delinquency in Sardinia"), wrote that banditry in inner Sardinia, and especially in Barbagia, was endemic and rooted in race; the central government decided to send army units to Nuoro to eradicate the problem. The mission was described in officer Giulio Bechi's controversial book, Caccia Grossa ("the Great Hunt"). By the end of the nineteenth century, 197 fugitives and 77 police officers had been reportedly killed in Sardinia. The century's final decade was especially bloody, nearly always related to cattle rustling, robbery, and revenge.

Despite the military intervention, a 1907 disamistade (feud) resulted in 20 murders in Orgosolo. In 1913, on the eve of World War I, there were four murders, 70 attempted murders, 21 robbery-murders, and 138 robberies. The war briefly interrupted the robberies, which resumed after the armistice despite harsh imprisonment and fascist executions. After the death of Samuele Stochino, the fascist government falsely proclaimed the eradication of banditry. In the province of Nuoro from 1932 to 1935, 49 murders, 181 robberies and two kidnappings were reportedly committed; another document, however, recorded 10 murders, 59 robberies and one kidnapping in the first eight months of 1935 alone.

From 1966 to 1969, it was argued that Sardinian banditry was a new form of gangsterism unconnected to the rural past. Police prefects in the fascist regime stressed that the economic and social conditions of the inland areas were at the root of crime in rural Sardinia. Some measures proposed the use of napalm against the bandits, and to deal with the "Sardinian problem" in the same manner as Marshal Rodolfo Graziani did in Libya.

== Political and economic factors ==
Political insurgency, active in Italy since the early postwar years, expanded in Sardinia from the mid-1960s to the 1980s. Contacts between local bandits and left-wing militants and organizations active in communist terrorism such as the Red Brigades and Nuclei Armati Proletari were aided by the detention of left-wing extremists in maximum-security prisons on the island, similar to how Sicilian Mafia members imprisoned in northern Italy began colluding with—and influencing—northern Italian criminal groups near their prisons (giving rise to the Mala del Brenta).

The best-known terrorist movements and paramilitary forces born on Sardinia were "Red Barbagia", the Sardinian Armed Movement and the "Committee of Solidarity with the Deported Sardinian Proletariat Prisoners". Within a decade, socialist and Sardinian nationalist groups took credit for several attacks and kidnappings. Publisher Giangiacomo Feltrinelli attempted to contact Sardinian pro-independence organizations with the intention of forming a communist government modelled on Fidel Castro's in Cuba.

The 19th-century Closures Edict (editto delle chiudende) enclosed uncultivated pasture to promote agriculture and introduced private property. An 1887 trade dispute with France (Sardinia's main importer of cattle) triggered economic hardship, which resulted in the bloody events in inner Sardinia during the century's last decade. In the early twentieth century, cheese production was introduced; this resulted in downward economic mobility for shepherds.

During the early 1960s, the piano di rinascita ("Rebirth Plan") was implemented; it included the construction of factories to modernize an agricultural-pastoral economy into an industrial society. In some areas, the changes have greatly reduced banditry. From the seventeenth to the first half of the nineteenth century, Gallura was heavily affected by crime; after changing from nomadic to sedentary pastoralism, banditry nearly disappeared. In his report, Ignazio Pirastu cites the comune of Oliena. According to a study, the rapid changes eliminated banditry equally rapidly.

== Public image ==
During the late nineteenth century, Sardinians developed a resentment of central authority. Bandits began to be seen not as criminals, but as heroes and liberators; they were seen as defenders against bullying and ill-treatment. The neo-Marxist Antonio Gramsci said that he was fascinated as a boy by Giovanni Tolu, the bandit of Florinas who was made famous by writer Enrico Costa. Poet Sebastiano Satta admired the "beautiful, fierce and brave" bandits. The romantic legend of Sardinian banditry was also documented during the 18th century.

== See also ==
- Anonima sarda
- Graziano Mesina
