= Sardinian Armed Movement =

- Movimento Armato Sardo; Movimentu Armadu Sardu
- Dates active: ca. 1983-1985
- Active regions: Sardinia, Italy; Italian mainland
- Ideology: Sardinian nationalism, Far-left

The Sardinian Armed Movement was a short-lived terrorist movement advocating socialism and political independence for the island of Sardinia. It mainly operated in Sardinia, but also in the Italian mainland, from 1983 to 1985. The group has been inactive ever since.

== Ideology ==
The group wanted to merge the socialist class struggle, elements of local banditry and the separatist aspirations on the island, calling for a "Sardinia for the Sardinians"; they were also against the Italian and American military installations on the island, that were to be sold to the highest bidder. Everything was actually in accordance with Giangiacomo Feltrinelli's ideas, who made a failed plan to turn the island into "the Mediterranean Cuba" in 1968. Some argue that, despite the declared political goals, the group may have been actually common-crime oriented.

== Criminal activity ==
The group claimed responsibility for a number of homicides, bombings and also kidnappings for ransom, although it is believed it operated even more fiercely against the Italian Armed Forces, accused of colonizing the island and destroy the "morality, way of living, and noble traditions" of the Sardinians. Some murders, however, were also performed against some natives besides the so-called Continentals. To name some of their claimed activities, for instance, on 15 June 1983 some bandits barged into a pub in Mamoiada and killed with a handgun the owner Claudio Balia, brother of Pietro Balia (later assassinated in 1984) and Alberto Balia (blown up in a bombing attack carried out on Marsaille in 1991); some days later, Gonario Sale (married with a cousin of Balia) was also murdered nearby his sheepfold. On 5 July Giovanni Bosco, a mainland priest from Benevento, had been found dead by a gas station in Dorgali. They would also carry out a few attacks on the mainland, like on 19 November 1983, when they kidnapped Anna Bulgari and his son Giorgio Calissoni in Latina, Lazio.

== Bibliography ==
- Paola Sirigu, Il codice barbaricino, La Riflessione (Davide Zedda Editore), 2007.
- Giovanni Ricci, Sardegna Criminale, Newton Compton, 2008.
- Il Messaggero Sardo.
