= Gian Piero Galeazzi =

Italian journalist and rower (1946–2021)

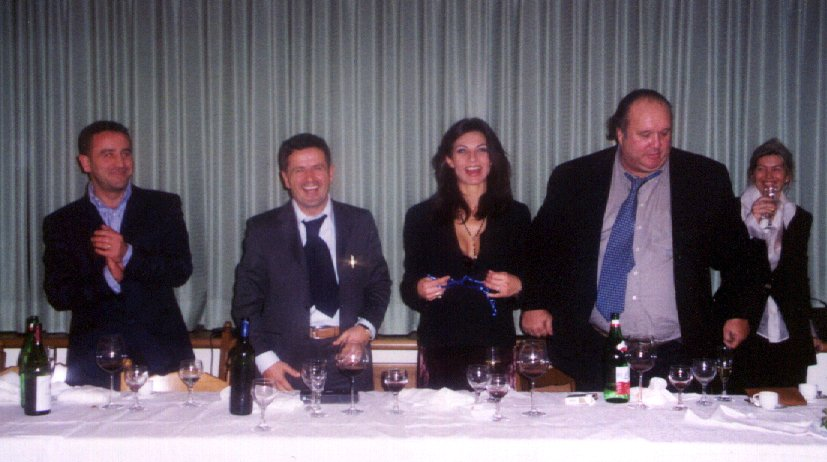
- Galeazzi in 2001
- Born: 18 May 1946; Rome, Italy
- Died: 12 November 2021 (aged 75); Rome, Italy
- Occupations: Rower; journalist
- Years active: 1968–2012
- Height: 192 cm (6 ft 4 in)
- Spouse: Laura
- Children: 2

Gian Piero Galeazzi (18 May 1946 – 12 November 2021), also known as Giampiero Galeazzi, was an Italian competition rower, sport journalist, commentator, and television personality.

== Life and career ==
Born in Rome, Galeazzi graduated in statistics, then he was a competition rower, becoming a junior world champion and participating in the Mexico Olympics in 1968.

In 1972, he was hired by RAI as a sports commentator. Galeazzi went on to work both on TV and radio, following rowing as well as tennis and soccer. In 1992, he was invited to host the RAI sport programme with the highest rating at the time, 90º minuto. From 1994, his role was expanded to co-conductor and entertainer of the variety show Domenica in.

Galeazzi died on 12 November 2021, at the age of 75, due to complications from diabetes.
