= Achille Serra (politician) =

Italian politician

Achille Serra (born 16 October 1941 in Rome) is an Italian policeman, official and politician. He was prefect of Ancona, Palermo, Florence and Rome.

He was a member of the Italian parliament for Forza Italia during the thirteenth legislature, after which he resigned after being elected to the Senate for the Democratic Party in the general election of 2008.
