= Angelo Epaminonda =

Italian mobster (1945–2016)

- Born: 28 April 1945; Catania, Sicily, Italy
- Died: 19 April 2016 (aged 70); Rome, Italy
- Other name: il Tebano
- Occupation: Crime boss
- Parent(s): Paolo Epaminonda; Palma Seminara

Angelo Epaminonda (Catania, 28 April, 1945 – Rome, 19 April, 2016), was an important Italian criminal figure active during the 1970s and 1980s, primarily in the city of Milan. He was the leader of the Milanese branch of the Clan dei Cursoti, a crime group active in Catania, Sicily and independent of the Cosa Nostra.

After his arrest in 1984, he became a state witness, revealing extensive information about Milan’s criminal underworld.

== Biography ==
Born in Catania on 28 April 1945, Epaminonda moved with his family as a child to Cesano Maderno, in the Brianza region, where his father, a stonemason by trade, sought to escape the numerous gambling debts he had accumulated. While still a minor, he impregnated a young woman of Venetian origin and was compelled to marry her. He changed jobs frequently, unable to accept hierarchical structures, and his salary as an employee was insufficient to sustain his growing vices: women, gambling, and cocaine. His second child died of pneumonia at just a few months old, and his relationship with his wife deteriorated further due to his infidelities, prolonged absences from home, and general unwillingness to work.

He began frequenting various clubs and nightspots in central Milan, which were attended by both the city's elite and members of the criminal underworld. He initially engaged in petty scams and a few bank robberies, until he became involved with the powerful gangster of the time, Francis Turatello, then the undisputed king of Milan’s illegal gambling dens. Turatello entrusted him with the management of several of these establishments and introduced him to the upper ranks of the local underworld. His entry into the business world was marked by the opening of the gambling den on Via Cellini, which Epaminonda managed in collaboration with the clan of the Mirabella brothers, nicknamed “Cipudda” (“onion” in Sicilian), who would later become his fiercest rivals.

Between the 1970s and 1980s, Epaminonda led a hit squad composed of Catanese criminals: Jimmy and Nuccio Miano, Salvatore Paladino, Angelo Fazio (known as “the Madman”), Demetrio Latella, Illuminato Asero, among others, collectively referred to as the “Indians,” or the “Apaches.” He took the place of Francis Turatello, who had meanwhile been imprisoned, becoming one of the most powerful gangsters in Lombardy. As a show of power and to send a message to his former boss, Epaminonda had lawyer Francesco Calafiori, Turatello’s long-time legal counsel, murdered, and launched a violent war against the Mirabella clan to claim the criminal inheritance of the dethroned boss.

In the winter of 1979, the infamous Via Moncucco massacre took place at the restaurant La Strega, where the Apulian boss Antonio Prudente, an ally of Turatello, and seven others present were killed. On 23 November 1980, the Epaminonda's hit squad opened fire with pistols and submachine guns on a bar in Piazzale Cuoco frequented by young affiliates of the Mirabella clan, who pursued the attackers for several kilometers, firing wildly into the city traffic. On 18 November 1981, in retaliation for a robbery at one of their gambling dens, the “Indians” carried out the Via delle Rose massacre in the Lorenteggio district, killing three heroin dealers and an unsuspecting gas station attendant who happened to be there by chance.

Epaminonda was first arrested in 1980 for the kidnapping of industrialist Carlo Lavezzani, which had taken place in 1978, but was acquitted due to lack of evidence. Following increasingly frequent police raids that dismantled his illegal gambling operations, he went into hiding. To sustain his criminal enterprise, he turned to the far more profitable cocaine trade, entering into partnership with Camorra member Nunzio Guida. At the peak of their operation, they were trafficking 25 to 30 kilograms of cocaine per month. Seeking to expand his control, Epaminonda set his sights on the lucrative gambling dens of the Romagnol Riviera, between Imola and Riccione. He seized control of all of them, subjugated the operators, and eliminated two individuals, one for refusing to comply with his rules, and the other to send a message to a rival crime group. The victims were Calogero Lombardo and Arcangelo Romano, murdered in 1983 and 1984 respectively: the former was killed on the steps of the Blue Bar in Rimini; the latter was lured from a bar in Igea Marina under false pretenses, murdered, and buried near a river and a bridge in the Faetano area.

=== Arrest ===
On 28 September 1984, the Turin police arrested Salvatore Parisi, a Catanese and prominent member of the Epaminonda gang, while he was in the act of committing a murder. Parisi immediately chose to cooperate with the authorities and revealed the location of Epaminonda’s hideout in Milan. Acting on this information, the officers of Chief Inspector Pietro Sassi’s Mobile Squad managed to enter the apartment without firing a single shot, using only a Catanese dialect code word that Parisi had provided. Upon his arrest, Epaminonda complimented the officers for having discovered the code word and for pronouncing it correctly in dialect. Inside the hideout, the police discovered ten kilograms of cocaine hidden away.

=== From mobster to pentito ===
After his arrest, he became the first pentito (state witness) of organised crime in Milan, confessing to Milanese magistrate Francesco Di Maggio that he had either ordered or been complicit in seventeen murders, and helped reconstruct a total of forty-four homicides. He admitted to managing a large-scale cocaine trafficking operation, in addition to controlling illegal gambling and several casinos, though he claimed he had never allowed even a single gram of heroin to be sold. His revelations enabled Milanese prosecutors to issue 179 arrest warrants, executed during a major police operation on February 19, 1985. Among the high-profile individuals named in the warrants were Giorgio Borletti, two magistrates, and four police officers, accused by Epaminonda of being on his payroll.

The trial of the Epaminonda gang (the so-called "Clan dei Catanesi"), which marked the first maxi-trial in Milan, began on 23 February 1987. Due to the high number of defendants (initially 193, later reduced to 122), the proceedings were held in the bunker courtroom adjacent to San Vittore Prison. The charges included criminal association, mafia-related association, murder, armed robbery, corruption, extortion, illegal gambling, and drug trafficking. On 10 June 1987, the San Vittore bunker courtroom became the scene of a dramatic shootout: one of the defendants, Nuccio Miano, opened fire on his co-defendants Antonino Faro and Antonino Marano, known as the “executioners of the prisons.” However, he ended up wounding only two carabinieri who intervened during the scuffle. The trial concluded on February 8, 1988, with eighty-six convictions, fifty of which resulted in life sentences, and fourteen acquittals. Although the judges acknowledged Epaminonda’s significant contribution to anti-mafia investigations, he was sentenced to thirty years in prison, a sentence later upheld on appeal and by the Court of Cassation. However, he served most of his sentence outside prison, benefiting from legal provisions granted to state witnesses (pentiti).

In 1985, he was accused by another state witness, Salvatore Maltese, of having ordered the brutal murder of Francis Turatello, who was savagely killed in prison on August 17, 1981. However, he vehemently denied the accusation and was ultimately acquitted by the Corte d'Assise in Nuoro.

=== Later years and death ===
In 2007, Epaminonda was released from prison. For security reasons, he changed his personal identity details and relocated with his family to a secret location. He died in April 2016 at the age of 71, but news of his death only surfaced in December of that year.
