= Banda della Comasina =

- Founded: 1970s
- Founder: Renato Vallanzasca
- Founding location: Comasina, Milan
- Years active: 1970s–1987
- Territory: Milan metropolitan area
- Ethnicity: Italian
- Criminal activities: Robbery, weapons trafficking, kidnapping
- Rivals: Turatello Crew

La Banda della Comasina (Italian pronunciation: [ˈbanda della komaˈziːna]; "Gang of Comasina") is the name that the Italian media used to describe a criminal group active in the 1970s in robberies, kidnappings, and weapons trafficking in the northern area of Milan: the Comasina. The area of action included the control of entire neighborhoods in Milan, with the presence of roadblocks controlled by the gang's members, in which policemen were robbed and mocked.

Controlled by Renato Vallanzasca, it was often at odds with the band of Francis Turatello, active throughout Milan and head of many trades. Along with Vallanzasca, the most famous members of the band were: Antonio Colia, Rossano Cochis, Vito Pesce, Claudio Gatti, Carlo Carluccio, and Antonio Furiato. The latter two died in gunfights with policemen, respectively, at Piazza Vetra in Milan, during a site inspection before a robbery, and at the A4 motorway exit of Dalmine, while the gang was going to kidnap a businessman from Bergamo.

The group's most famous criminal action is the seizure of Emanuela Trapani, age 16, who was the daughter of a businessman from Milan. The history of the Banda della Comasina is told in the book Il fiore del male (The Flower of Evil), written by Renato Vallanzasca. Other members of the gang were: Massimo Malinverni, Pino Cobianchi, Michele Giglio, Franco Careccia, Santino Stefanini, Andrea Villa, Salvatore Paglia, Osvaldo Monopoli, Enrico Merlo, Claudio Basanisi, Silvio Zanetti, Antonio Rossi, Vincenzo Di Palma, Massimo Loi, Giuseppe Valfrè, Riccardo Bocchio, Giorgio Monaci, Marco Chiuri, Gian Ambrogio Castiglioni, Giovanni Riva, Salvatore Franco, Giorgio Uraci, Pietro Putignano, Salvatore Rosano, and Gianfranco Casagrande.

== Data protection laws ==
Due to a request under the data protection laws of Europe, Google is no longer able to show the Italian Wikipedia article for the subject in search results visible in Europe. However, when searching for the title, the Wikipedia article is still listed.
