= Enzo Tortora =

Italian TV host (1928–1988)

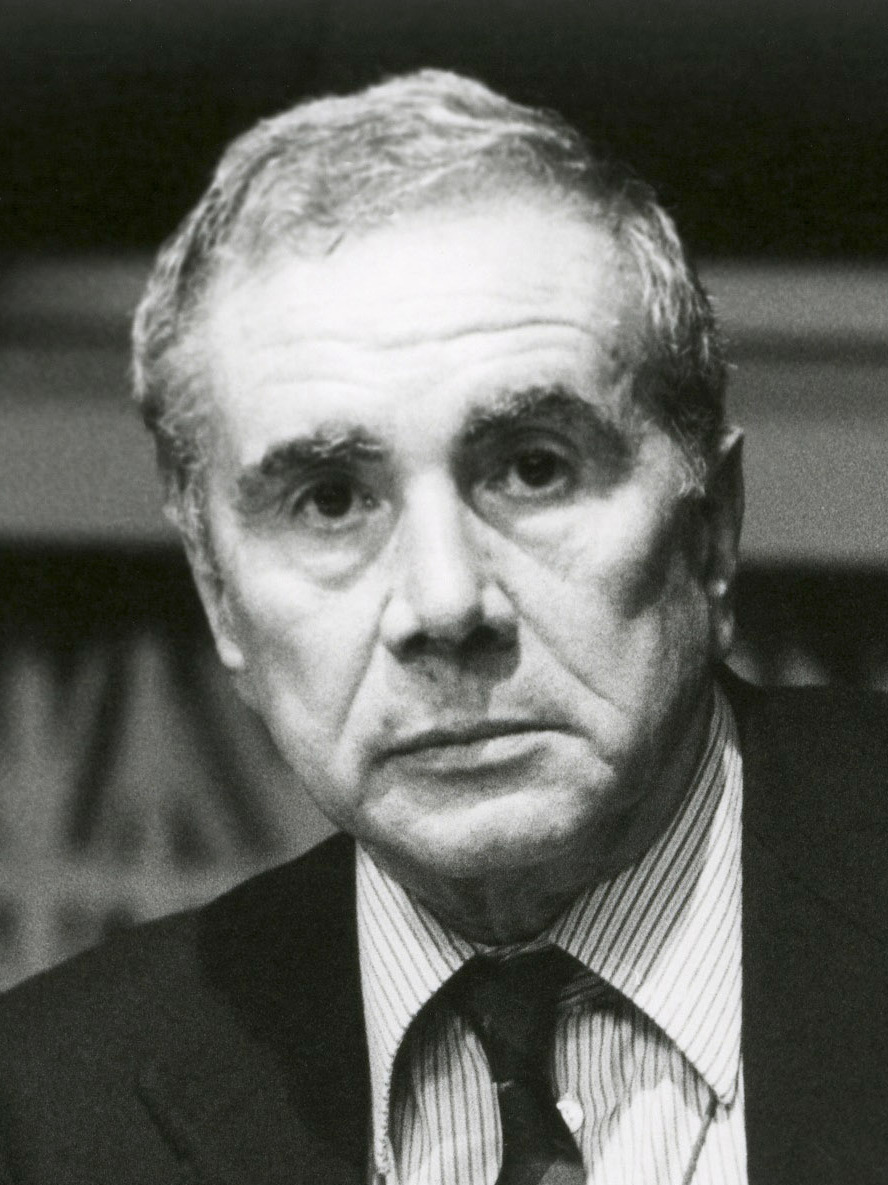

Member of the European Parliament
- In office 24 July 1984 – 13 December 1985
- Constituency: Central Italy

Personal details
- Born: 30 November 1928 Genoa, Kingdom of Italy
- Died: 18 May 1988 (aged 59) Milan, Italy
- Party: Radical Party (1984–1988)
- Spouse: Pasqualina Reillo (m. 1953; div. 1959)
- Education: University of Genoa
- Profession: TV host; politician

Enzo Tortora (30 November 1928 – 18 May 1988) was an Italian television presenter on national RAI television, who was wrongfully accused of being a member of the mafia group known as Camorra as well as drug trafficking in 1985, and sentenced to 10 years in jail. He was acquitted of all charges by the Supreme Court of Italy in 1987.

== Early career ==
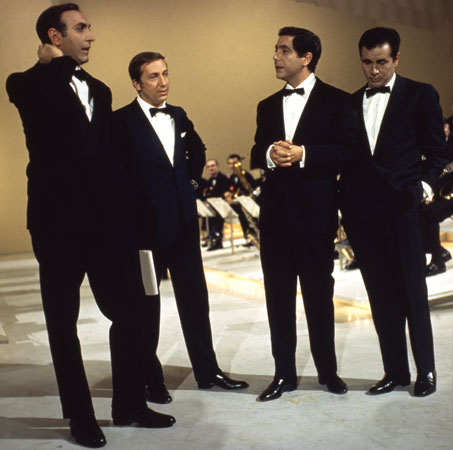
Tortora (on the right) with Pippo Baudo, Mike Bongiorno, and Corrado Mantoni

Tortora was born in Genoa, Italy. After taking a degree in journalism in his native city, he worked in theatre with Paolo Villaggio before joining the RAI, Italy's state radio and television corporation, as a radio announcer. In 1956, he first appeared on television and presented programmes such as Domenica Sportiva and Giochi senza frontiere. In 1969, he was fired by RAI when he described the company's managers as a group of boy scouts trying to pilot a supersonic jet plane unsuccessfully. Subsequently, he worked for several private TV stations and various newspapers, before returning to RAI in 1977.

During the 1970s Enzo Tortora was the co-founder of Telebiella, the first Italian free TV station that broke the state monopoly of TV broadcasting, and later, with his friend Renzo Villa, of Telealtomilanese and Antenna 3 Lombardia.

In 1977, Tortora started to present a programme called Portobello, which attracted an audience of up to 26 million people every Friday night, far outperforming any other programme. Named after the Portobello Road market in London, the show allowed the audience, via telephone from home, to buy or sell things, present ideas or inventions, or look for a partner or someone they had not seen for years. The challenge for those participating in the studio was to get Portobello, the green parrot and mascot of the show, to say his name.

== Arrest and conviction ==
Tortora being led by the carabinieri during his 1983 arrest

On 17 June 1983, he was arrested and held in jail for 7 months after fake allegations by several pentiti of the Nuova Camorra Organizzata, such as Pasquale Barra, Giovanni Pandico and Giovanni Melluso. It was claimed that this was most likely a wrong identification with a man bearing the same surname, but the pentiti continued to accuse Tortora of offences related to cocaine dealing.

He was sentenced to ten years in jail in his first trial held in 1985, being spared further incarceration only thanks to the providential intervention of the Radical Party who offered him a candidacy to the European Parliament, which Tortora won in a landslide as the country divided between those who held him guilty and those who held him innocent.

== Rehabilitation ==
In September 1986, the Court of Appeal of Naples fully acquitted Tortora. In 1987 the Supreme Court definitively affirmed Tortora's total innocence, and took action against those magistrates who had unjustly tried and sentenced him.

After four years, he returned to television, hosting his Portobello show in February 1987. Tortora began the show saying "Well then, where did we leave off?" (Dunque, dove eravamo rimasti?) He developed cancer and died in May 1988 at the age of 59.

== See also ==
- List of miscarriage of justice cases
