= Telekom Austria Czech Republic =

Czech telecommunications company

VOLNÝ, a.s.
- Type: Joint stock company
- Industry: telecommunications
- Founded: 1995; 31 years ago
- Headquarters: Prague, Czech Republic
- Key people: Aleš Zeman
- Products: Internet services, VoIP telephony, fixed line telephony, hosting services, IPTV service
- Website: firma.volny.cz

VOLNÝ, a.s. is a Czech telecommunications company, formerly known as Telekom Austria Czech Republic, a.s. The Dial Telecom Group acquired VOLNÝ in December 2008, when it purchased 100% of the shares in the company from the Austrian company Telekom Austria TA Aktiengesellschaft. Telekom Austria Czech Republic arose out of the merger of Czech On Line, a.s. and ETEL, s.r.o. on 1 October 2007.

The company Czech On Line was founded as an Internet service provider (ISP) in 1995. It was the first commercial ISP in the Czech Republic. In 1999, the company changed the Czech internet market by being the first to provide dial-up internet access for free.

In 2000 Telekom Austria acquired the company Czech On Line, a.s. and transferred it into an alternative telecommunications provider offering all types of fixed line telecommunication services.

The company ETEL, s.r.o. was founded in 1997 and was known as an alternative telecommunication operator offering services mainly in business segment. ETEL has been acquired by Telekom Austria in 2007.
