= E Polis Torino =

- Type: Daily newspaper (from Monday to Saturday)
- Format: Compact
- Owner(s): E Polis
- Founded: 31 March 2008
- Language: Italian
- Headquarters: Turin, Italy
- Website: www.epolistorino.it

E Polis Torino is an Italian local newspaper owned by the San Marino-based publishing company E Polis and based in Turin, Italy.

Although it is not a free newspaper, 70% of copies are distributed free near very busy locations like universities, railway stations, airports, and shopping centres; the paper is also regularly sold at newsstands.
