= Graziano Mesina =

Italian bandit (1942–2025)

Mesina Gang
- Years active: 1966-68, 1970, 1976-1977, 2004-2021
- Territory: Sardinia
- Ethnicity: Sardinians
- Membership: ranging from a few to several dozen members and associates, at various times
- Activities: kidnappings for ransom (until 1977), cocaine and marijuana smuggling, intimidation and extortion, armed robberies
- Allies: Ndrangheta and Camorra, since 2010

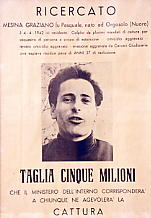
Graziano Mesina

Graziano Mesina (Italian: [ɡratˈtsjaːno meˈziːna], also popularly known as Gratzianeddu in Sardinian; 4 April 1942 – 12 April 2025) was an Italian bandit of the Anonima sarda. He escaped the authorities at least 10 times. He was called the "king of the kidnappers" by The New York Times in 1992. There have been books, songs, and at least one film about him.

== Biography ==
Mesina's father was a shepherd in the Barbagia region of Sardinia. In 1956, Mesina was first arrested at the age of 14 for having a stolen rifle. Four years later, he was arrested again, for shooting in a public place. He was released that same year, but shortly arrested and sent back to prison for attempted murder. He escaped from a prison train in 1962, but was re-captured. That same year he escaped again, this time from a prison hospital. Mesina shot the brother of a man who he thought killed his brother, and was sent to prison for 24 years.

Mesina escaped from prison in 1966 with Miguel Atienza by climbing over a 7.3 m (24 ft) wall and began a kidnapping spree. Mesina was arrested on 26 March 1968. That same year, The New York Times described him as "Italy's most-wanted bandit". After he was arrested a crowd of schoolgirls gathered at the police station with cards saying "I love you" on them. The Tough and the Mighty (1969) is based on his life. In 1970, he watched Cagliari Calcio play football while dressed as a woman. In August 1976, Mesina broke out of Lecce prison with a group of Italian mafia. On 16 March 1977, Mesina was re-captured. He again escaped on 12 April 1985, when he obtained a 12-hour permit to visit his brother in Crescentino. He took refuge in the apartment of Valeria Fusè in Vigevano, but on 18 April, the carabinieri arrested both of them. Transferred to the maximum security prison of Novara, Mesina was sentenced to a further six months in prison, while Fusè was acquitted. On 18 October 1992, Mesina was granted parole and settled in Asti. That year, Mesina helped secure the release of Farouk Kassam, who had been kidnapped. On 4 August 1993, his parole was revoked after police found weapons with Mesina. He was sentenced to life imprisonment.

In July 2003, Mesina asked for a pardon from the President of the Italian Republic, and on 25 November 2004, it was granted. On 24 November 2004, then-President of Italy Carlo Azeglio Ciampi pardoned Mesina, believing he "would turn over a new leaf". Mesina returned to Sardinia and opened a tourism company. On 10 June 2013, Mesina was arrested for drug trafficking. The Daily Telegraph reported that he "offered no resistance". On 12 December 2016, Mesina was sentenced to 30 years imprisonment, and also ordered the revocation of his pardon. Due to the expiry of the terms, Mesina was released on 7 June 2019. On 2 July 2020, Mesina was sentenced to 30 years in prison, but could not be found. In February 2021, Mesina was added to the list of most wanted fugitives in Italy. Mesina was arrested on 18 December 2021 in Desulo and brought to Badu 'e Carros.

Mesina was released from prison on 11 April 2025, due to a diagnosis of terminal cancer. He died the next day at hospital, at the age of 83.

== See also ==
- List of fugitives from justice who disappeared
- Anonima sarda
