= Francis Turatello =

Italian mobster (1944–1981)

- Born: 4 April 1944; Asiago, Veneto, Kingdom of Italy
- Died: 17 August 1981 (aged 37); Nuoro, Sardinia, Italy
- Cause of death: Stabbed to death in prison
- Other name: Faccia d'Angelo
- Occupation: Crime boss
- Children: 1

Turatello crew
- Years active: c.1970 - 1981
- Territory: Milan, Po Valley
- Ethnicity: Italians
- Activities: drug trafficking, pimping, gambling, kidnapping, robbery, extortion
- Allies: Cosa Nostra, Nuova Camorra Organizzata, Banda della Magliana, Banda dei Marsigliesi
- Rivals: Banda della Comasina

Francesco Turatello (4 April 1944 – 17 August 1981) was an important Italian crime figure and mob boss who operated during the 1970s and early 1980s mainly in the city of Milan. He was popularly known by his pseudonym Francis Turatello. His nickname was "Faccia d'Angelo" (Angel Face).

Throughout his criminal career, Turatello was known for maintaining strong connections with the Mafia.

== Biography ==
=== Early career ===
Born in Veneto, Turatello was the son of a maiden seamstress from Asiago in the Province of Vicenza who returned to her hometown during World War II. According to some sources, he is the biological son of Italian-American Frank Coppola, a major drug trafficker with strong ties to the American Mafia. However, this claim is highly likely to be false. In any case, he was Coppola's godson.

Turatello moved with his mother to Milan in his early childhood and settled in the district of Lambrate. He became an amateur boxer in his youth and later made his first appearance in the local Milanese underworld as a petty car thief. Driven by a strong personality and a firm ambition to succeed, he rose up in position and increasingly began taking serious roles, eventually becoming the head of a criminal gang consisting mainly of immigrants from Catania, Sicily.

=== Mob boss ===
His gang sought to control all the clandestine criminal rackets within the city as well as being the sole controller of prostitution. The gang made billions of lire from these rackets, and also participated in several robberies and kidnappings, with the complicity of the Banda dei Marsigliesi, headed by Albert Bergamelli. Turatello was the boss of all illegal rackets in the Po Valley as far north as Milan and was a close protégé of the Mafia.

=== Allies and Rivals ===
Turatello became infamous for his strong rivalry against Renato Vallanzasca which generated a bloody feud with numerous victims on both sides. After both Turatello and Vallanzasca were arrested for their part in the gang war, they reconciled their differences and became close friends. Turatello was the witness to the marriage of Vallanzasca to Giuliana Brusa which was celebrated in prison.

Turatello had close allies and powerful contacts within the Sicilian Mafia, and throughout his criminal career was always in contact with Sicilian Mafiosi and Neapolitan Camorristi. He was a close ally of the Nuova Camorra Organizzata (NCO), headed by Raffaele Cutolo. He was also a trusted friend of Luciano Leggio, the head of the Corleonesi faction of the Sicilian Mafia. Leggio put Turatello in charge of all drug trade in the region of Milan. Turatello has also been linked to many murky incidents of the history of Italy in the 1970s, including the abduction and murder of former Italian prime minister, Aldo Moro, and some criminal acts carried out by the Banda della Magliana of Rome.

=== Arrest ===
After absconding for a long time, Francis Turatello was arrested in 1981 in Piazza Cordusio in Milan. He was tried for a long list of crimes and was sentenced to a long period of detention coupled with a harsh prison time. He was successful in controlling his gang and coordinating his business activities in prison, but his position within the organization was usurped and overtaken by his former right-hand man, Angelo Epaminonda.

=== Assassination ===
On August 17, 1981, during the open yard exercise in the courtyard of Badu 'e Carros, the high security prison in Nuoro, Sardinia, Turatello was ambushed by the NCO hitman Pasquale Barra, Vincenzo Andraous and the well known assassins from Catania Salvatore Maltese and Antonino Faro. Turatello was unable to escape the ambush. Barra and Andraous held Turatello, while Faro and Maltese stabbed him sixty times. In the ensuing confusion from the attack, Andraous was also wounded and would later receive minor surgery in the prison infirmary. The reason for such a terrible killing, indicative of a heavy guilt inside the mob environment, is still unknown now.

The murder was probably ordered by Raffaele Cutolo and the death sentence was passed by Carmela Provenzano, the wife of senior NCO figure Pasquale D'Amico, but there are no evidences of that. The murder of Turatello was done without the consent of the Sicilian Mafia, and as Turatello was a close friend of Luciano Leggio and Frank Coppola, it was an insult to their honor. As a result, the murder brought severe repercussions on the main hitman, Pasquale Barra, and would lead to his defection from the NCO and becoming a pentito. After Turatello's death, his successor Angelo Epaminonda also became a pentito.
