= L'Unione Sarda =

Italian regional newspaper

- Front page, 4 July 2009
- Type: Daily newspaper
- Owner: L'Unione Editoriale
- Publisher: L'Unione Sarda
- Founded: 13 October 1889; 136 years ago
- Political alignment: Centrism; Conservatism
- Language: Italian
- Headquarters: Cagliari, Italy
- Circulation: 68,332 (2008)
- OCLC number: 751755237
- Website: www.unionesarda.it

L'Unione Sarda (lit. 'The Sardinian Union') is a daily newspaper for the island of Sardinia. It is the oldest newspaper in Sardinia still publishing.

== History and profile ==
L'Unione Sarda was first published on 13 October 1889. In its initial phase Raffa Gazia was the publisher of the paper. It was a radical publication and Antonio Gramsci was among the contributors. He published his first article in the paper.

L'Unione Sarda is based in Cagliari and owned by the Italian businessman Sergio Zuncheddu. Its publisher is L'Unione Sarda SPA. The paper has four editions. It has been the first European newspapers with its own website, launched in 1994.

On its 120th anniversary of the establishment a commemorative stamp was published by the post of Italy on 13 October 2009.

In 2004 the circulation of L'Unione Sarda was 66,700 copies. The paper had a circulation of 68,332 copies in 2008.

== See also ==
- List of newspapers in Italy
