= Quarters of Naples =

The districts of Naples

The districts of Naples are the sectors that, within the city, are identified by particular geographical and topographical, functional and historical features.

== Background ==
Through pragmatic sanction issued on 6 January 1779, King Ferdinand IV ordered that the city of Naples be divided into 12 quarters in order to establish and have each of them a judge of the Grand Criminal Court, in order to favor the public safety of the citizens. The 12 districts of the 1779 city division had the following denomination:

- Quartiere di San Ferdinando
- Quartiere di Santa Maria della Vittoria
- Quartiere di Monte Calvario
- Quartiere di San Giuseppe
- Quartiere di San Giovanni Maggiore
- Quartiere di Portanova
- Quartiere di San Lorenzo
- Quartiere dell'Avvocata
- Quartiere della Stella
- Quartiere di San Carlo all'Arena
- Quartiere della Vicaria
- Quartiere del Carmine Maggiore

Over time the neighborhoods have become 30, and although they no longer have any administrative function they continue to be used in everyday language as geographical references. With the resolutions of the municipal council No. 13 of February 10, 2005, No. 15 of February 11, No. 21 of February 16, No. 29 of March 1 and No. 68 of March 21, the city of Naples is divided into 10 municipality. Previously the municipality was divided into 21 circoscrizioni, consisting of 30 city districts.

== Subdivisions ==
Quarter	Circoscrizione (1980-2006)	Municipalità (2006-today)
Arenella	Circoscrizione 11 Arenella	5th municipality
Avvocata	Circoscrizione 08 Avvocata - Montecalvario - San Giuseppe - Porto	Municipalità 02
Bagnoli	Circoscrizione 01 Bagnoli	Municipalità 10
Barra	Circoscrizione 19 Barra	Municipalità 06
Chiaia	Circoscrizione 05 Chiaia - Posillipo - San Ferdinando	Municipalità 01
Chiaiano	Circoscrizione 14 Chiaiano	Municipalità 08
Fuorigrotta	Circoscrizione 02 Fuorigrotta	Municipalità 10
Marianella	Circoscrizione 12 Piscinola - Marianella	Municipalità 08
Mercato	Circoscrizione 07 Mercato - Pendino	Municipalità 02
Miano	Circoscrizione 13 Miano	Municipalità 07
Montecalvario	Circoscrizione 08 Avvocata - Montecalvario - San Giuseppe - Porto	Municipalità 02
Pendino	Circoscrizione 07 Mercato - Pendino	Municipalità 02
Pianura	Circoscrizione 04 Pianura	Municipalità 09
Piscinola	Circoscrizione 12 Piscinola - Marianella	Municipalità 08
Poggioreale	Circoscrizione 17 Poggioreale	Municipalità 04
Ponticelli	Circoscrizione 18 Ponticelli	Municipalità 06
Porto	Circoscrizione 08 Avvocata - Montecalvario - San Giuseppe - Porto	Municipalità 02
Posillipo	Circoscrizione 05 Chiaia - Posillipo - San Ferdinando	Municipalità 01
San Carlo all'Arena	Circoscrizione 09 Stella - San Carlo all'Arena	Municipalità 03
San Ferdinando	Circoscrizione 05 Chiaia - Posillipo - San Ferdinando	Municipalità 01
San Giovanni a Teduccio	Circoscrizione 20 San Giovanni a Teduccio	Municipalità 06
San Giuseppe	Circoscrizione 08 Avvocata - Montecalvario - San Giuseppe - Porto	Municipalità 02
San Lorenzo	Circoscrizione 06 San Lorenzo - Vicaria	Municipalità 04
San Pietro a Patierno	Circoscrizione 16 San Pietro a Patierno	Municipalità 07
Scampia	Circoscrizione 21 Scampia (dal 1992 per scorporo da Secondigliano)	Municipalità 08
Secondigliano	Circoscrizione 15 Secondigliano	Municipalità 07
Soccavo	Circoscrizione 03 Soccavo	Municipalità 09
Stella	Circoscrizione 09 Stella - San Carlo all'Arena	Municipalità 03
Vicaria	Circoscrizione 06 San Lorenzo - Vicaria	Municipalità 04
Vomero	Circoscrizione 10 Vomero	Municipalità 05
Zona Industriale	Circoscrizione 17 Poggioreale	Municipalità 04

== Other toponyms ==
Below is a list of unofficial toponyms (some have been in the past, for example in the law on rehabilitation) relating to areas of Naples known to have not administrative value. Often they are relative districts or small villages once outside the city and subsequently incorporated into the urban fabric.

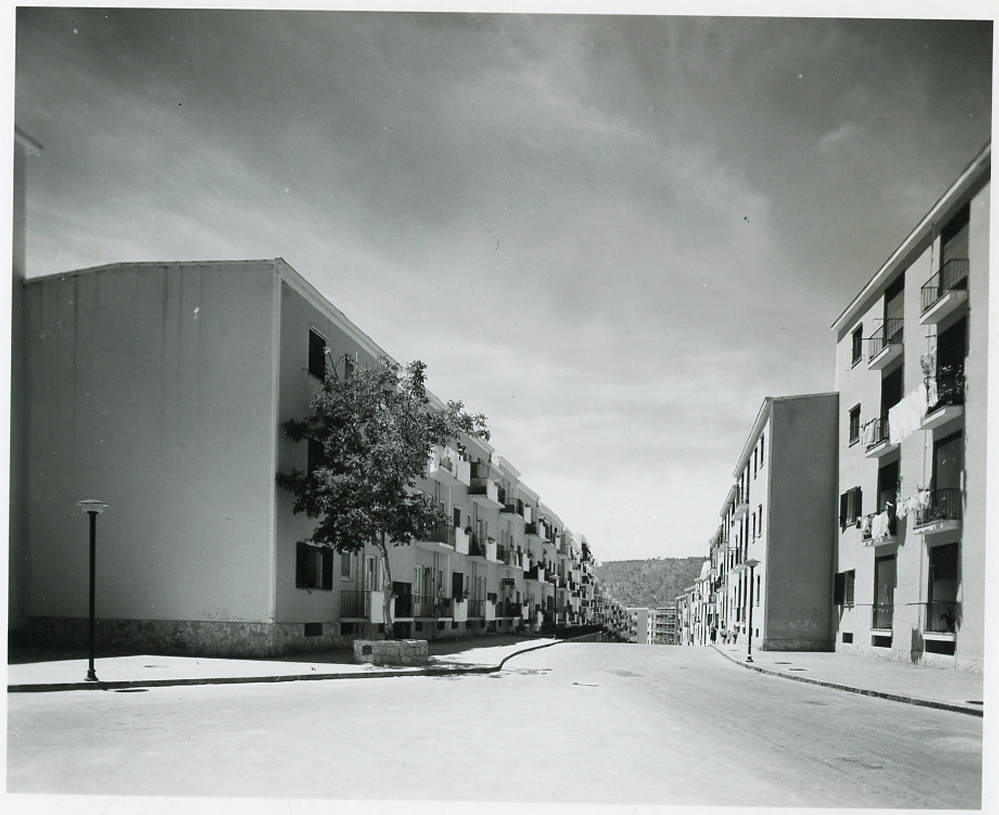
La Loggetta district in a photo by Paolo Monti (Paolo Monti Fund, BEIC)

A

- Agnano
- Antignano
- Arco Mirelli
- Arenaccia

B

- Belvedere
- Borgo dei Vergini
- Borgoloreto
- Borgo Marinari
- Borgo Orefici
- Borgo Santa Lucia
- Borgo Sant'Antonio Abate

C

- Camaldoli and Camaldolilli
- Capodichino
- Capodimonte
- Cariati
- Case Nuove
- Cavalleggeri d'Aosta
- Cavone
- Centro Direzionale
- Historic Centre of Naples
- Colli Aminei
- Coroglio

D

- Doganella
- Duchesca

F

- Forcella
- Foria
- Frullone

G

- Gianturco
- Guantai
- Guantai nuovi
- La Gaiola

M

- Marechiaro
- Materdei
- Megaride
- Mergellina
- Miradois
- Monte di Dio
- Monte Echia
- Montesanto
- Mostra d'Oltremare

N

- Nazaret
- Nisida
- Nuova Shenzou

O

- Orsolone

P

- Pallonetto di Santa Chiara
- Pallonetto di San Liborio
- Pallonetto di Santa Lucia
- Parco San Paolo
- Pasconcello
- Petraio
- Piedigrotta
- Pignasecca
- Pisani
- Pizzofalcone
- Ponti Rossi

Q

- Quartieri Spagnoli
- Quattro palazzi

R

- Rione Alto
- Rione Amedeo
- Rione Amicizia
- Rione Antignano
- Rione Ascarelli
- Rione Carità
- Rione De Gasperi
- Rione Flegreo
- Rione La Loggetta
- Rione Luzzatti
- Rione Sanità
- Rione Sant'Alfonso
- Rione Santa Rosa
- Rione Traiano
- Rione Villa

S

- San Rocco
- Sant'Eframo e Sant'Eframo vecchio
- Sant'Erasmo
- Spaccanapoli
- Spinelli

T

- Tarsia
- Toledo
- Torretta
- Torricelli
- Traccia

V

- Vasto
- Ventaglieri
- Vicarìa vecchia
- Vigliena

Z

- Zona ospedaliera
