= 1st municipality of Naples =

First Municipality of Naples Municipalità 1 Prima Municipalità
- Borough
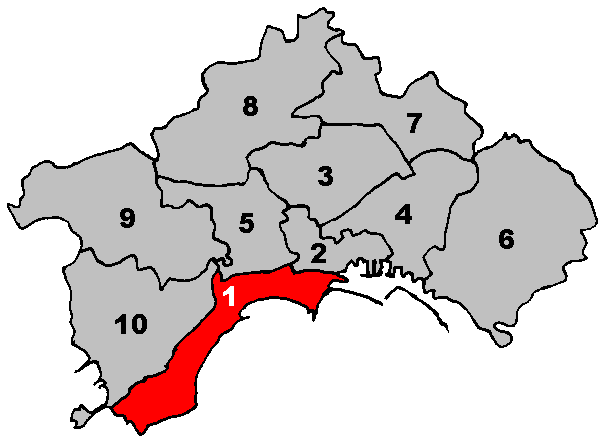
- Location within Naples
- Coordinates: 40°48′20″N 14°12′12″E
- Country: Italy
- Municipality: Naples
- Established: 2005
- Seat: Via Santa Maria degli Angeli a Pizzofalcone, 1

Government
  - President: Fabio Chiosi
  - Vice President: Maurizio Tesorone

Area
  - Total: 8.80 km^{2} (3.40 sq mi)

Population (2007)
  - Total: 84,067
  - Density: 9,550/km^{2} (24,700/sq mi)
- Website: M1 on Naples site

The First Municipality (In Italian: Prima Municipalità or Municipalità 1) is one of the ten boroughs in which the Italian city of Naples is divided. It is the lesser-populated municipality.

== Geography ==
The municipality is located by the coast in the south-western area of the city. It is extended from the western branch of the Port of Naples to the borders with Nisida (part of Bagnoli).

Its territory includes the zones of Mergellina, Piedigrotta, Borgo Santa Lucia, Borgo Marinari, Marechiaro and Rione Amedeo.

== Administrative division ==
The First Municipality is divided into 3 quarters:

Quarter	Population	Area (km^{2})
Chiaia	41,423	2.71
Posillipo	23,311	5.17
San Ferdinando	17,939	0.92
Total	84,067	8.80
