= Stadio Diego Armando Maradona =

Football stadium in Fuorigrotta, Naples, Italy

- UEFA
- Interactive map of Stadio Diego Armando Maradona
- Former names: Stadio del Sole (1959–63); Stadio San Paolo (1963–2020)
- Location: Naples, Campania, Italy
- Coordinates: 40.8280°N 14.1930°E
- Owner: Comune di Napoli
- Capacity: 54,732
- Executive suites: 20
- Surface: Grass
- Record attendance: 90,736 (Napoli v Juventus, 15 December 1974)
- Field size: 110 m × 68 m (361 ft × 223 ft)

Construction
- Groundbreaking: 1952
- Built: 1952–1959
- Opened: 6 December 1959
- Renovated: 1989–1990, 2018–2019
- Architects: Carlo Cocchia, Luigi Corradi

Tenants
- SSC Napoli (1959–present); Italy national football team (selected matches)

Stadio Diego Armando Maradona, formerly known as Stadio San Paolo, is a large multi-purpose stadium in Naples, Italy. Completed in 1959, it is the fourth-largest football stadium in Italy after Milan's San Siro, Rome's Stadio Olimpico and Bari's San Nicola. Originally built with a combination of standing and seating sections, the stadium is currently an all-seater, with a capacity of 54,726. It is the home of SSC Napoli.

Following the death of Diego Maradona, then-mayor Luigi de Magistris and Napoli president Aurelio De Laurentiis proposed renaming the stadium to "Stadio Diego Armando Maradona." The proposal was passed on 4 December 2020.

== History ==
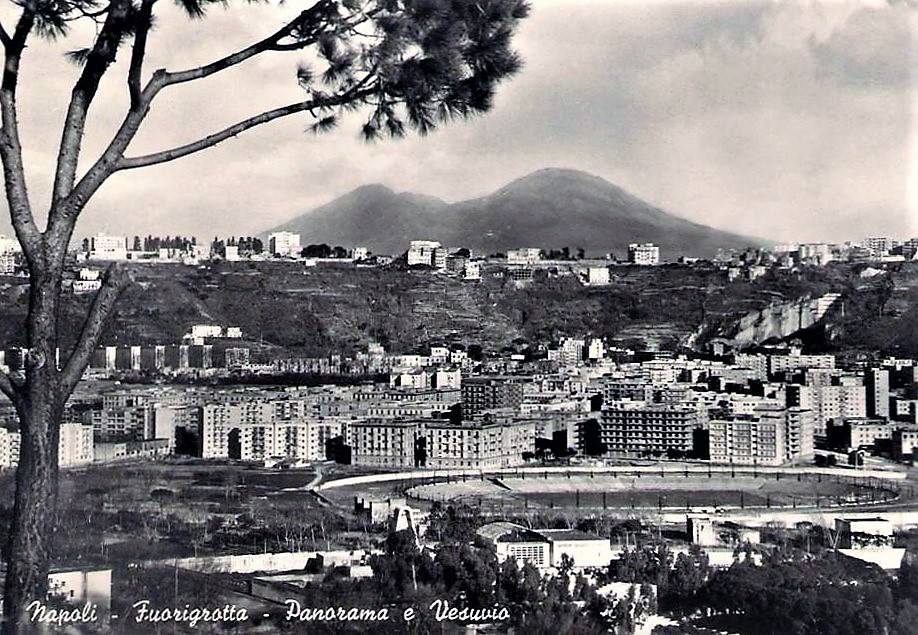
Steel piles are driven into the ground in an ovular shape, used to support the weight of the planned large structure above. The foundation pit is being excavated between the piles, where underground facilities will be held. Construction had only recently begun in this photo.

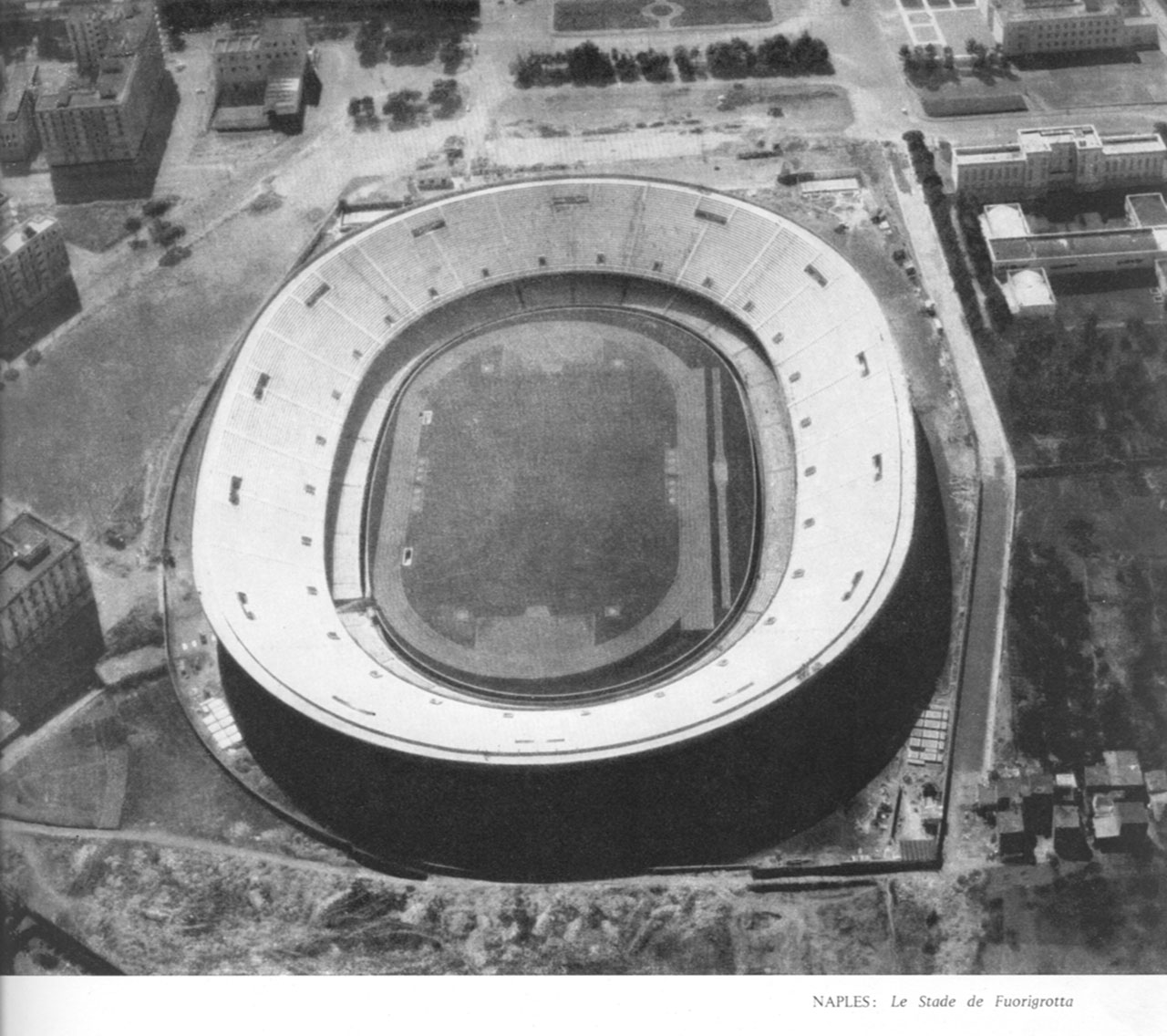
The stadium in 1963, when it was also known simply as Fuorigrotta.

Napoli was in need of a new stadium to replace the Stadio Partenopeo following its destruction in 1942 during the bombing of Naples. They were playing at an undersized venue nearby, which had a capacity of only about 12,000. Fuorigrotta, a rapidly developing suburb to the west, was chosen as the site for the new stadium. Construction began on 27 April 1952 on what would become an open-air stadium made of reinforced concrete, designed to hold approximately 90,000 spectators — most of them standing. The laying of the first cornerstone was attended by then-Prime Minister, Alcide De Gasperi. Construction was prolonged, lasting seven years. It opened as Stadio del Sole ("Stadium of the Sun") on 6 December 1959, with Napoli defeating rivals Juventus 2–1. It was renamed to Stadio San Paolo four years later for Paul the Apostle, who arrived in the area by sea some 2,000 years ago. It held this name for 61 years before its renaming, and many fans still call it some form of San Paolo to this day. On 15 December 1974, Napoli broke the record for the most spectators in attendance for a home match, with 90,736 people in attendance.

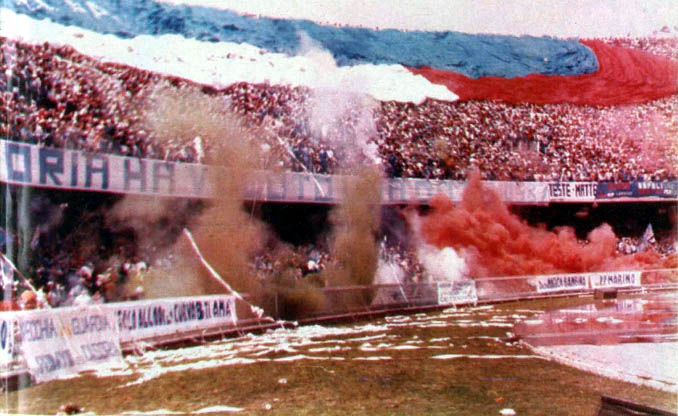
Ultras celebrating in 1987.

The stadium's first renovations were done for the 1980 UEFA European Football Championships, which saw the addition of modern technology such as an electronic scoreboard and a new floodlight system. About a decade later, the stadium then underwent a radical transformation for the 1990 FIFA World Cup, when it was fully converted to an all-seater stadium. The lower tier was reconfigured to allow for a steeper rake, and better views, new dressing rooms were constructed beneath the running track, and red seats were installed throughout, reducing the overall capacity down to about 76,000 people. Underground parking was also added during this time, but logistical issues prevented it from ever opening. The most significant change, however, was the addition of a roof. Supported by twenty-eight equidistant, L-shaped steel pylons surrounding the bowl of the stadium, it was made from translucent polycarbonate panels, semi-circular along the length of the overhanging beams, "like inverted gutters, and triangular in between, creating a sort of concertina effect." A sizeable gap was left between the perimeter of the upper tier and the underside of the roof, allowing in light and providing ventilation.

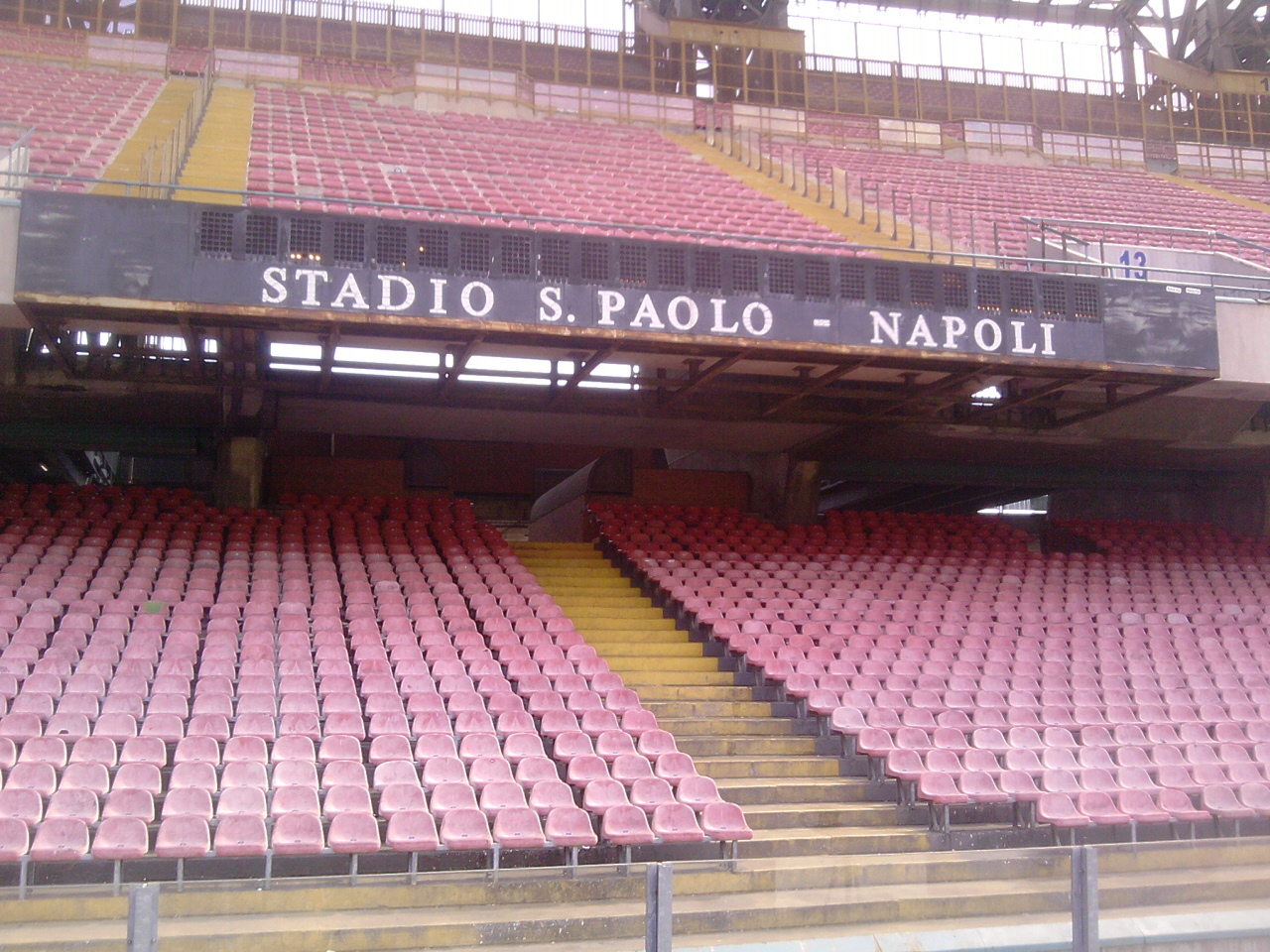
A view from 2010.

After the World Cup, a decline of over two decades struck the stadium. The structure showed signs of age, as the concrete began to peel and the roof started to leak. Fans complained of broken seats, which led to the closure of entire sections and more reductions in seating capacity. Furthermore, the overall lack of modern accommodations for players, fans, and press alike was enough for FIFA to rank the stadium poorly during this time. The city of Naples actually owned the stadium, and so politics and funding issues were sometimes to blame for upgrades being delayed or cancelled. Napoli, who paid rent to the city, found themselves in a financial crisis prior to going bankrupt in 2004. The stadium continued to decay in the following years.

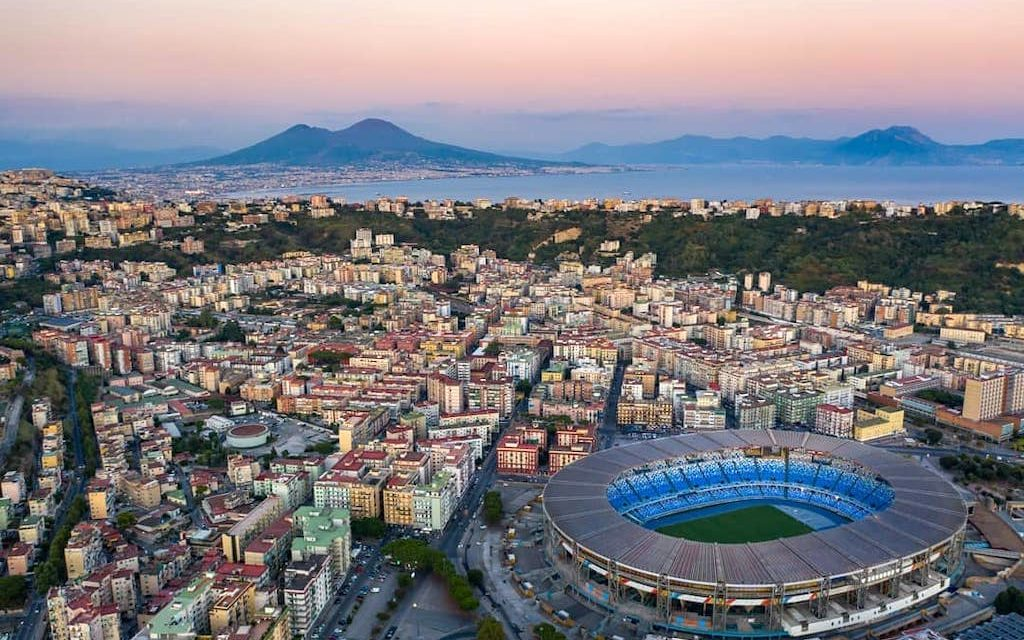
Aerial view of the stadium and adjacent Fuorigrotta neighborhood following 2010s renovations.

Its long-awaited break came between 2018–2019, when €20 million in renovations were made ahead of the XXX Summer Universiade. The locker rooms and press areas were modernized, and improved lighting was installed stadium-wide. The aging seats were replaced with wider seats, and jumbotrons were added in the upper seating areas. Metal railings were also replaced with glass barriers. These additions reduced the stadium's seating capacity once again — from 60,240 to 54,726. On 4 December 2020, the stadium was officially renamed to Stadio Diego Armando Maradona after the former Napoli player's death.

On 26 July 2025, Napoli stated that they would build a new stadium instead of renovating the stadium after it was dropped from hosting UEFA Euro 2032. Redevelopment of the stadium site was approved in February 2026. In June 2026, the city announced that they would push forward with a €200 million redevelopment of the stadium, which would include reopening the stadium’s third tier, removing the athletics track, extending the roof, and increasing capacity from around 54,000 to 70,000. In July 2026, the redevelopment plan was approved after the Technical and Economic Feasibility Project (PFTE) met standards by local authorities. In September 2026, €50 million was given to begin redevelopment of the stadium to have it ready for hosting UEFA Euro 2032.

== Sporting events ==
=== 1990 FIFA World Cup ===
The stadium hosted five matches during the 1990 FIFA World Cup, one of which being a semi-final between Italy and Argentina. The atmosphere was emotionally charged, as Diego Maradona, the superstar of Argentina's national team, also played for Napoli. He was an icon to Naples for bringing the club their first two Serie A titles, among other trophies. The match finished 1–1 after extra time, with Maradona scoring one of Argentina's goals in the ensuing penalty shoot-out to help his country earn the victory.

The matches spanned between 13 June and 3 July, with the first two contests coming from the Group B stage. The other three were a Round of 16 match, a quarter-final, and a semi-final match. Cameroon, who had just shocked the world after beating defending champions Argentina in their opening match, lost a thrilling 3–2 quarter-final to England, after striker Gary Lineker scored a penalty goal in the 105th minute of extra time.

=== XXX Summer Universiade ===
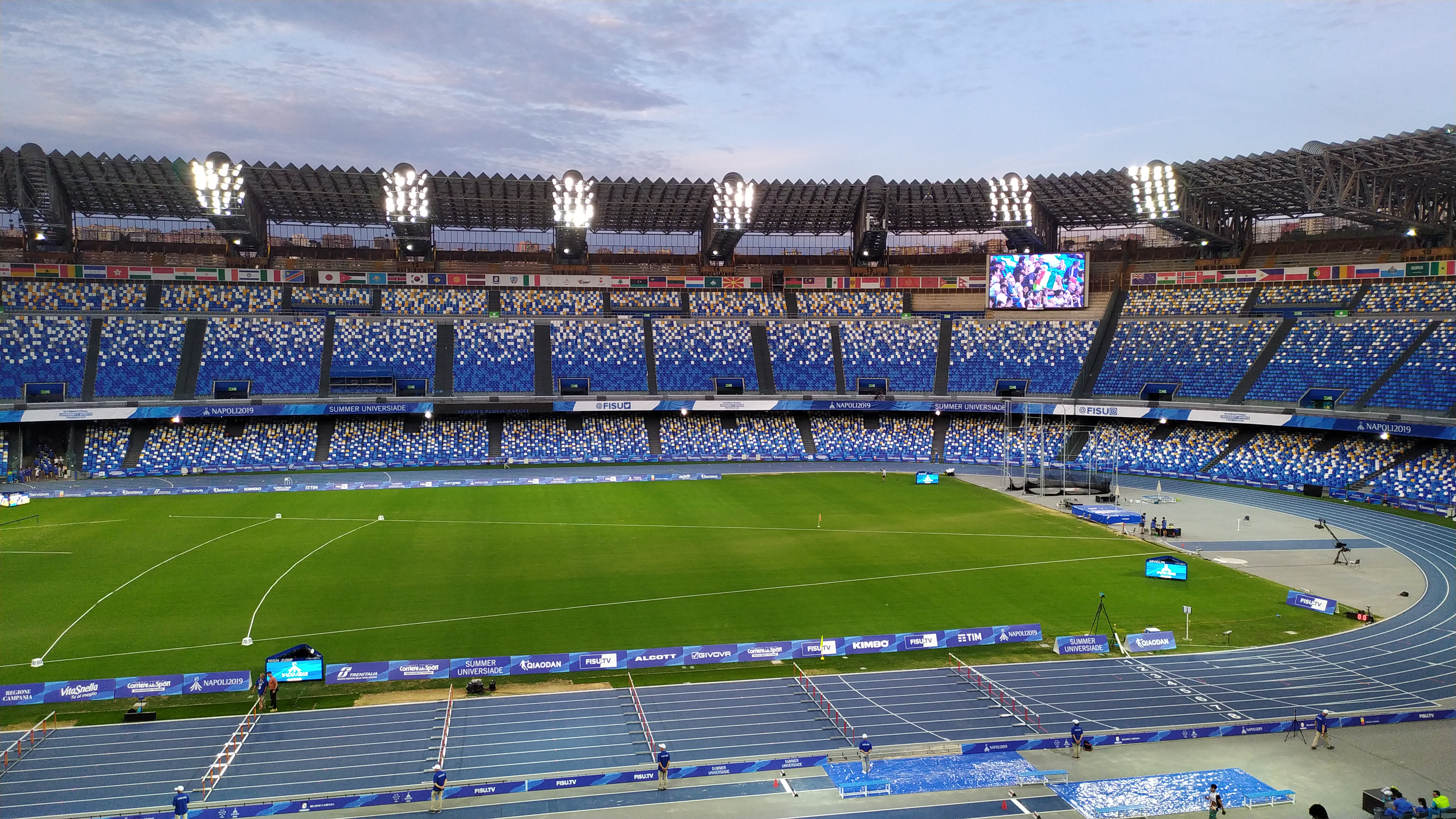
The stadium during the XXX Summer Universiade.

The XXX Summer Universiade, the 30th installment of the FISU World University Games, took place between 3 and 14 July 2019. The opening ceremony featured an appearance by President Sergio Mattarella, Olympic gold-medalist Massimiliano Rosolino, and a performance by Italian tenor Andrea Bocelli.

=== Other events ===
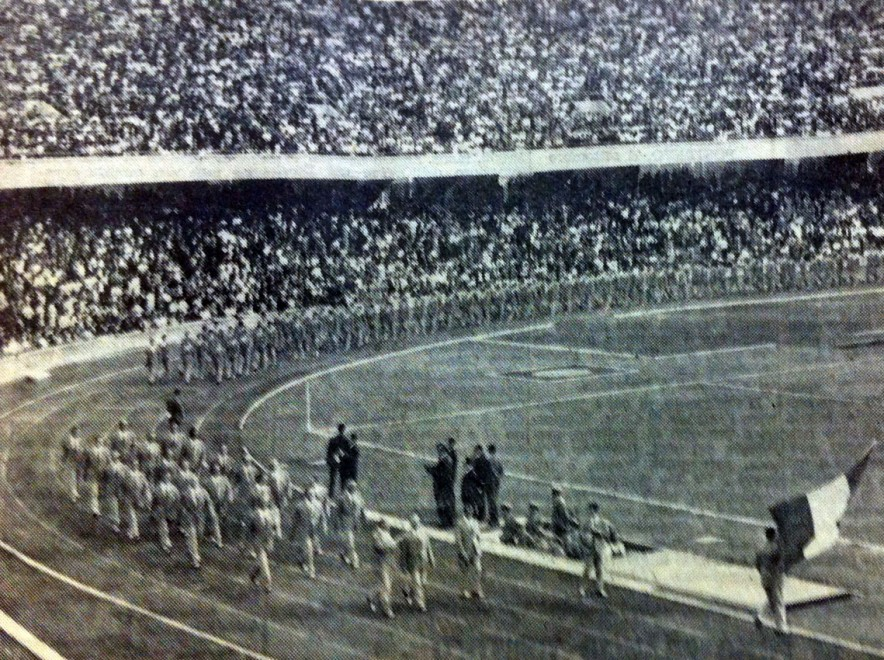
A view of the stadium during the opening ceremony of the IV Mediterranean Games.

The stadium hosted the football preliminaries for the 1960 Summer Olympics.

The IV Mediterranean Games were held from 21 to 29 September 1963.

Italy won the "coin-toss semifinal" against the Soviet Union in the 1968 UEFA European Football Championship here, in front of 68,582 spectators.

The stadium hosted four matches during the 1980 UEFA European Football Championship.

On 2 September 2006, Italy's Euro 2008 qualifier against Lithuania was played here.

== Concerts ==
The stadium has hosted many well-known acts in its lifetime. Italian pop band Pooh held a celebration concert in 1979 to honor their 1,000th live show. In 1982, The Rolling Stones played to a sold-out crowd during their European Tour 1982. Zucchero and U2 performed within a month of each other in 1993, and in 1998, Neapolitan artist Pino Daniele performed in front of a sold-out crowd in what some fans consider a top concert of his career. In 2023, Coldplay played two sold-out shows, during their Music of the Spheres World Tour.

Date	Artist	Tour/Event	Attendance	Notes
24 July 1979	Pooh	Tour Viva	50,000	The band celebrated their 1000th concert.
12 July 1982	Frank Zappa with vocals by Massimo Bassoli	1982 European Tour		Italian rock journalist Massimo Bassoli provided vocals.
17 July 1982	The Rolling Stones	European Tour 1982/Tattoo Tour	90,000	
12 June 1993	Zucchero	L'urlo Tour		Guests Andrea Bocelli and Jenny B performed.
9 July 1993	U2	Zoo TV Tour	76,000	
24 September 1996	Eros Ramazzotti	Dove c'è musica Tour		
7 June 1997	Gigi D'Alessio		20,000	The tour supported his new album Fuori dalla mischia.
14 June 1998	Eros Ramazzotti	Eros World Tour 1998		
18 July 1998	Pino Daniele	Pino Daniele in Concerto 1998	80,000	Guests Jovanotti & Raiz (former member of Almamegretta) performed.
8 July 2001	Eros Ramazzotti	Stile Libero Tour		
26 July 2002	Pino Daniele, Francesco De Gregori, Fiorella Mannoia, & Ron	In Tour (2002)		
14 September 2002	Ligabue	Live 2002		
25-26 June 2022	Ultimo	Ultimo Stadi 2022 – La Favola Continua		Both nights were sold out.
21-22 June 2023	Coldplay	Music of the Spheres World Tour		Both nights were sold out.
28 June 2023	Tiziano Ferro	TZN 2023	43,000	Tickets reportedly sold-out within minutes.
21 June 2025	Imagine Dragons & Declan McKenna	Loom World Tour	37,393	
5 June 2026	Liberato	Stadio Maradona Liberato	45,000	
