= Pianura =

Coordinates: 40°52′N 14°11′E

- Quarter of Naples
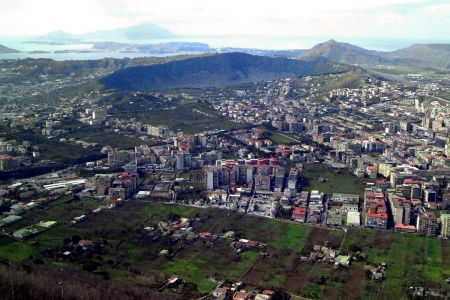
- Panorama of Pianura

- Location of Pianura within Naples
- Country: Italy
- Region: Campania
- City: Naples
- Municipalità: 9th

Area
  - Total: 11.45 km^{2} (4.42 sq mi)

Population
  - Total: 57,821
  - Density: 5,050/km^{2} (13,080/sq mi)
- Demonym: pianuresi
- Postal code: 80126

Pianura (Italian: "plain") is a western quarter of Naples, Italy. It is bounded on one side by the Soccavo quarter and on the other side by the outskirts of the town of Pozzuoli.

== Personalities ==
- Giustino Russolillo (1891-1955), presbyter

== See also ==
- Vocationist Fathers
