= 10th municipality of Naples =

Tenth Municipality of Naples Municipalità 10 Decima Municipalità
- Borough
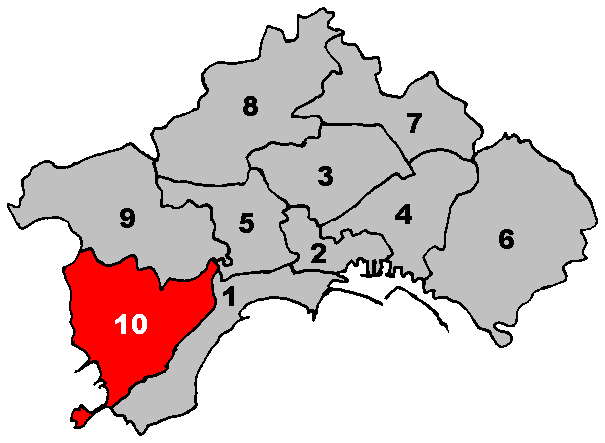
- Location within Naples
- Coordinates: 40°49′5.22″N 14°9′50.11″E
- Country: Italy
- Municipality: Naples
- Established: 2005
- Seat: Via Acate, 65

Government
  - President: Diego Civitillo

Area
  - Total: 14.16 km^{2} (5.47 sq mi)

Population (2007)
  - Total: 101,192
  - Density: 7,100/km^{2} (19,000/sq mi)
- Website: M10 on Naples site

The Tenth Municipality (In Italian: Decima Municipalità or Municipalità 10) is one of the ten boroughs in which the Italian city of Naples is divided.

== Geography ==
The municipality, part of the area of Campi Flegrei, is located in the western suburb of the city and borders with Pozzuoli.

Its territory includes the zones of Agnano, Nisida, Coroglio and Astroni.

== Administrative division ==
The Tenth Municipality is divided into 2 quarters:

Quarter	Population	Area (km^{2})
Bagnoli	24,671	7.96
Fuorigrotta	76,521	6.20
Total	101,192	14.16
