= Rione Traiano =

Neighbourhood in Naples, Italy

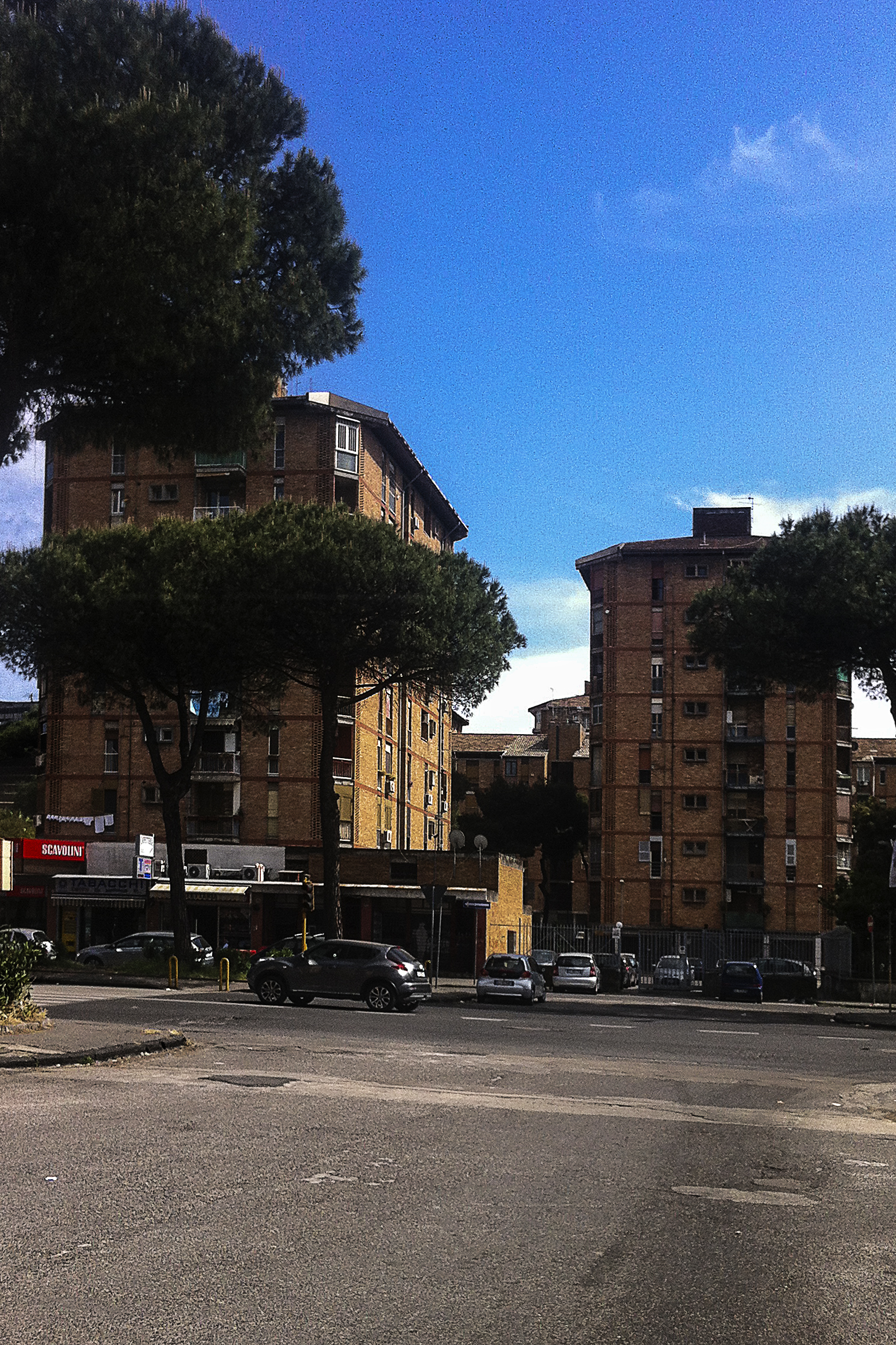
Rione Traiano

Rione Traiano is a neighbourhood in Naples, of public housing located in the south-west area of the city of Naples, which acts as a connection between the Soccavo and Fuorigrotta districts.

== Services ==
Built in the 1960s, it is mainly made up of public housing. There are not many services, however we find the presence of the Circumflegrea (Traiano station) which connects the neighborhood with the Historic Centre of Naples, bus lines and the Azzurro shopping center (formerly San Paolo) and various supermarkets, the local market, of the municipal park called "Parco Costantino", of schools, of a kindergarten, of the efficient multifunctional center and many other buildings.

== Bibliography ==
- Sergio Stenti, Napoli moderna – Città e Case popolari 1868–1980, Clean edizioni, Naples
- Sergio Stenti e Vito Cappiello, NapoliGuida – 14 itinerari di architettura moderna, Clean Edizioni, Naples
- Eduardo Alamaro, "Scuola-Laboratorio, un'esperienza di progettazione della comunità con i ragazzi del rione Traiano di Napoli", Emme edizioni, Milan, 1976
