= Bombing of Naples in World War II =

Allied Bombing of Naples
- Part of World War II
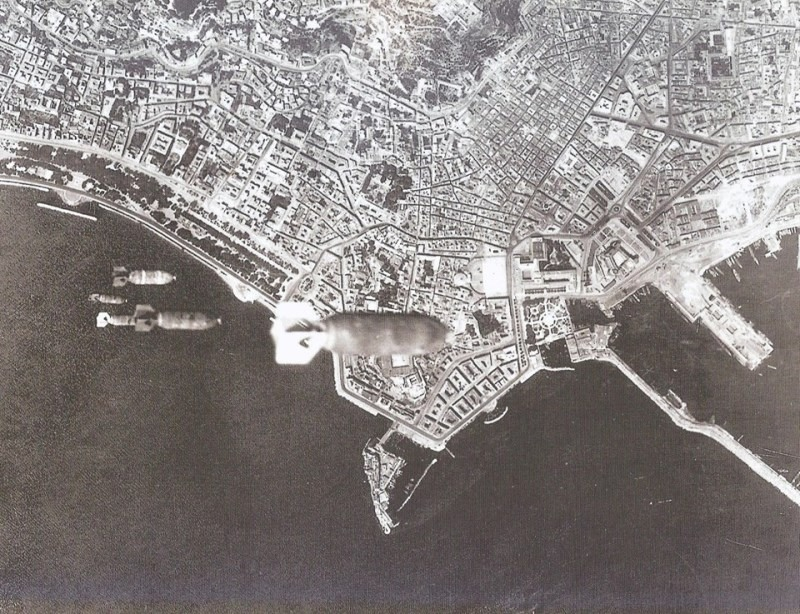
- Naples under bombardment in 1943
Date	1940-1944
Location	Naples 40°50′N 14°15′E
Result	Strategic Allied victory

Belligerents
Allies	Fascist Italy

Casualties and losses
	20,000 - 25,000 civilians

During World War II the Italian city of Naples suffered approximately 200 air raids by the Allies from 1940 to 1944; Milan was the only Italian city attacked more frequently. Almost all of the attacks — a total of 181 — were launched in the first nine months of 1943 before the Four days of Naples and the Allied occupation of the city at the beginning of October. Estimates of civilian casualties vary between 20,000 and 25,000 killed.

== Background ==
Naples was a major strategic objective in the Mediterranean and Middle East theatre of World War II and the Italian campaign. Its port was a principal trading connection to Africa, as well as a center of industry and communication. Naples also harbored an Italian military fleet, like the cities of Taranto and La Spezia. As the first large Italian city in the way of the Allies' Operation Avalanche, Naples increased in importance in 1943.

In Naples, the primary targets were the port facilities at the extreme eastern end of the Port of Naples as well as the rail, industrial and petroleum facilities in the eastern part of the city and the steel mill to the west, in Bagnoli.

== The first years of WWII ==
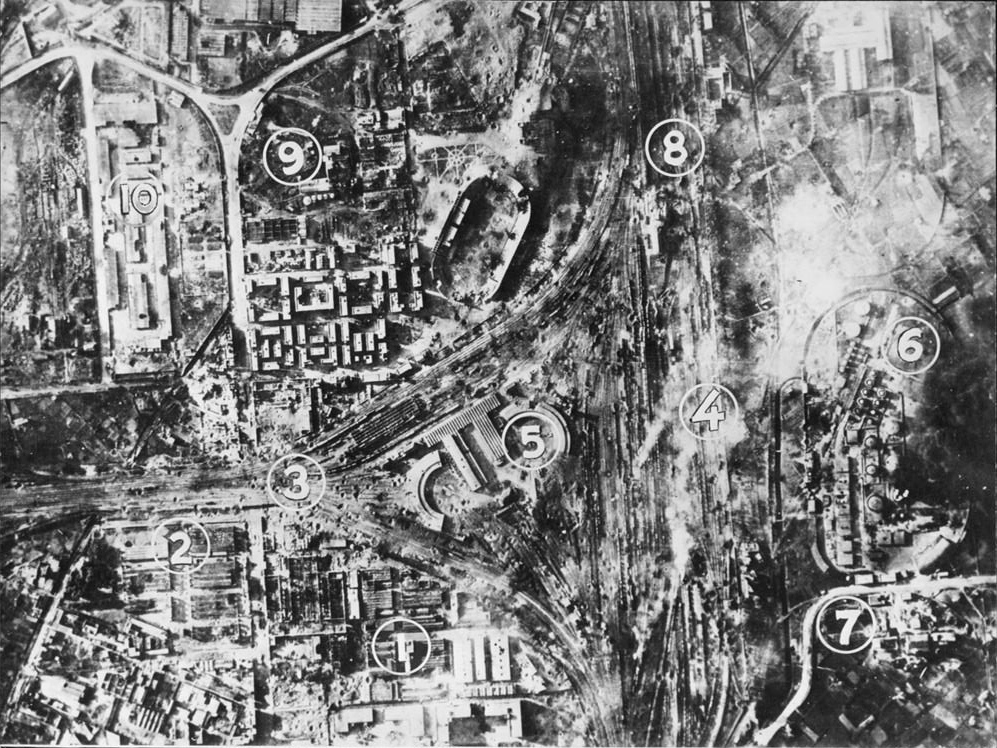
1941 aerial photograph showing damage to the port of Naples

The French bombing began with four bombardments between 10 and 15 June 1940. The first British bombardment (after aerial reconnaissance) began on 1 November 1940, between the hours of 4:20 and 6:20 in the morning. It was conducted by the Bristol Blenheim light bombers of the Royal Air Force from their base in Malta. Several days later came the Battle of Taranto, also in southern Italy. These first bombardments struck, above all, the Zona Industriale (for the fuel and refineries there) and areas near the Napoli Centrale railway station.

The following bombardments concentrated on the port and ships, also near the Zona Industriale, which included the neighborhoods of San Giovanni a Teduccio, Bagnoli, Pozzuoli. Naples, as a whole, was not yet fortified against attack: the city had few air raid shelters and the only anti-air weapons it had were the ship cannons in the port.

The next bombing came on 8 January 1941, and lasted around three hours. It damaged the port and the areas of Lucci and Borgo Loreto. The British continued bombing on 10 July, destroying a refinery, and 9 and 11 November they targeted the central rail station, the port, and factories. Another raid on 18 November killed many civilians when a palazzo collapsed on an air raid shelter in Piazza Concordia.

In 1942, there were six bombings that resulted from a change in the Allies' bombing strategy. The Allies changed from strategic bombing that primarily targeted military objectives to targeting infrastructure and industrial targets. They also began carpet bombing to demoralize the city and inspire revolt, by distributing bombs uniformly over the city and causing many civilian deaths.

With United States Army Air Forces Consolidated B-24 Liberators joining in on 4 December 1942, the bombing also began to take place during the day. They struck three cruisers, the Muzio Attendolo, Eugenio di Savoia, and the Raimondo Montecuccoli, but also many houses, churches, hospitals, and offices, including the Palazzo delle Poste and the area of the Porta Nolana. Several days later, another attack destroyed the hospital Santa Maria di Loreto and killed 900 people.

On 7 December, all the schools were closed and the city began to evacuate, creating a flood of displaced people. The city's air raid shelters, carved into the Naples underground geothermal zone, also began to fill. Citizens also dug their own shelters or found shelter in metro stations or tunnels. Meanwhile, the frequency of bombing had increased.

== Bombing in 1943 ==
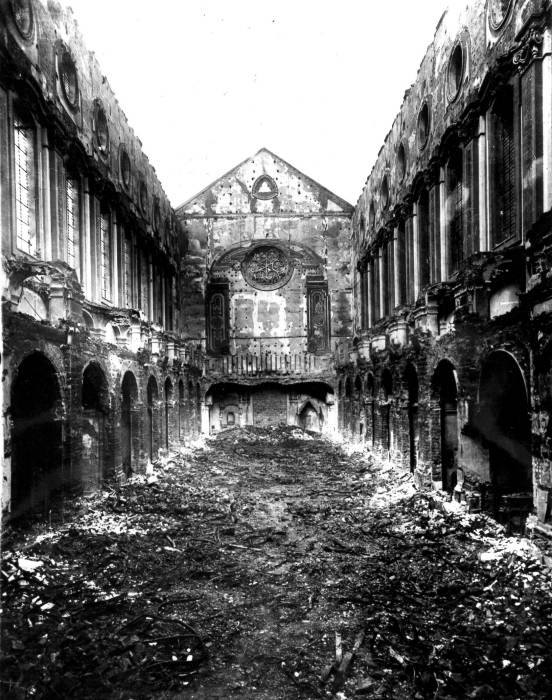
Destroyed interior of the Santa Chiara basilica in August 1943

By 11 January 1943, the Allies were conducting daily bombings that only began to slow at the end of May, five months later. Usually, after completing their bombardments, the planes would descend to strafe the city.

On 21 February, known as La strage di via Duomo (transl. "The massacre of via Duomo"), the entire Via dei Tribunali was destroyed. In March, the neighborhoods of Carmine, Pignasecca, Piazza Cavour, and Capodimonte were all hit. On 28 March, the passenger ship Caterina Costa was hit, killing 600 and wounding 3000. In April, the neighborhoods of Corso Giuseppe Garibaldi, via Depretis, Piazza Amedeo, Parco Margherita, via Morghen, and Via Medina were all struck by bombs.

The largest raid was on 4 August 1943, by 400 American Boeing B-17 Flying Fortress aircraft of the Northwest African Strategic Air Force (NASAF) which targeted the Axis submarine base at Naples. The Church of Santa Chiara was destroyed in this raid but was later rebuilt. Many ships in the harbour were sunk, yet the harbour was made functional in just one week after the city's occupation by Allied ground forces.

On 6 September, with the Armistice of Cassibile already signed, another bombing of Naples began. The last bombardment happened on the morning of 8 September, a few hours after the announcement of the armistice.

The Nazi occupation of Naples ended 20 days later with the popular insurrection of the Four Days of Naples. The insurrection, however, did not end the city's bombardments. Naples became the rearguard of the Winter Line and the Luftwaffe began bomb runs against the city. The largest Nazi bombings happened on the nights of 14 and 15 March 1944, and killed 300 people.
