= 9th municipality of Naples =

Ninth Municipality of Naples Municipalità 9 Nona Municipalità
- Borough
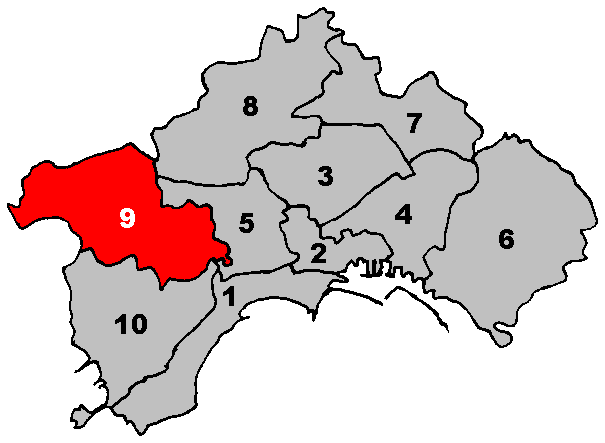
- Location within Naples
- Coordinates: 40.8583°N 14.1703°E
- Country: Italy
- Municipality: Naples
- Established: 2005
- Seat: Piazza Giovanni XXIII, 2

Government
  - President: Lorenzo Giannalavigna

Area
  - Total: 16.56 km^{2} (6.39 sq mi)

Population (2007)
  - Total: 106,299
  - Density: 6,400/km^{2} (17,000/sq mi)
- Website: M9 on Naples site

The Ninth Municipality (In Italian: Nona Municipalità or Municipalità 9) is one of the ten boroughs in which the Italian city of Naples is divided.

== Geography ==
The municipality is located in the north-western suburb of the city and borders with Marano di Napoli, Quarto and Pozzuoli.

Its territory includes the zones of Guantai, Rione Traiano, La Loggetta, Torre Caracciolo and Masseria Romano.

== Administrative division ==
The Ninth Municipality is divided into 2 quarters:

Quarter	Population	Area (km²)
Pianura	58,362	11.45
Soccavo	47,937	5.11
Total	106,299	16.56
