= Giustino Russolillo =

Italian presbyter (1891–1955)

Saint Giustino Russolillo SDV
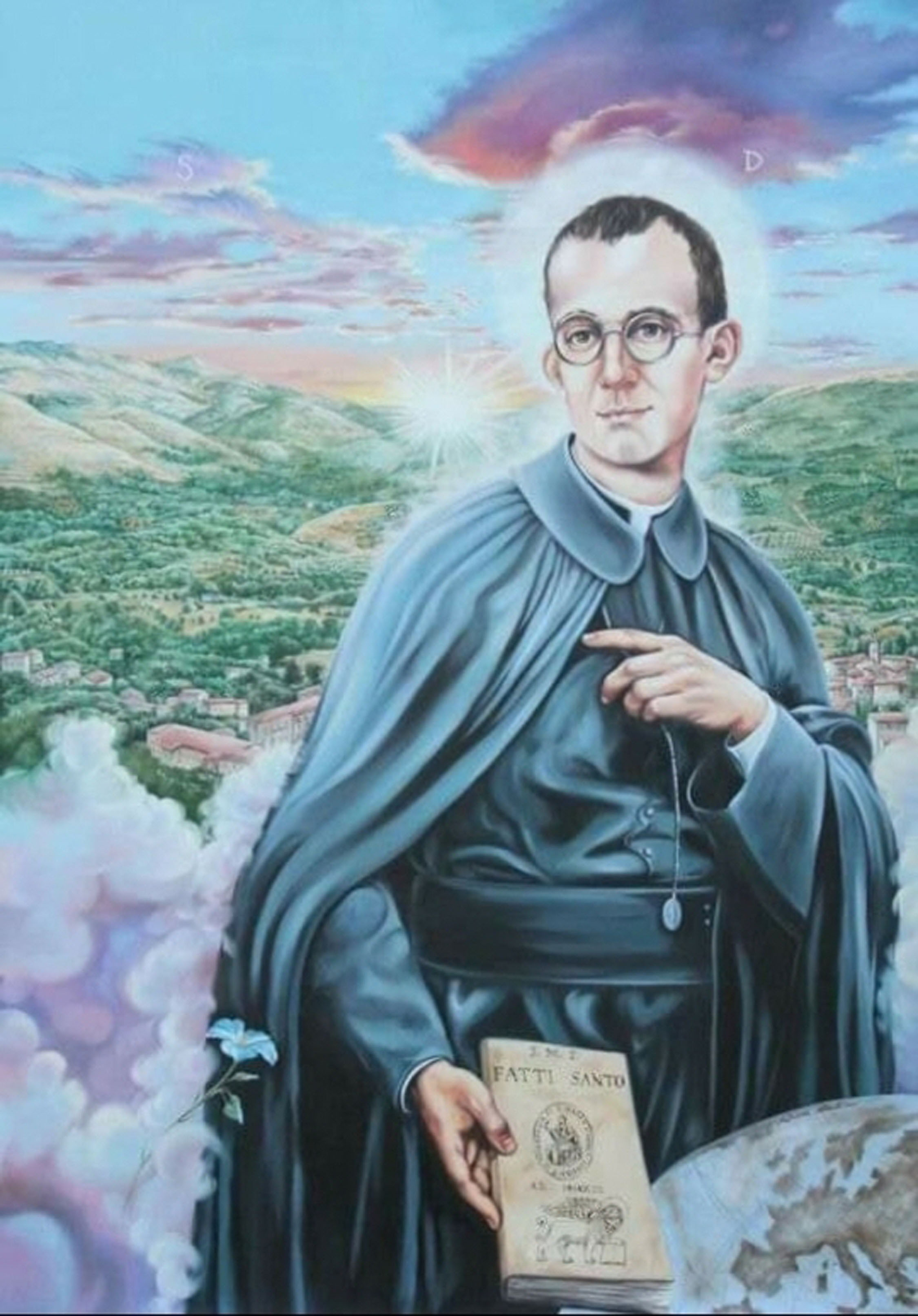

Priest
- Born: 18 January 1891; Pianura, Naples, Kingdom of Italy
- Died: 2 August 1955 (aged 64); Pianura, Naples, Italy
- Venerated in: Roman Catholic Church
- Beatified: 7 May 2011, Comunale Pallucci Street, Pianura, Naples, Italy by Cardinal Angelo Amato
- Canonized: 15 May 2022, Saint Peter's Square, Vatican City by Pope Francis
- Feast: 2 August
- Attributes: Priest's cassock
- Patronage: Vocationist Fathers; Vocationist Sisters; Apostles of Universal Sanctification

Giustino Russolillo, SDV (Giustino Maria della SS. Trinità in religion; 18 January 1891 – 2 August 1955) was an Italian Catholic priest and the founder of the Vocationists, the Vocationist Sisters and of the Secular Institute of the Apostles of Universal Sanctification.

Russolillo was a pastor at St. George Parish in Pianura, where he was born, and dedicated his life to promoting, cultivating and educating young people about God's call in their life. In doing so, he help young people to fulfill their religious vocation to priesthood and consecrated life.

Russolillo was beatified under Pope Benedict XVI on 7 May 2011 and the ceremony of beatification was presided over by the Pope's delegate, Cardinal Angelo Amato, Prefect of the Vatican Dicastery of the Causes of Saints. On 27 October 2020, Pope Francis promulgated a decree approving a miracle attributed to Russolillo; this enabled for him to be canonized on 15 May 2022.

== Life ==
Giustino Russolillo was born in Pianura in 1891 as the third of ten children to Luigi Russolillo and Giuseppina Simpatia. He was baptized the date after his birth, when an exceptional snowfall arrived in Pianura. While his name in the parish register was recorded as Giustino, his civic record had his name recorded as "Giustino Pietro Orazio". Giovanna, his sister, joined his female order and became the first Superior General, while his brother Ciro also entered the Vocationist and became a priest. His brother Michael became a doctor and helped him in his final month.

He received his first communion in 1896 and received private instruction from his paternal aunts as well as the priest Orazio Guillaro instructing him in Latin. Once he completed his studies in Pozzuoli to become a priest – he was there since 1901 – he was ordained as priest on September 20, 1913. On his ordination he vowed to establish a religious congregation for promoting vocations to the priesthood and to religious life. On 30 April 1914 – with a group of men that had been in formation (as a seminarian he used to teach catechism in his town and he found in some of them some true signs of vocation and continued to give them formation even after becoming a priest) – he tried to set up a small group dedicated to this but this did not last too long.

He was appointed as the parish priest of San Giorgio's church in Pianura in 1920 and took possession of it on 20 September. On 18 October 1920 he started the Vocationist Fathers and on 2 October 1921 also founded the Vocationist Sisters. The Vocationist Fathers received diocesan approval on 26 May 1927. On 18 January 1931 he made his vows into the order to the Bishop of Capaccio Francesco Cammarota and assumed his new name. The Vocationist Sisters became an order of pontifical right on 24 May 1947 and the Vocationist Fathers became one as such on 3 January 1948. But before these two approvals could be given both orders needed an official apostolic visit: Raffaele Baldini of the Servants of Mary undertook one in 1941 and then the Franciscan Serafino Cuomo undertook the second in 1945 after the end of World War II. In 1950 he sent three priests to the missions in Brazil to open a branch of the order there.

In spring 1955 he collapsed several times due to ill health and – on the advice of Doctor De Simone – did not lead the procession for the Corpus Christi on 9 June and on 16 July was instructed by Doctor Cataldi to rest at the Monaldi Hospital in Naples; but from 20 to 27 July he visited novices from his orders with Raffaele Castiglione. A blood test taken a short time later confirmed that he was dying from leukemia and his mother Giuseppina and his sister rushed from Rome to be with him around this point; he was hospitalized on 1 August.

Russolillo died from leukemia on 2 August 1955 in Pianura at 9:10 pm after receiving the Last Rites. His remains were later reinterred on 14 April 1956 in the motherhouse of the Vocationist Fathers at Pianura. Russolillo's orders now serves in many nations: in Latin America (Brazil, Argentina, Chile, Ecuador, Colombia), in Africa (Nigeria, Madagascar, South Africa), in Europe (Italy, United Kingdom, France), North America (United States of America, Canada) and in Asia (India, Philippines, Indonesia, Vietnam) as well as in Australia

== Sainthood ==
The beatification process commenced on 15 December 1977 under Pope Paul VI after the Congregation for the Causes of Saints issued the official "nihil obstat" to the cause and titled the late Russolillo as a Servant of God while transferring the location of the beatification process from Pozzuoli to Naples on 7 July 1978.

Theologians approved the dossier on 7 February 1997 while the C.C.S. did likewise on 18 December 1997. Pope John Paul II named Russolillo as being Venerable on 18 December 1997 after he confirmed that the late priest lived a life of heroic virtue.

The process for a miracle spanned from 16 March 2005 to 14 November 2005 and was validated on 9 March 2007 before receiving the approval of a medical board on 18 June 2009 and that of theologians on 12 December 2009; the C.C.S. followed suit on 1 June 2010. Pope Benedict XVI approved it on 1 July 2010 and Cardinal Angelo Amato beatified Russolillo in Naples on 7 May 2011 on the pope's behalf.

Pope Francis in 2020 confirmed a second miracle attributed to him (the healing of the Vocationist religious brother Emile Rasolofo in Madagascar). It was announced on 9 November 2021 that Francis would canonize Russolillo and several others on 15 May 2022.

== Works ==
- The writing of Blessed Justin have been collected in 27 Volumes of the "Opera Omnia", in Italian. Many books of the Opera Omnia have been translated in English as well. Some more prominent books are:
- Ascension
- Spirit of Prayer
- Let us make man part I
- Let us make man, part II
- For Mental Prayer
- Consecrations
- Costuitutions
- Letters, I, II, III
- Journey toward the Espousal Union
- Longing for love
- Among the prayer books that he wrote and are now used by his religious congregations are:
- Offertories of the Most Precious Blood
- Devotional
