= Our Lady Queen of Apostles Church, Heston =

Catholic church in Heston, England

Coordinates: 51°29′18″N 0°22′20″W

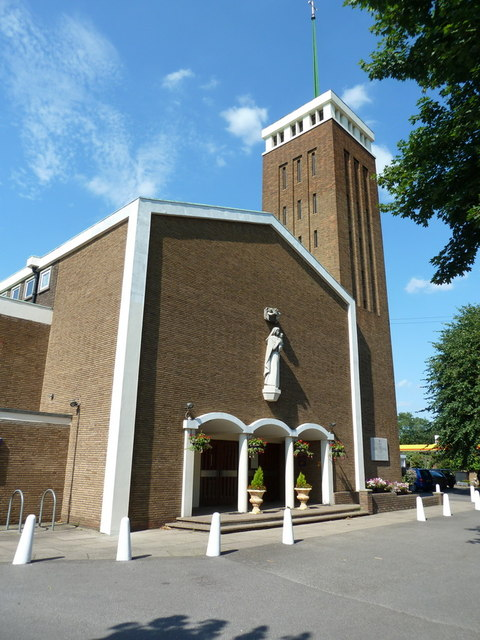
Front of church

Our Lady Queen of Apostles is a Catholic church in Heston in the London Borough of Hounslow. It is situated between The Green and Heston Road, opposite Rosary Catholic Primary School. Built in the early 1960s, it contains stained glass designed by Pierre Fourmaintraux and is in a local conservation area.

== History ==
Originally, the local catholic community was served by the White Fathers from a small church in the area. They founded the parish in the 1928, and built the original church in the area in 1929, but left it to the care of the diocese in the 1960s. With the growing population, the church was too small, so a larger one needed to be built. The new church was to be built on the site formerly occupied by the Missionary Sisters of Our Lady of Africa. On 13 July 1963, the foundation stone was laid and the church was opened in 1964. It was designed by Burles, Newton & Partners, who also designed St Francis de Sales Church in Hampton Hill and Upper Teddington, cost £42,000 and has capacity for 450 to 500 people. It was consecrated on 19 May 1974.

On 1 October 2017 the Vocationist Fathers came to the parish and continue to serve there today.

== Parish ==
In 1972, Rosary Catholic Primary School was built, which continues its relationship with the local church.

== See also ==
- Archdiocese of Westminster
