= Bagnoli =

Coordinates: 40°48′50.24″N 14°9′57.33″E

- Quarter
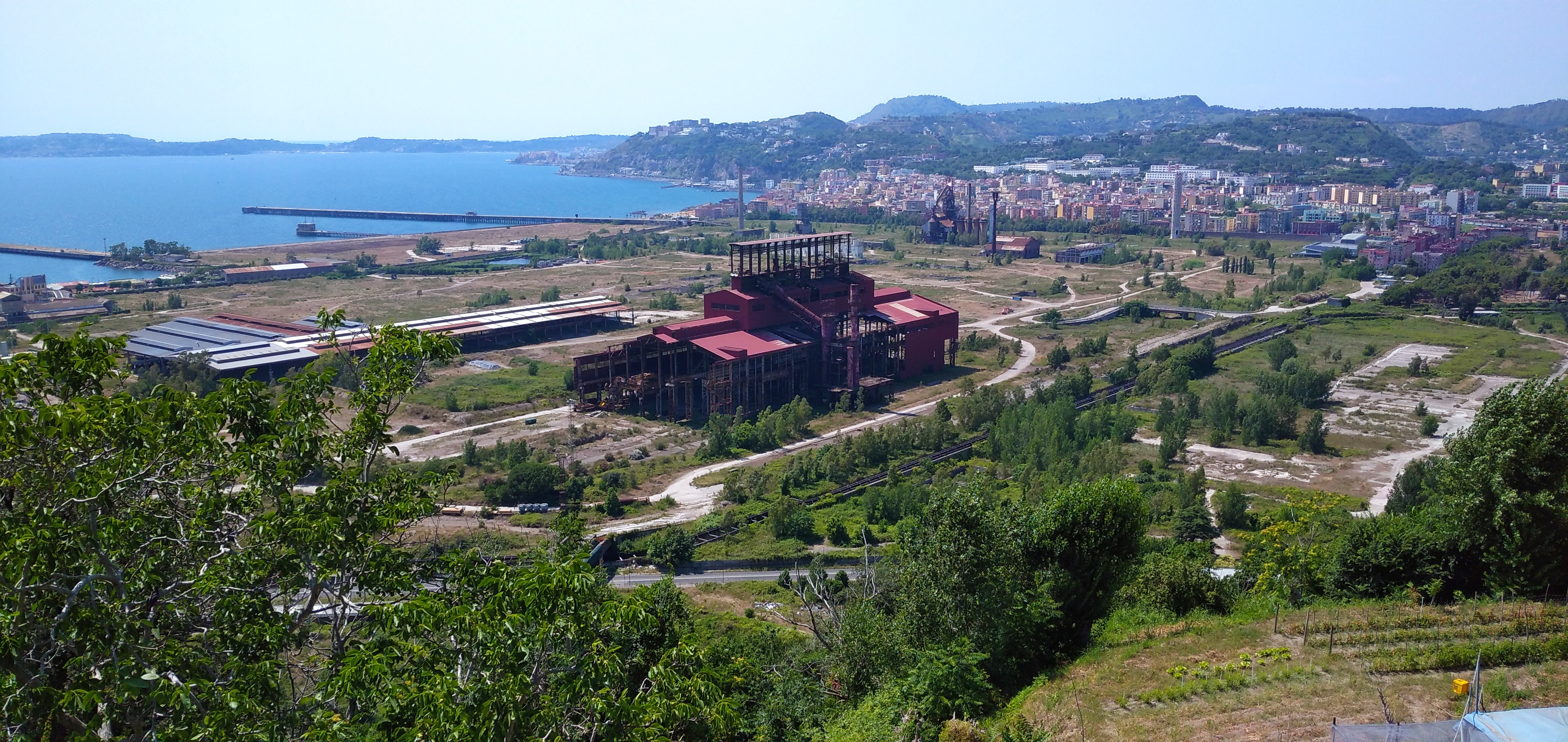

- Location of Bagnoli within Naples
- Country: Italy
- Region: Campania
- City: Naples
- Circoscrizione: 10th

Area
  - Total: 7.96 km^{2} (3.07 sq mi)

Population
  - Total: 23,333
  - Density: 2,930/km^{2} (7,590/sq mi)
- Demonym: bagnolesi
- Postal code: 80137

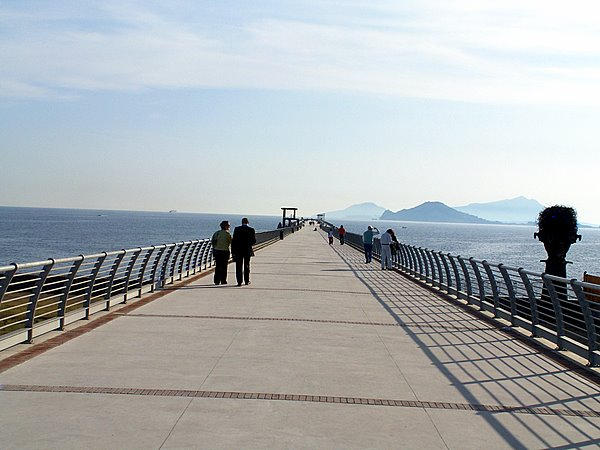
The converted industrial pier, now a public promenade, in Bagnoli.

Bagnoli (Neapolitan: Bagnole) is a western seaside quarter of Naples, Italy, well beyond the confines of the original city. It is beyond Cape Posillipo and, thus, looking on the coast of the Bay of Pozzuoli.

== Industrialization and World War II ==
Bagnoli was one of the sites of Naples' industrialization in the early 20th century, with the construction of a steel mill. During World War II Bagnoli was damaged as a result of the bombings of Naples.

After World War II, Bagnoli was overbuilt by virtually uncontrolled construction and then suffered urban decay. The first decade of the 21st century saw the removal of the steel mill and some improvement in the physical and visual landscape of the area, including the construction of a public educational facility and convention center called Città della Scienza ("Science City") as well as the conversion of the long ex-steel-mill industrial pier to a public promenade.

== Bagnoli Displaced Persons Camp ==
Between 1946 and 1951 Bagnoli was the site of a Displaced Persons camp run by the International Refugee Organization. The complex occupied by the camp was originally built to provide a home for young people in need by the Bank of Naples Foundation on the occasion of the four hundredth anniversary of its foundation. The facility, "Collegio Costanzo Ciano", was a novelty in the field of social architecture in that it responded to the need to "ensure intellectual and political education, physical training and gymnastics". It contained schools, dormitories, infirmaries, workshops, sports building, a church and the theater, all set in a pleasant landscape setting.

The project, designed by Francesco Silvestri, was divided into a series of terraces facing south which required substantial earthworks. The area chosen extended about 320 thousand square meters and was located between the district of Bagnoli, the slopes of the adjoining hills and the boundaries of site of the Triennial Exhibition of Overseas Italian Territories (Italian: Triennale d'Oltremare) at Fuorigrotta. The complex was designed to house approximately 2500 students of both sexes.

The work lasted a little over a year and was completed in April 1940 to coincide with the completion of the exhibition. On May 9, 1940 Victor Emmanuel III officially opened the College and the Triennial Exhibition.

The facility was occupied by the Italian War Ministry until 1942 when it was turned over to Gioventù Italiana del Littorio, the youth movement of the Italian Fascist Party, later, to the Germans for an Officer Candidate School until 1943.

In 1944 it became an Italian orphanage. In mid-February 1944, the 765th US Squadron occupied the site.

After World War II, it was used as a Displaced Persons camp, housing between 8,000 and 10,000 refugees, mainly from Eastern Europe, who were being processed for immigration to various countries including Argentina, Australia, Canada, and the USA. At one time there were complaints about disease and children dying.

Bagnoli was one of the sites targeted by Operation Keelhaul, the Allied operation to identify and repatriate Soviet military collaborators who were located in Allied-occupied Northern Italy. A part of the overall program of repatriation of Soviet citizens after World War II, the operation was carried out by British and American Allied Force Headquarters forces in Italy and Allied-occupied Austria. Running from 14 August 1946 and 9 May 1947, Operation Keelhaul transferred about 1,000 military collaborators to the Soviet side. This was the last Allied forced repatriation of Soviet citizens in the aftermath of World War II.

Relocation of Allied Forces Southern Europe (AFSOUTH) to the area previously occupied by the camp at Bagnoli started in January 1953, and the new complex was formally activated on 4 April 1954, the day of the 5th anniversary of the North Atlantic Treaty.
