= Vocationist Sisters =

The Sisters of the Society of the Divine Vocations, more commonly known as The Vocationist Sisters, is a Congregation of Catholic Sisters founded by Fr. Justin Russolillo in the year 1921.

They presently work in Italy, France, Brazil, Argentina, United States, the Philippines, India, Nigeria, Madagascar and Indonesia. Their field of work is: apostolate in the parishes, schools and missions aimed at identifying and guiding young people who seem to show signs of divine call to consecrated life.

The Vocationist Sisters take the simple vows of poverty, chastity and obedience. They believe in and practice a strong and steady community life and wear a religious habit.
