= Vocationists =

Religious congregation

Society of Divine Vocations
- Societas Divinarum Vocationum (Latin)
- Abbreviation: S.D.V. (post_nominal letters)
- Nickname: Vocationists
- Formation: October 18, 1920; 106 years ago
- Founder: St Giustino Maria Russolillo, S.D.V.
- Founded at: Italy
- Type: Clerical Religious Congregation of Pontifical Right (for Men)
- Headquarters: Via Cortina d'Ampezzo 140, 00135 Rome, Italy
- Members: 546 members (345 priests) as of 2021
- Superior General: Rev. Fr. Antonio Rafael do Nascimento, SDV
- Ministry: Vocationaries, parishes, missions and schools apostolates.
Countries served
Australia Argentina Brazil; Canada; Chile Colombia Ecuador; France; India	Indonesia Italy Madagascar Nigeria Philippines Spain; South Africa United Kingdom U.S.A.
- Parent organization: Catholic Church
- Website: www.vocationist.net

The Society of Divine Vocations (Latin: Societas Divinarum Vocationum) abbreviated S.D.V., also commonly known as the Vocationists, is a Catholic clerical religious congregation founded by Fr Giustino Russolillo in 1920.

== See also ==
- St Winefride's Church, Holywell
- St Mary's Church, Walsall
- Our Lady Queen of Apostles Church, Heston
