= Naples underground geothermal zone =

Italian underground structures and tunnels

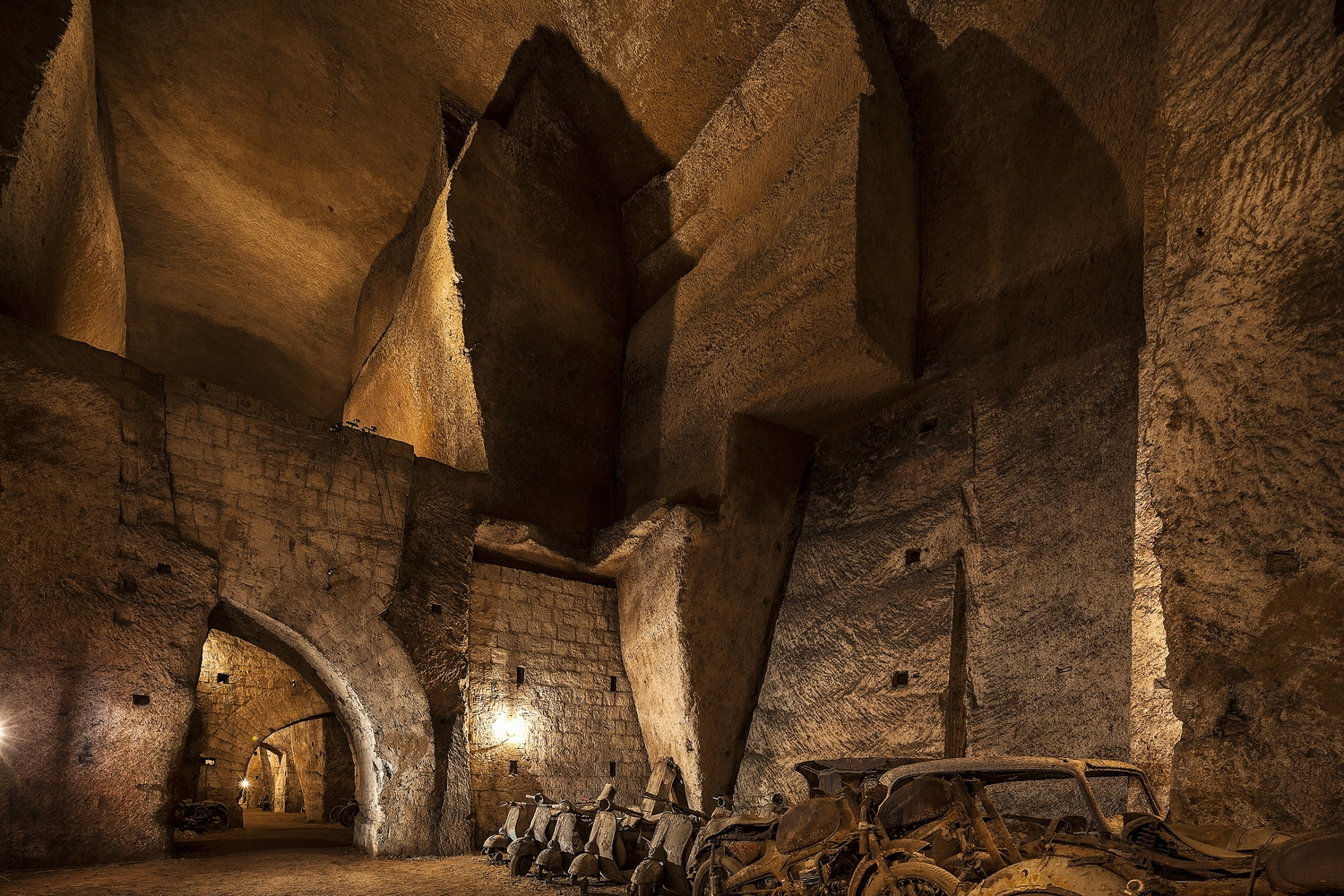
Underground Naples

Running beneath the Italian city of Naples and the surrounding area is an underground geothermal zone and several tunnels dug during the ages. This geothermal area is present generally from Mount Vesuvius beneath a wide area including Pompei, Herculaneum, and from the volcanic area of Campi Flegrei beneath Naples and over to Pozzuoli and the coastal Baia area. Mining and various infrastructure projects during several millennia have formed extensive caves and underground structures in the zone.

== Geology ==
Over millennia, extreme geothermal pressure has helped form a strong, durable tuffaceous volcanic sandstone called tuff, a rock composed of compressed and compacted volcanic ash ejected during a volcanic eruption. The entire Naples area is a geothermal region with deep veins of the tuff sandstone, generically referred to as "yellow tuff". It runs in deep veins beneath Naples and the area around it in strata which are found at different depths.

== Mining and subterranean structures ==
Tuff is strong and easily worked, making it an ideal building material. Tuff was mined through access and removal shafts called the occhio di monte, ("eye of the mountain"). Through these shaft, gigantic blocks of tuff were quarried and pulled up. The resulting void was a bottle shaped cavity with sloping shoulders, which provided ample reinforcement to prevent future cave-ins. After the tuff was quarried it was used as building material during roughly the Angevin, Aragonese and Bourbon periods.

The resulting caverns were later used to form water reservoirs into which water was diverted from the main aqueducts, and the Ancient Greeks dug long and elaborate aqueducts beneath the city more than 2,500 years ago. These provided fresh water to the villas and palaces above through use of the deep reservoirs and cisterns. Well shafts were also dug offering community access to the reservoirs below.

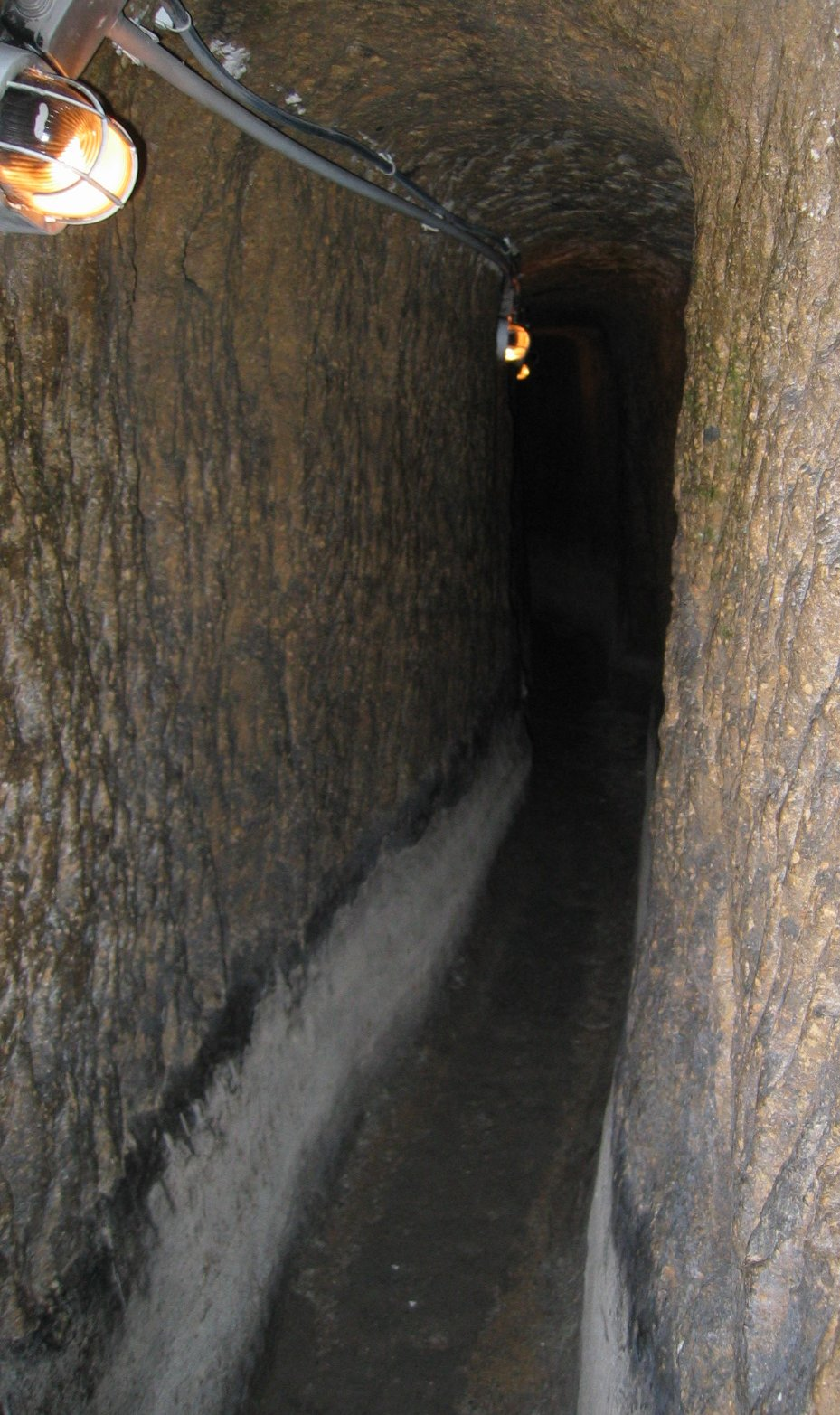
A water channel, now traveled by tourists. White deposits low on the walls show the typical previous water level.

Over the centuries a massive honeycomb of caverns and passageways has been created beneath Naples and its environs. In World War II, many of the quarry shafts were enlarged and spiraling stairways were added, opening up the caverns for use as air raid shelters.

The resulting cavities beneath the city can now be divided up into several major categories:

- Aqueducts and sewer tunnels;
- Rainwater cisterns, reservoirs and aqueduct diversionary channels;
- Caverns left from quarrying of tuff;
- The remains of Nero's "lost" theatre;
- Greco-Roman businesses, such as the remains of an ancient forum that was preserved in a mud slide;
- Other voids from removal of sand and other types of materials;
- Interconnecting tunnels and passageways among caverns;
- Places of worship, including catacombs and pre-Christian hypogea (cult burial chambers);
- Major ancient and modern roadway tunnels, and rail and subway tunnels.

Today, tours of the elaborate underground beneath Naples are available and there is even a museum of the underground located beneath Piazza Cavour in a huge quarry cavity with connecting tunnels and aqueduct passageways. It contains elaborate replicas of Greek hypogea and many ancient artifacts discovered during more than half a century of exploration.

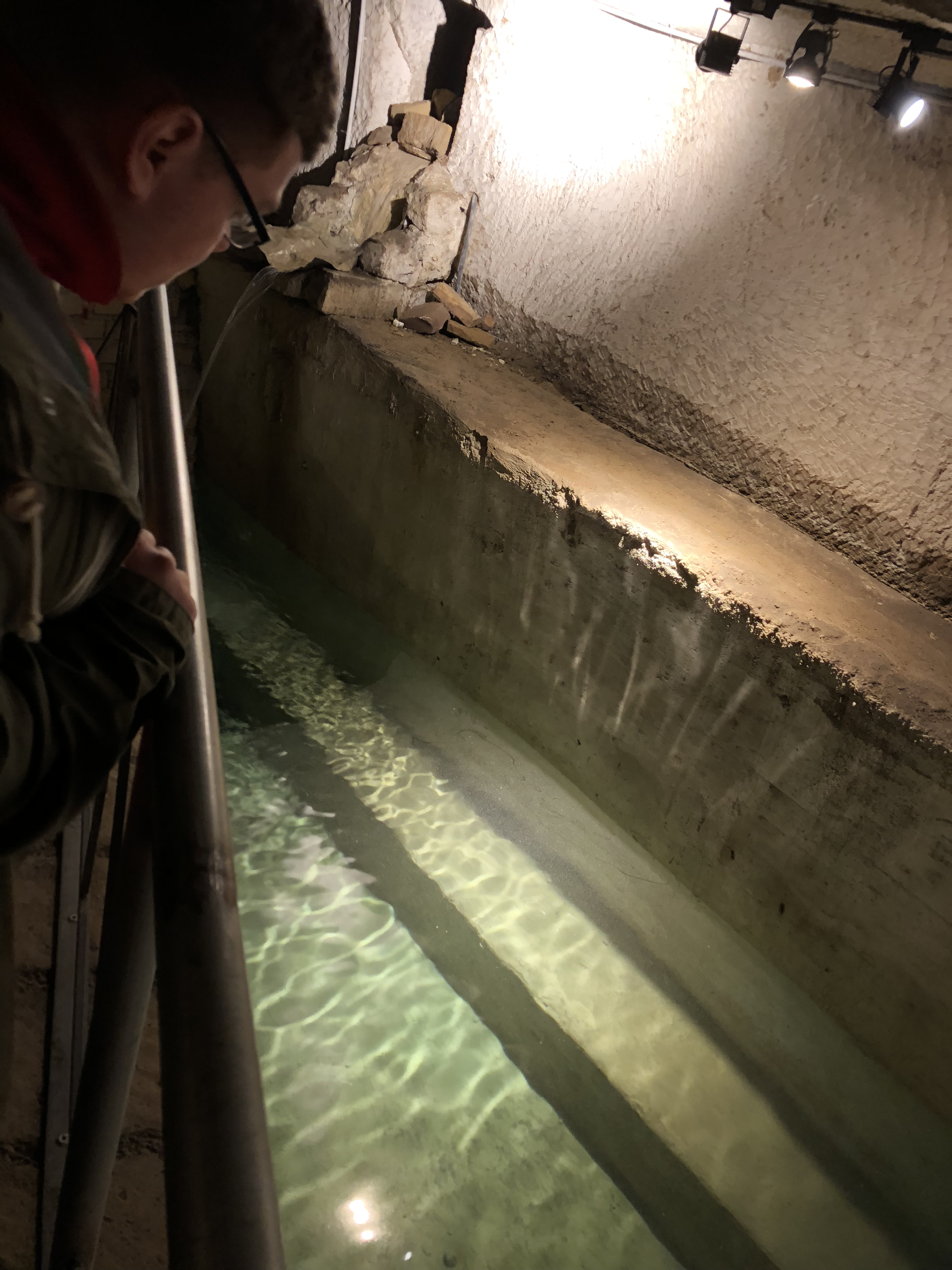
Underground water duct

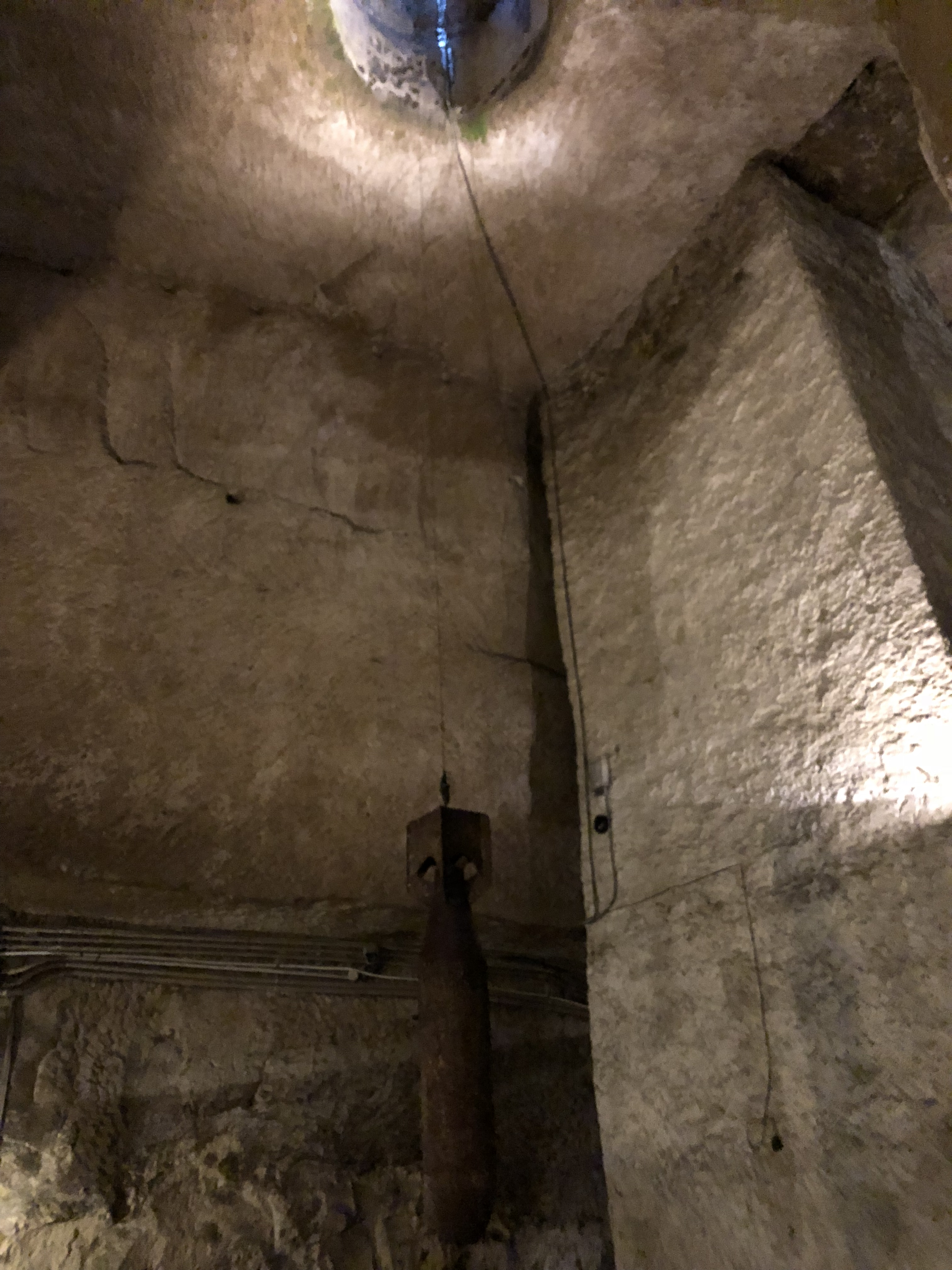
Underground well hole

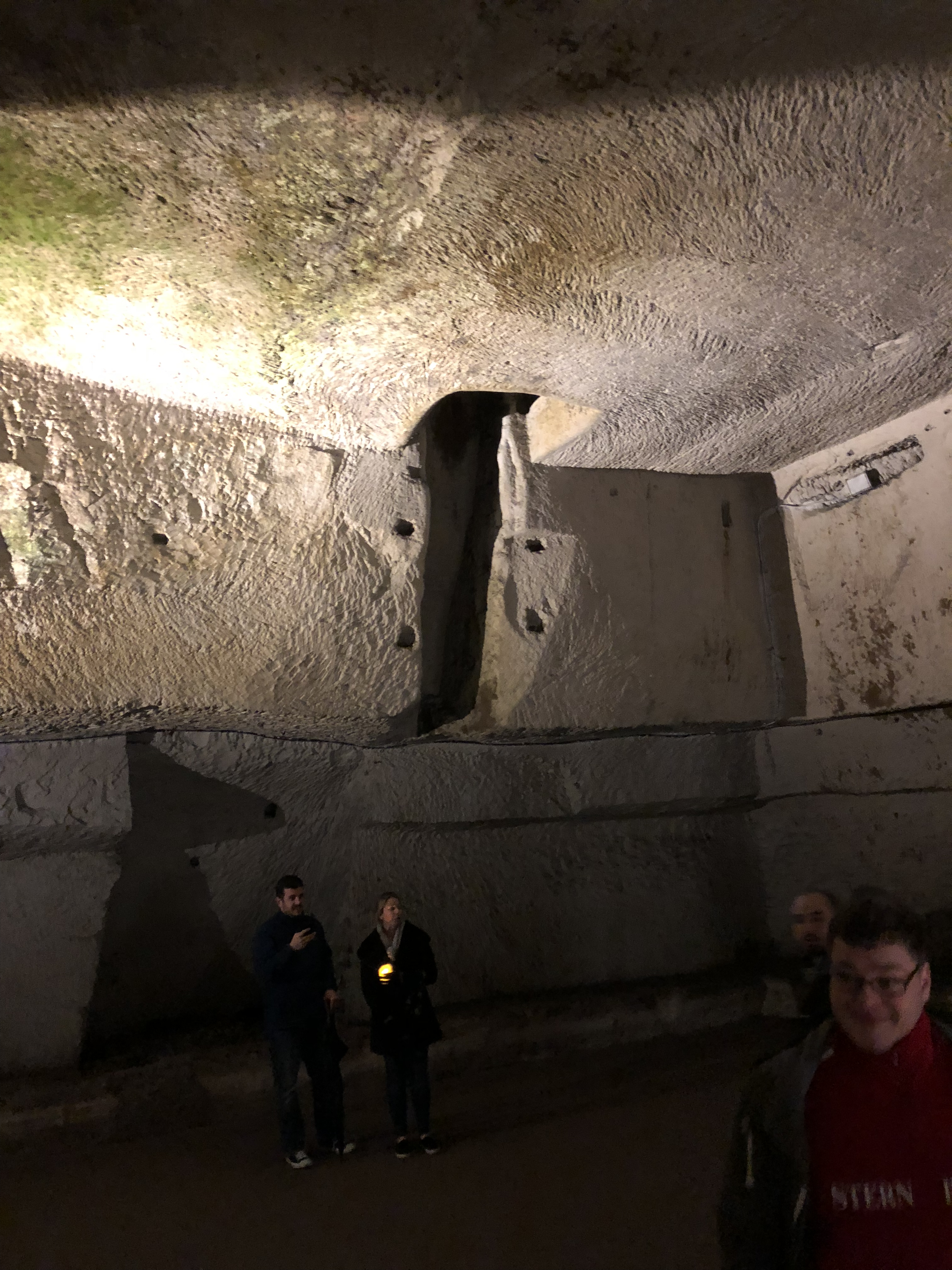
Naples underground

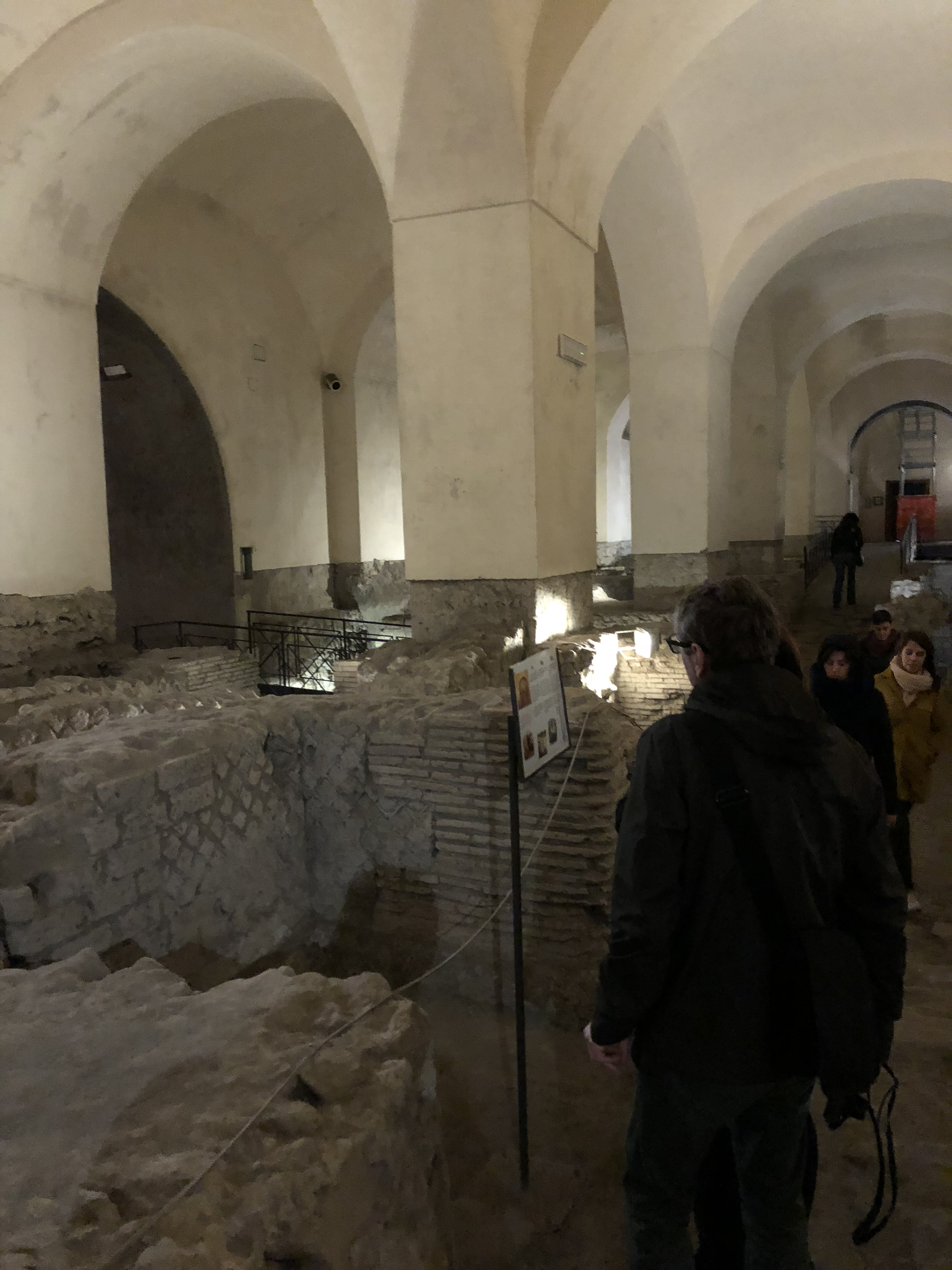
Naples underground passage
