= Marechiaro =

Human settlement in Naples, Campania, Italy

Coordinates: 40.794945°N 14.191900°E

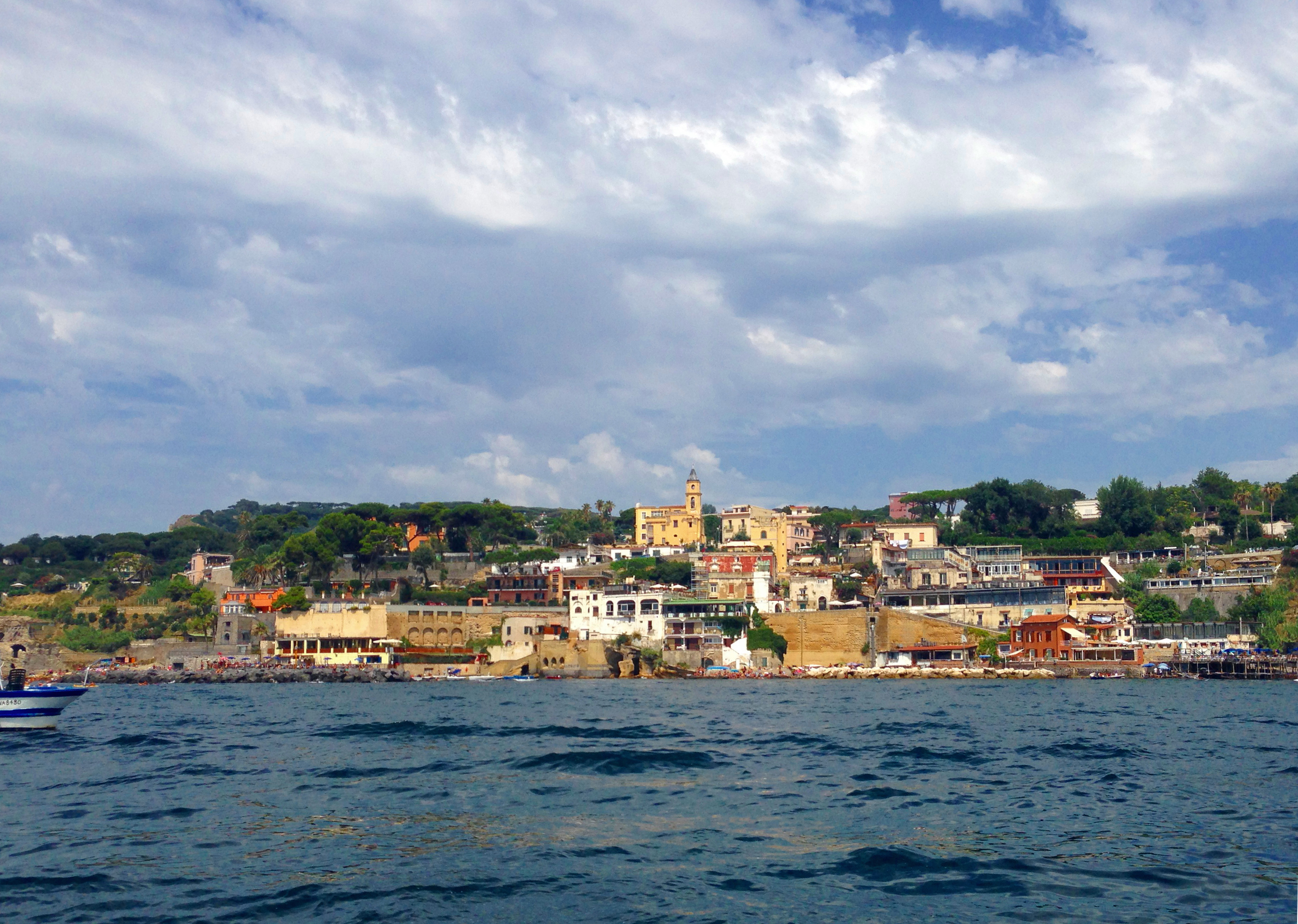
Village of Marechiaro seen from the sea

Marechiaro is a small village located in the Posillipo quarter in Naples.

== Historical background ==
In ancient times the village, developed around via Marechiaro, took its name from the church of Santa Maria del Faro. The name Marechiaro does not come, as is commonly thought, from the transparency of the waters of the sea of Posillipo, but from their quietness. Already in some documents of the Kingdom of Sicily is mentioned mare planum translated into Neapolitan mare chianu from which today's Marechiaro.

It was in the 1960s one of the symbols of the dolce vita in Italy, becoming famous for its Hollywood frequentations, for its typical restaurants overlooking the splendid panorama of the gulf and for the characteristic "Scoglione". From Marechiaro you can also admire the panoramic view of the entire city of Naples, of the Vesuvius, up to the Sorrento Peninsula and the island of Capri that appears exactly in front of the typical little beach of the village.

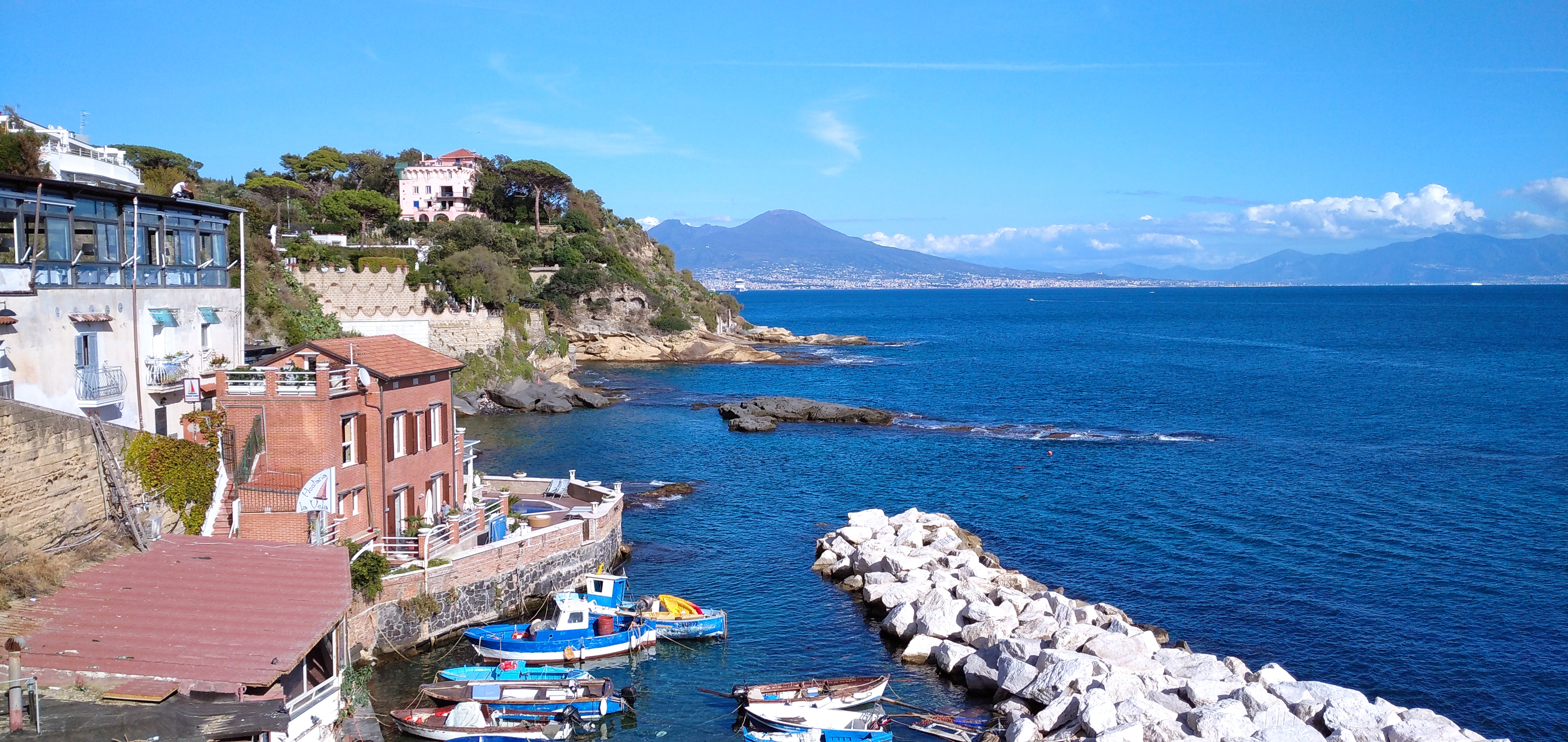
View from the stairs of Marechiaro, with the famous "Scuglione 'e Marechiare" (Scoglione di Marechiaro)

== The Fenestella ==
The detail that has contributed the most to the mythification of this little village is the so-called Fenestella (in Italian finestrella). The legend tells that the Neapolitan poet and writer Salvatore Di Giacomo, seeing a small window on whose sill there was a carnation, had the inspiration for one of the most famous Neapolitan songs: Marechiare. Today the window still exists, and there is always a fresh carnation on the windowsill, as well as a celebratory plaque in white marble engraved with some notes of the score of the song and the names of the authors.

The Archivio della Canzone Napoletana (Archive of Neapolitan Songs) bears witness to the existence of almost two hundred classic songs dedicated to this small area of Posillipo, or that only mention it, and a large number of poems.

== Picture gallery ==
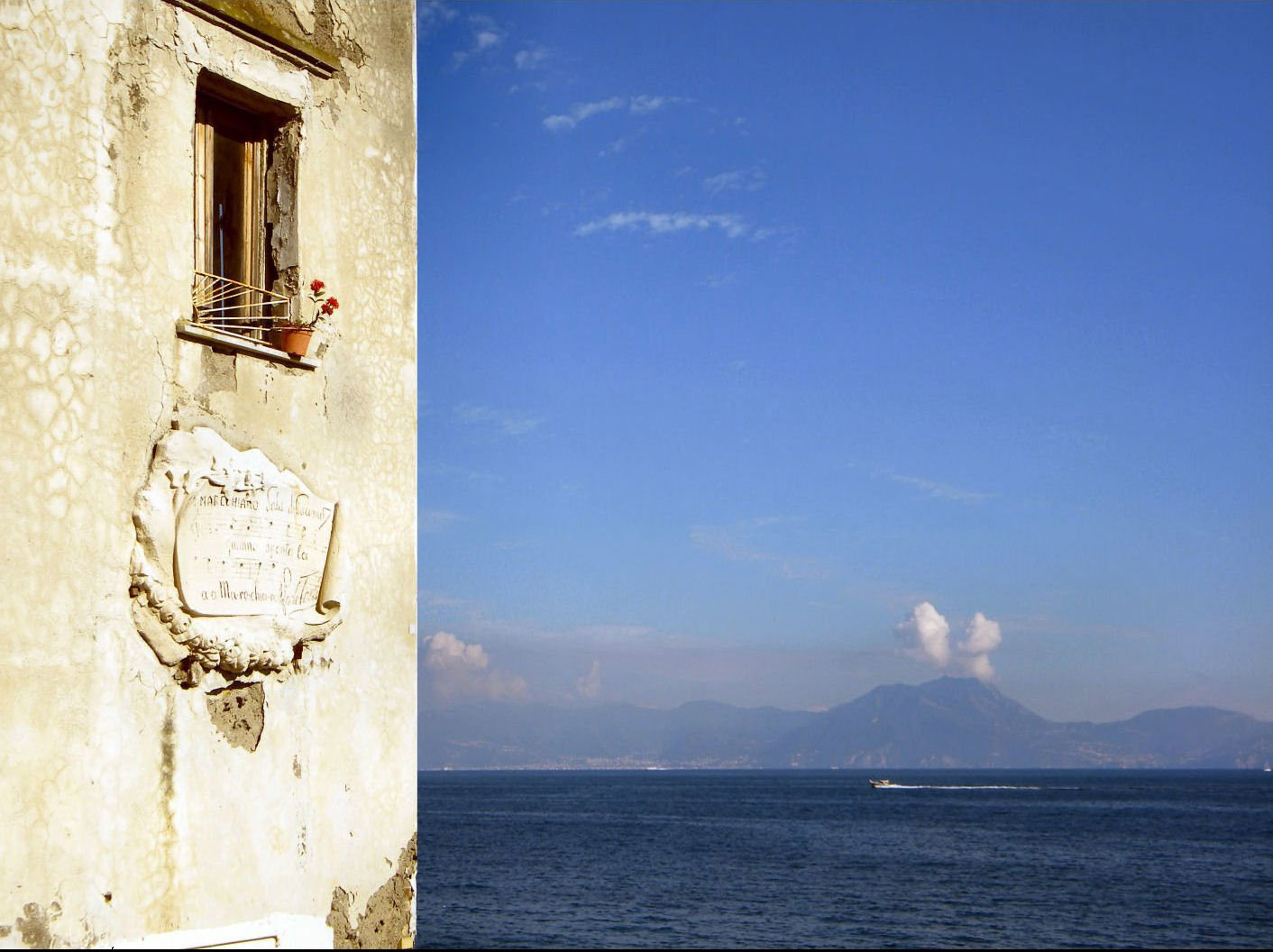

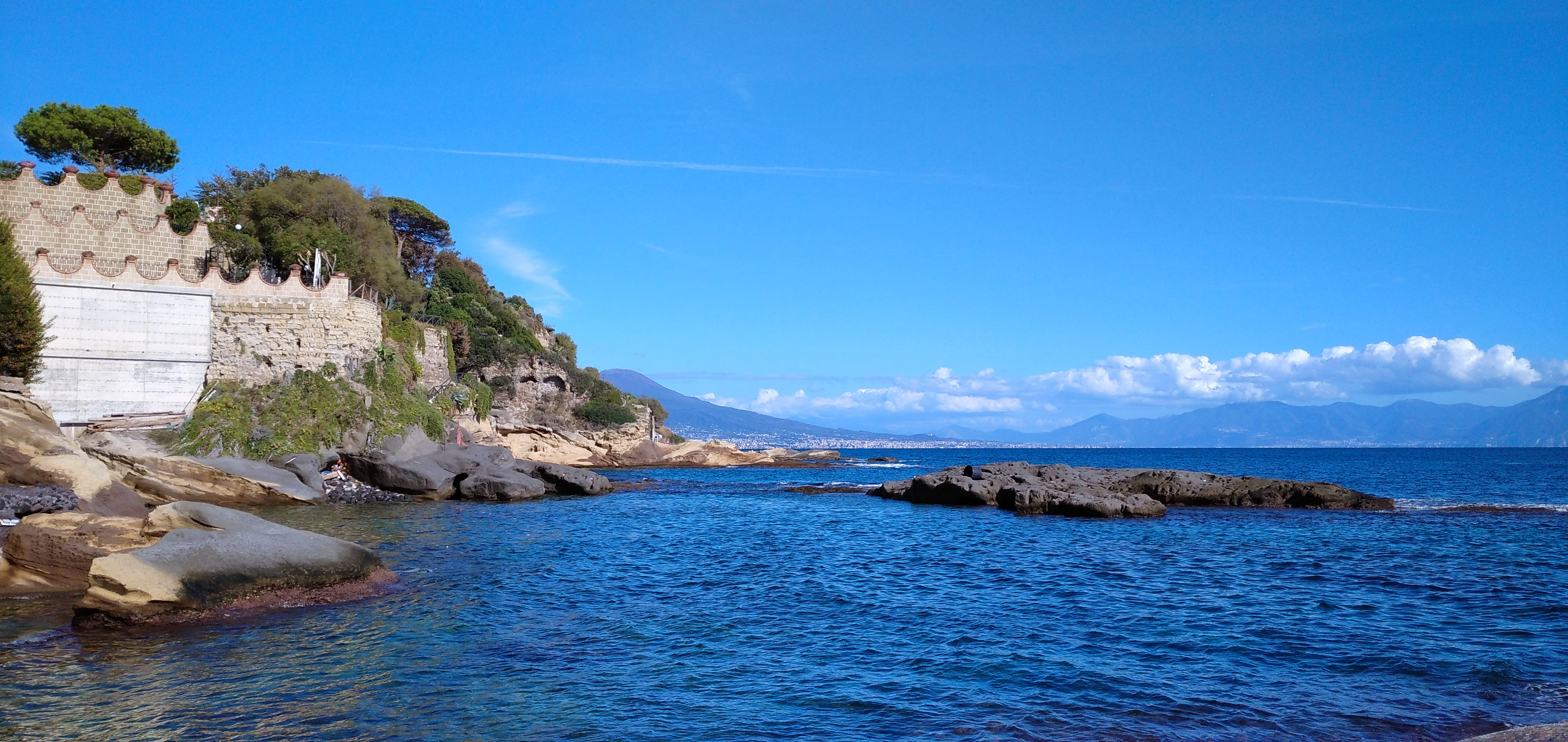

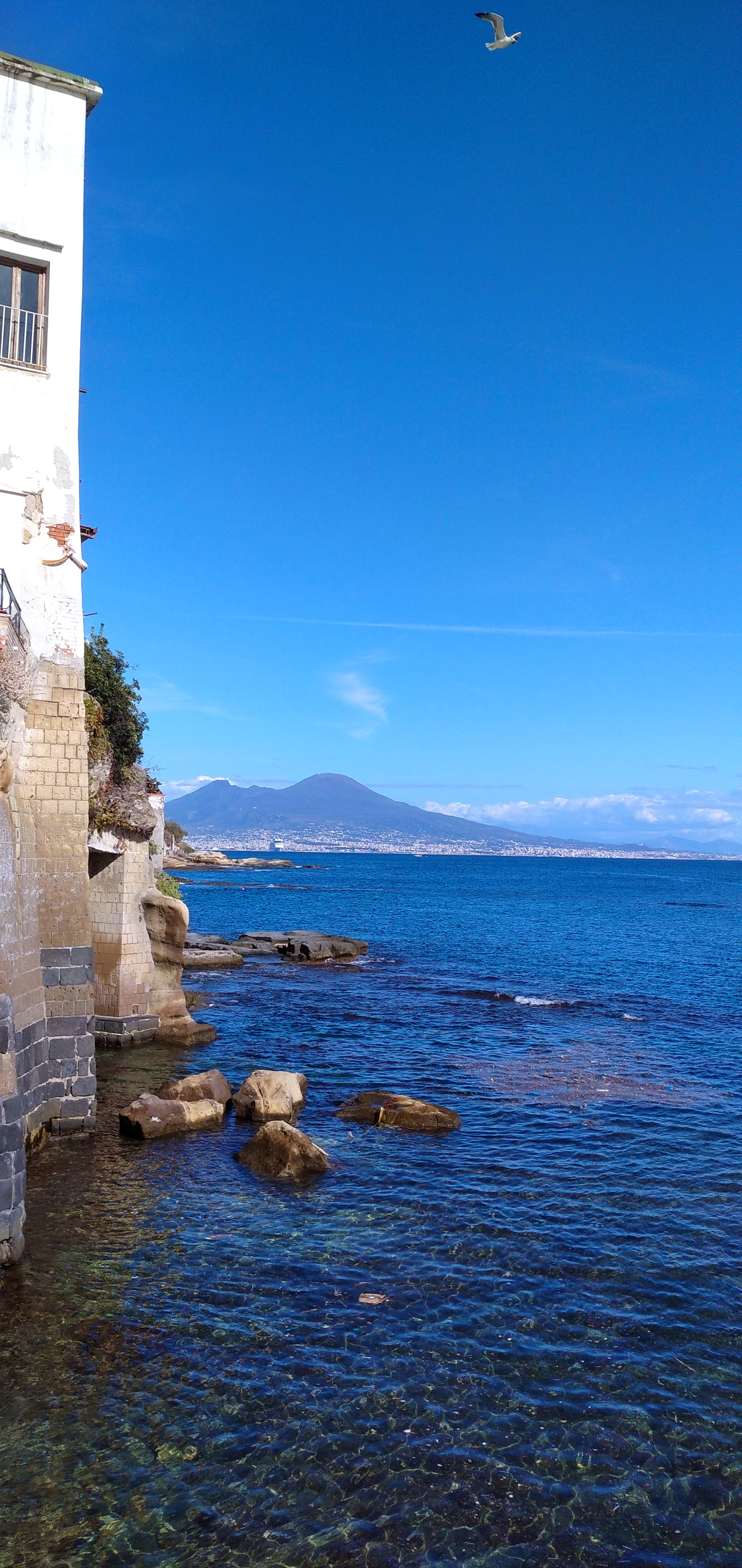

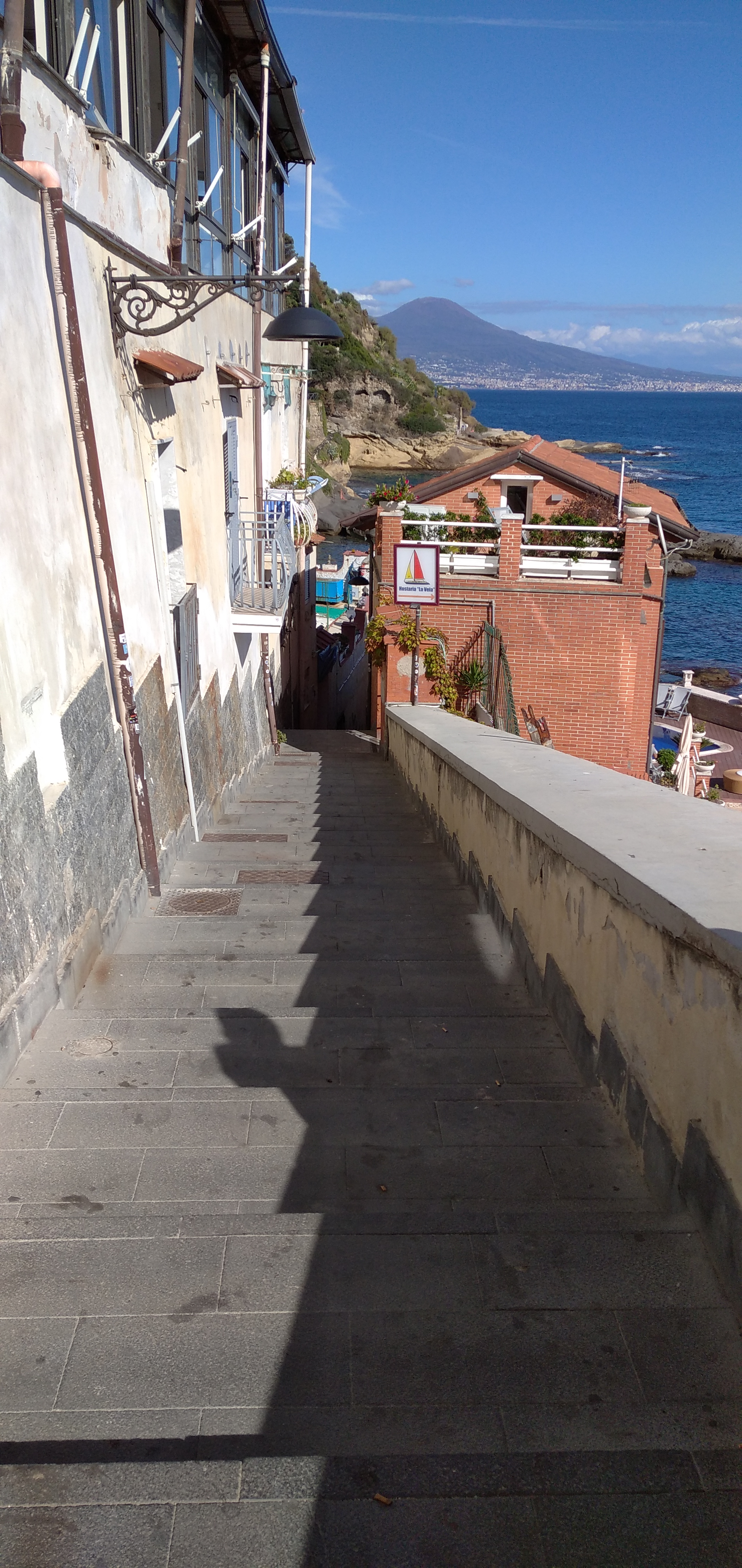

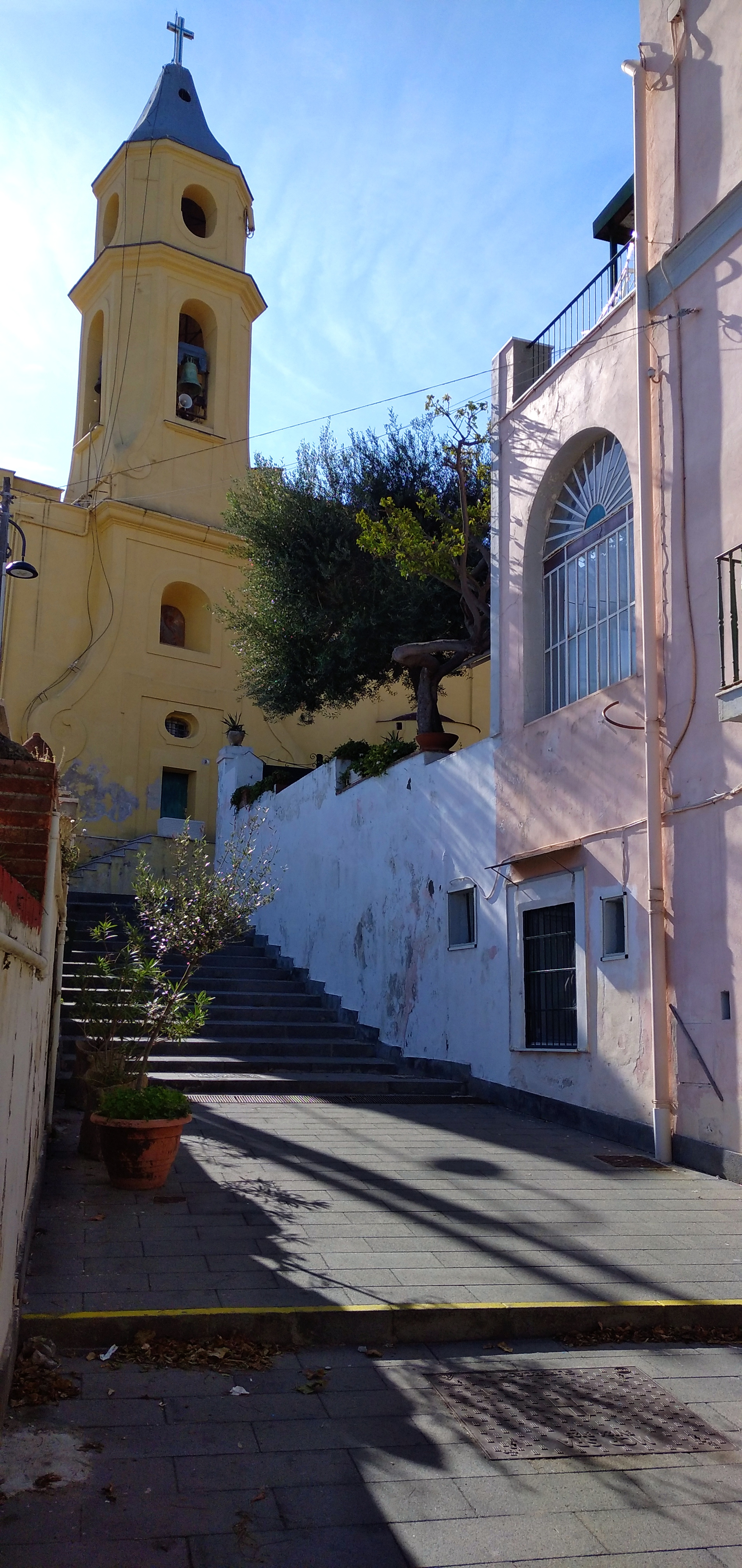
