= Soccavo =

Coordinates: 40°50′51″N 14°11′28″E

- Quarter of Naples
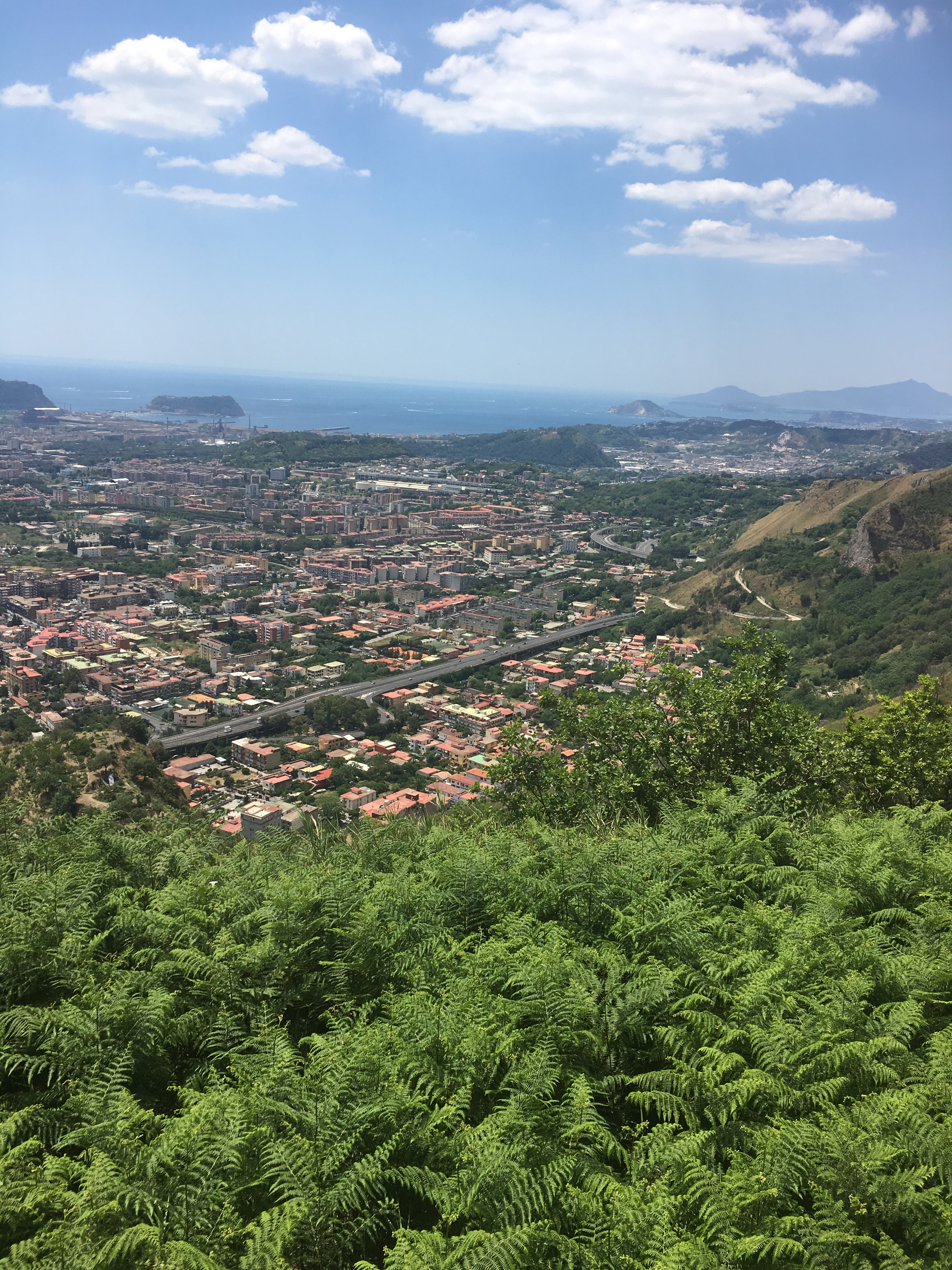
- Urban sprawl in Soccavo, view from Camaldoli hill

- Location of Soccavo within Naples
- Country: Italy
- Region: Campania
- City: Naples
- Municipalità: 9th

Area
  - Total: 5.11 km^{2} (1.97 sq mi)

Population
  - Total: 45,314
  - Density: 8,870/km^{2} (23,000/sq mi)
- Demonym: soccavesi
- Postal code: 80126

Soccavo is a western quarter of Naples, with a population of about 45,000.

== Geography ==
Soccavo (Italian: "beneath the quarry") is bounded on one side by the area of Fuorigrotta and on the other by the Camaldoli hill. At the base of the hill is an historic quarry, which gives its name to the area.

== History ==
The area appears to have been colonised by Greeks in the 4th or 5th century BC. It stayed under Greek control until the Roman conquest of 326 BC, upon which it came under the religious influence of Puteoli (now Pozzuoli); to this day Soccavo is part of the diocese of Pozzuoli and not Naples. It began to expand during the 1920s, when it was included within the administrative limits of Naples and started to develop as a residential neighborhood.

== Famous residents ==
Fabio Cannavaro, captain of the 2006 World Cup-winning Italian football team, was born in the district, along with his younger brother Paolo Cannavaro. Serena Autieri, italian actress and show-girl.
