= Nisida =

Volcanic islet of the Flegrean Islands archipelago in southern Italy

Coordinates: 40°47′43″N 14°09′48″E

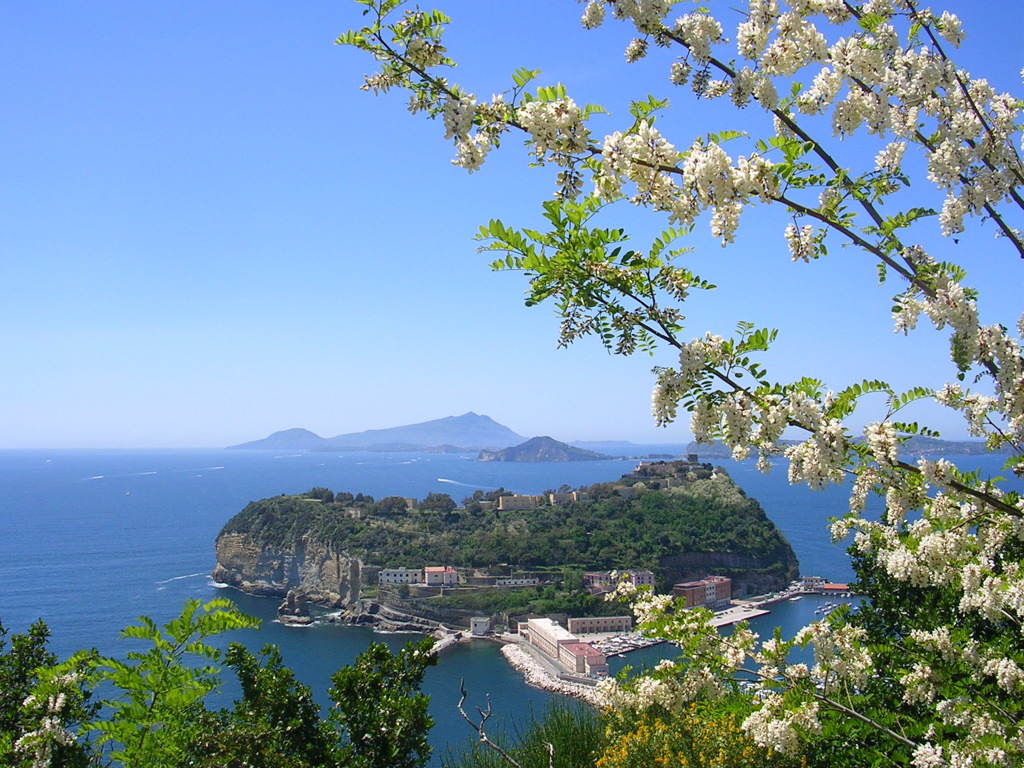
Isle of Nisida in the Gulf of Naples.

Nisida is a volcanic islet of the Flegrean Islands archipelago, in southern Italy. It lies at a very short distance from Cape Posillipo, southwest of Naples; it is connected to the mainland by a camera-enforced 1km-long pedestrian zone. The islet is almost circular, with a flooded crater forming the bay of Porto Paone on the southwest coast. It has a diameter of about 0.5 kilometres (0.3 miles) and a highest altitude of 105 metres (344 feet).

The name of the island comes from the Greek for "islet" (small island), νησίς, for which the accusative was nesida.

== Overview ==
In ancient times Lucius Licinius Lucullus built a villa on Nisida, and also Marcus Iunius Brutus had a holiday villa there. Cicero's letters record him visiting Brutus there, and it was there that Brutus's wife Porcia, the daughter of Cato Uticensis, committed suicide. He also may have agreed with Cassius on the assassination of Julius Caesar there. The claim is made that some of the archaeological remains on Nisida are, indeed, those of the villa of Brutus. There may have been a monastery there in the 7th century (see below). In the 16th century a castle was built, which was subsequently a fief of the Macedonio family.

In the 19th century, Nisida was the site of an infamous Bourbon prison that gained notoriety when - after a visit to the prison in 1851 - William Ewart Gladstone wrote his Two Letters to the Earl of Aberdeen on the State Prosecutions of the Neapolitan Government, exposing the harsh conditions. In these letters, Gladstone coined the now famous description of the Kingdom of Two Sicilies as "the negation of God erected into a system of Government." Indignation throughout Europe was partially responsible for the at least partial improvement of the conditions in the prison.

During the Second World War, the island was occupied by British Army and became "55 Military Prison". At least one execution of a criminal took place there during this time: 1474762 Gunner G.T. Huckell of the Royal Artillery was executed by firing squad on Nisida at 7.31 am on 23 May 1944. He was 26 years old and had been convicted of murdering and robbing an Italian civilian named Rudolfo Mastrominico. Huckell was subsequently buried in Plot II, Row E, Grave 3 at Naples War Cemetery. The British military also executed Italian general Nicola Bellomo for the murder of a British prisoner of war.

From 1946 through 1961 the island was home to the Accademia Aeronautica, the Italian Air Force Academy, which has since moved to a hilltop campus on the mainland.

NATO's Allied Naval Forces Southern Europe moved from Malta to Nisida Island in 1971.

Nisida is divided now between a naval headquarters belonging to the Italian Navy and a juvenile detention facility.

== A monastery at Nisida ==
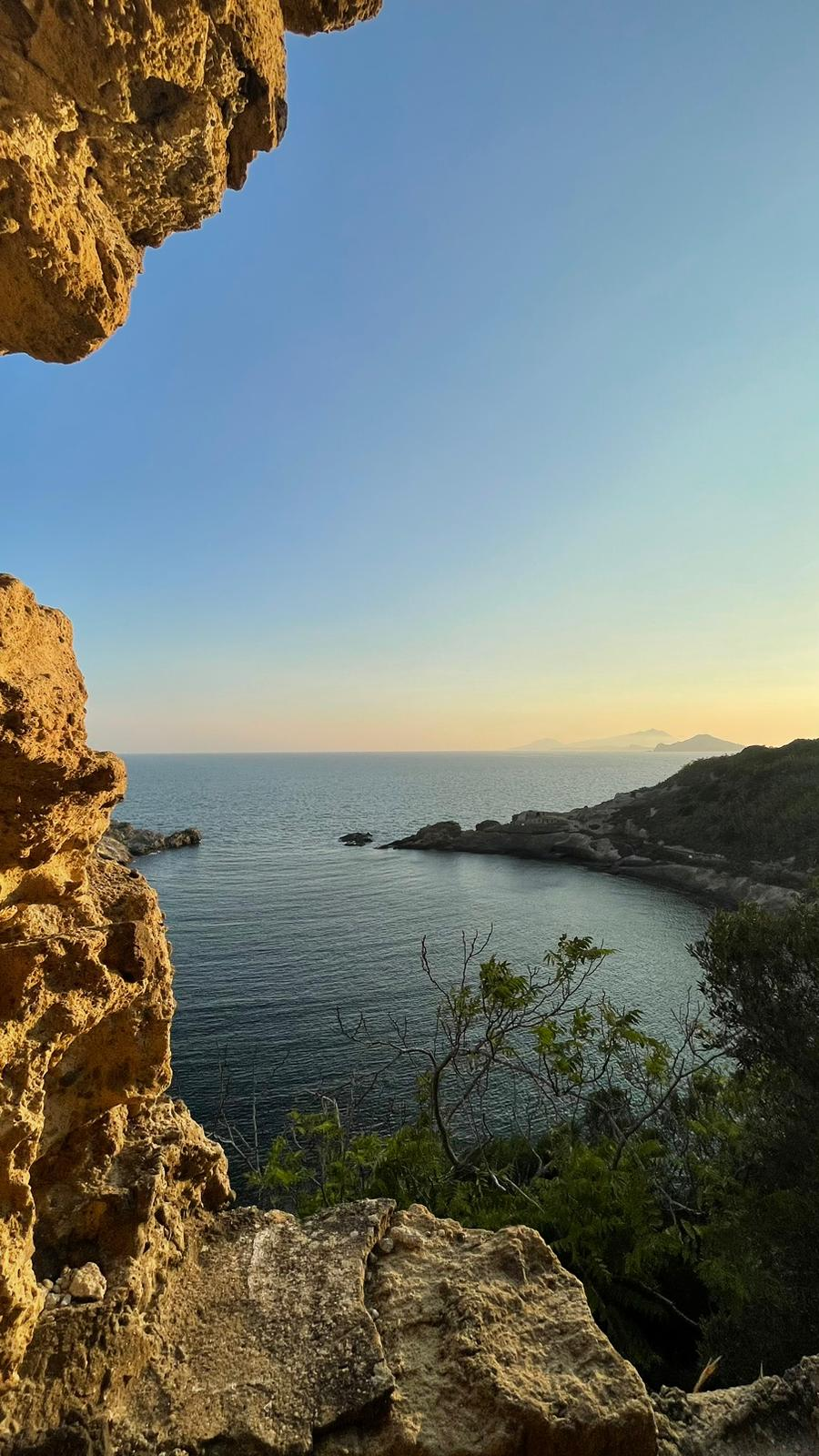
Gulf of Nisida

The surprisingly extensive connections between the island and Britain may have begun in the 7th century with Hadrian or Adrian of Canterbury, abbot of Christchurch, Dorset. Bede records that he was a Greek-speaking Berber from North Africa, who was abbot of a monastery near Naples (non longe a Neapoli). The name of the monastery varies with different textual traditions between monasterium Niridanum and Hiridanum. Neither is identifiable as a place near Naples, which has led many scholars to think that "Nisidanum", or "of Nisida" was meant. There are no other records of a monastery there, although there were many around the Bay of Naples.

Hadrian was twice offered the position of Archbishop of Canterbury by Pope Vitalian, but instead suggested Theodore of Tarsus, who then insisted that Hadrian accompany him. It is thought that a hypothetical "Neapolitan Gospelbook" which then ended up at Wearmouth-Jarrow is the source of some Neapolitan elements found in Northumbrian gospel manuscripts including the Lindisfarne Gospels, which records feasts which were celebrated only in Naples: the birth of Saint Januarius and the Dedication of the Basilica of Stephen.

== See also ==
- List of islands of Italy
