= Fuorigrotta =

Suburb of Naples, Italy

Coordinates: 40°49′30″N 14°11′43″E

- Quarter
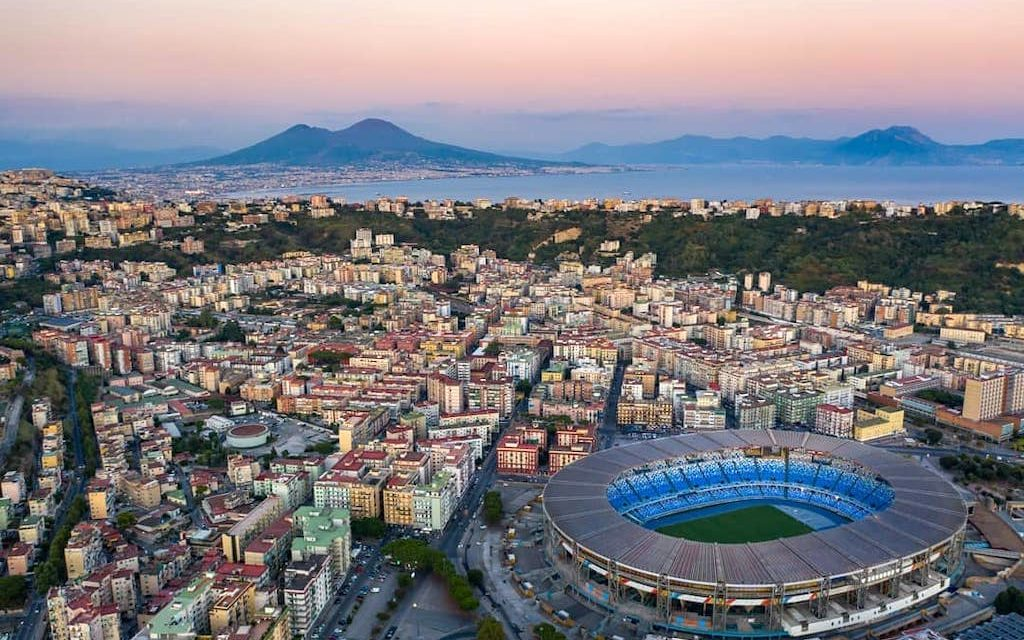

- Fuorigrotta within the municipality of Naples
- Country: Italy
- Region: Campania
- Metropolitan city: Naples
- City: Naples
- Municipalità: 10th

Government
  - President: Carmine Sangiovanni (PD)

Area
  - Total: 6.2 km^{2} (2.4 sq mi)

Population
  - Total: 71,808
  - Density: 12,000/km^{2} (30,000/sq mi)
- Demonym: fuorigrottesi
- Postal code: 80125

Fuorigrotta (Neapolitan: Forerotta; lit. 'Outside the grotto') is a western quarter of Naples, southern Italy. Covering an area of 6,2 km^{2}, it is the most populated suburb of the city (population: 76.521).

== Geography ==
It lies beyond the Posillipo hill and has been joined to the main body of Naples by two traffic tunnels through that hill since the early 20th century.

It is the site of the Stadio Diego Armando Maradona, home to the Serie A team S.S.C. Napoli and the PalaBarbuto, home of the Lega Basket Serie A team Napoli Basket. It is also the site of the new Monte Sant'Angelo campus of the University of Naples.

== Etymology and history ==
The suburb owes its name, meaning "outside the grotto", to its position: since Roman times, one or more tunnels have connected it with the district of Mergellina. The oldest tunnel is a Roman one, the Crypta Neapolitana, connecting Fuorigrotta with Piedigrotta. In Roman times, it connected Naples to the road that led to Pozzuoli and to area of the Phlegrean Fields.

Fuorigrotta had been a rural district until the Fascist era, when the urban asset of the area was radically changed beginning in 1936, first by building Viale Augusto and by locating in the area the Mostra d'Oltremare (one of the most important Italian fair grounds), and then by the construction of the Santa Maria Immacolata church. During this period, many streets changed their names into Roman-inspired ones: Viale Augusto, Via Giulio Cesare, Via Caio Duilio etc.

After World War II, Fuorigrotta underwent intense urban expansion and became the most densely populated area of the city.

== See also ==
- Claudia Aster inscription
