= Rinaldi clan =

- Founded: 1989
- Founding location: Rione Villa, San Giovanni a Teduccio
- Years active: 1989–present
- Territory: San Giovanni a Teduccio; Infiltration in Somma Vesuviana
- Leaders: Ciro Rinaldi (My way)
- Criminal activities: Murder, extortion, drug trafficking, racketeering, counterfeit
- Allies: Secondigliano Alliance; Contini clan Giuliano clan De Luca Bossa clan Aprea-Cuccaro clan
- Rivals: Mazzarella clan

The Rinaldi clan is a Camorra clan operating in the area of San Giovanni a Teduccio, in the eastern area of the city of Naples. Since 2019 the clan has formed an alliance with the Ponticelli's De Luca Bossa clan, and Barra's Aprea-Cuccaro clan, called by the media Rinaldi-De Luca Bossa-Aprea, which has emerged as the most powerful Camorra group in the eastern region of Naples.

== History ==
The Rinaldi clan was founded in 1989 from the split of the Mazzarella clan. The clan from the beginning was marked by great blood ties between its leaders, their leadership was conventional, strong and imposing. The first head of the clan was Antonio Rinaldi, known as 'O Giallo, boss with great criminal capabilities and killed in 1989 by order of Gennaro Mazzarella. After the death of 'O Giallo, his brother Vincenzo took the reins of the clan. Leader of considerable criminal charisma, Vincenzo was killed in 1996, after an escalation of violence between the Rinaldi and Mazzarella clans. And the other brother, Gennaro, called 'O lione, replaced him at the head of the organization. Between the years 1996 and 2009, the clan was heavily active in the international counterfeiting market. To coordinate the group's affairs, the top members of the organization moved abroad. This absence of the leaders on the territory has made the group extremely vulnerable to the constant attempts of other clans, in the eastern area of Naples, to expand their territories.

The organization only strongly recovered in the territory of San Giovanni a Teduccio, when Ciro Rinaldi, called My way, took control of the clan in the 2010s. In fact, the clan reached its peak in 2017 and 2018, having created small factions in other parts of the city, one led by Luigi Esposito called "o’ sciamarro", and another controlled by Luisa De Stefano, called "La pazzignana" in the Rione De Gasperi, Ponticelli. Ciro Rinaldi, according to the investigators, has a cynical strategist's mind and the typical liveliness of the ruthless criminal.

== Recent years ==
Ciro Rinaldi

According to the pentito Vincenzo Amirante, the Rinaldi clan made a pact with the leaders of the so-called Paranza dei bambini, even before it was headed by the Giuliano's heirs, the main objective of the pact was to eliminate the Mazzarella clan and take the area of the Maddalena, in the center of Naples.

The clan is allied with the powerful Secondigliano Alliance, decisive in making the Rinaldi one of the most powerful clans in the Camorra. After the strong pact with the Secondigliano Alliance leaders, they had quickly gained a monopoly on the sale of marijuana in the eastern outskirts of the city.

The clan has made a strong alliance with the De Luca Bossa clan and the Aprea-Cuccaro clan, which since the beginning of 2019 has been a hegemon in much of the eastern area of the city of Naples.

On 16 February 2019, Ciro Rinaldi, the leader of the organization, was arrested in San Pietro a Patierno. On 18 September 2019, Rinaldi was sentenced to life imprisonment for the double murder of Ciro Colonna, hit by mistake, and for Raffaele Cepparulo, boss of the "barbudos" faction of the Rione Sanità.

In December 2019 the first statements by the newly pentito Tommaso Schisa on the dynamics of the Rinaldi clan were reported in the media, shedding light on the murder of Vincenzo De Bernardo. According to Schisa, De Bernardo was killed for violating the pact on the drugs business with the leaders of the Piezzo group, but above all, with the boss Ciro Rinaldi.

In February 2020 four members affiliated to the clan were arrested, among which are also Rita and Francesco Rinaldi, sons of the late boss 'O Giallo, as well nephews of Ciro Rinaldi. They are accused of usury, extortion and attempted extortion with the aggravating circumstance of the mafia method.

== Structure ==
- Ciro Rinaldi, called My way. — Head of the clan. Arrested in February 2019 and sentenced to life in prison.
- Sergio Grassia, called Sergiolino. — Rinaldi's right-hand man. Arrested in June 2019.
- Raffaele Oliviero, called o pop. — Capoparanza. Arrested in June 2019.
- Ciro Grassia – Capoparanza. Arrested in May 2019.
- Raffaele Maddaluno, called nzalatella. — Capoparanza. Surrendered to law enforcement in February 2019.

== See also ==
- Camorra
- List of Camorra clans
- San Giovanni a Teduccio
- De Luca Bossa clan
- Secondigliano Alliance
