= Aprea-Cuccaro clan =

Camorra clan operating in Barra, Naples

- Founded: Early 1990s
- Founded by: Giovanni Aprea; Angelo Cuccaro
- Founding location: Barra, Naples
- Years active: 1990s-present
- Territory: Barra, Ponticelli and Somma Vesuviana
- Criminal activities: Murder, extortion, drug trafficking, racketeering, money laundering
- Allies: De Luca Bossa clan Secondigliano Alliance; Rinaldi clan
- Rivals: Mazzarella clan Sarno clan (defunct); Lago clan (defunct); Formicola clan

The Aprea-Cuccaro clan is a Camorra clan operating in the area of Barra, in the city of Naples.

== History ==
Giovanni Aprea, known as 'e curtiello, a leading figure of the clan, began the criminal career working for Ciro Sarno, then a powerful boss of the Sarno clan from Ponticelli. Aprea was arrested for the first time on April 27, 1990, in a building in Barra, where he was hiding with his three bodyguards, all fugitives for Camorra association and racketeering. Investigations in the early 1990s already indicated him as the head of the local underworld. After the arrest of Giovanni Aprea, his brother Vincenzo took the reins of the clan. After Vincenzo's arrest, the reins of the clan passed into the hands of the three Aprea sisters: Lena, Patrizia and Giuseppina.

Angelo Cuccaro, called Angiulillo o' fratone, certainly the most important figure of the Cuccaros within the Aprea-Cuccaro clan, began his criminal career as a right hand man of the boss Giovanni Aprea, in fact the Cuccaro, according to investigators, represented a sort of criminal subgroup with its own, limited, autonomy in the management of the organization in Barra. Angelo Cuccaro has been in the command of the clan together with his brothers Michele and Luigi.

According to investigators, since the 1990s, the Aprea-Cuccaro clan has entered into an agreement with the Secondigliano Alliance. The goal was to resist the pressure exerted by the Mazzarella clan and the Sarno clan. The clan, in fact, is the first to offer support to the De Luca Bossa clan against the Sarnos, in the times of the violent feud between the two organizations. In the late 1990s, the clan was also involved in the investigation conducted by the prosecutors Antimafia, Luigi Bobbio and Giovanni Corona which reconstructs the Camorra feuds in the eastern area.

In the 2000s, Angelo Cuccaro became famous for having been immortalized in a video published by the weekly L'espresso which shows him aboard of a Rolls-Royce during the famous "Gigli" festival, in Barra. The video has attracted the attention of the international media, for the ostentatious way in which Cuccaro attended the party.

== Political connections ==
In the 1990s, the then president of the Barra district council was arrested and reported by investigators as the clan's "trusted man" within the local parliament. The investigations opened a new phase when it revealed about the bribes imposed by the Aprea-Cuccaro clan, and pocketed by the politician, to the entrepreneurs engaged in the building renovation works in Barra, which has costed to the politician a new arrest warrant by extortion and camorra association in 1997.

== Feuds ==
- Aprea-Cuccaro clan and Formicola clan: According to investigators, one of the bloodiest feuds in the eastern area of the city of Naples. Gaetano Formicola, a prominent member of the Formicola clan, was killed on June 27, 1993. In 1996 Salvatore Cuccaro, one of Angelo Cuccaro's brothers, was killed.
- Aprea-Cuccaro clan and Celeste-Guarino clan: A violent feud fought in the area of Barra, between the Aprea-Cuccaro clan and what according to investigators, was the splitting faction of the Celeste-Guarino in the years 2005 and 2006. The clan emerged victorious from the feud.

== Arrests and seizures ==
In 2010, the sisters Patrizia, Lena and Giuseppina Aprea were arrested together with 13 alleged affiliates of the Aprea-Cuccaro clan.

In 2011, €20 million were seized from the clan by the Italian Police. Among the seized assets were two apartments, a villa, two companies, shares in three companies and seven luxury cars.

On March 14, 2014, Angelo Cuccaro, known as Angiulillo o' fratone, was arrested in Ardea. Cuccaro was sentenced to life imprisonment for the murder of Luigia Esposito in 1996.

In May 2014, the Neapolitan Anti-Mafia Directorate seized movable and immovable property worth €5 million that belonged to the clan. Among the seized assets was also a mega villa in the province of Naples.

On June 21, 2015, Luigi Cuccaro was arrested in the Barra district, the clan stronghold.

On October 6, 2015, Michele Cuccaro, Angelo's brother, was arrested in Cisterna di Latina. Angelo was included in the list of the 100 most dangerous fugitives. In 2017 Cuccaro was sentenced to life imprisonment, considered the responsible for the murder of the 14 year old Giovanni Gargiulo, happened on September 14, 1998. Gargiulo was murdered because he was the brother of Costantino Gargiulo, affiliated with the Formicola clan.

On March 17, 2020, the Italian police arrested five members of the clan suspected, in various capacities, of extortion and attempted extortion. According to investigations, the building contractors of the area, victims of extortion by the arrested members of the clan, were summoned to the 'villa' of the boss Antonio Acanfora, considered the current regent of the Apreas, also arrested in the operation. This new wave of extortions made by the clan are considered part of the new criminal alliance between the Aprea clan, the De Luca Bossa clan and the Rinaldi clan.

On May 29, 2020, Ciro Imperatrice, known as Brutolino, was arrested in an apartment in Barra, the police surprised him hidden inside a closet of the bedroom. Imperatrice is allegedly the regent of the Andolfi faction, particularly linked to the Cuccaros.

== Current status ==
According to the latest DIA reports, the Aprea-Cuccaro clan is allied with the Rinaldi clan from San Giovanni a Teduccio, and with the De Luca Bossa clan from Ponticelli, with the intention of undermining the Mazzarella clan.

Yet, according to the DIA, the Aprea-Cuccaro together with the Rinaldi clan are trying to expand to Somma Vesuviana. And through contacts with the local criminals, would have taken control of illicit affairs in the area, supporting the D'Atri faction, a small criminal group already inserted in the underworld of Somma Vesuviana.

In 2020, an emerging group formed by very young affiliates declared war on the Aprea-Cuccaro clan. With the intention of taking the place of the old clan, on May 6 of the same year the new group ambushed Luigi Ferrante, an important affiliate of the clan. Ferrante was shot but recovered in the Ospedale del Mare, in Ponticelli. According to the police, this was a clear sign that a new group would be wanting to end the hegemony created by the Rinaldi-De Luca Bossa-Aprea in the eastern region of Naples.

According to numerous police reports, in recent years the clan has extended its influence also on the Ponticelli area.

== See also ==
- Camorra
- De Luca Bossa clan
- Secondigliano Alliance
- Rinaldi clan
- List of Camorra clans
- Barra (Naples)
