= Erminia Giuliano =

Italian mobster (born 1955)

- Born: 31 December 1955 (age 70); Naples, Italy
- Other name: Celeste ("Sky-blue")
- Known for: Member of the Giuliano clan
- Allegiance: Giuliano clan / Camorra

Erminia Giuliano (Italian pronunciation: [erˈmiːnja dʒuˈljaːno]; born 31 December 1955) is a former member of the Giuliano clan of the Camorra, based in the district of Forcella, Naples. Her nickname was Celeste ("Sky-blue") on account of her bright, blue eyes.

== Taking over the Giuliano clan ==
She took over the Giuliano clan crime business after the arrest of her brother Luigi Giuliano in early 2000, who was the last of the five male family members to be arrested. Luigi would eventually become a pentito in September 2002 and testify against various Camorra figures, including members of his own clan. She became the boss because the only direct male heir to the family business still unimprisoned, Giuliano's nephew Pio Vittorio Giuliano, was deemed inept.

She was ranked as one of Italy's 30 most dangerous criminals, and eventually arrested on 23 December 2000, after being a fugitive for over 10 months. Her speciality within the clan was counterfeiting banknotes.

== Personality ==
She had a violent streak: if bored as a young woman, she would say: "I have to shoot someone." She allegedly stabbed a rival female gang leader in 1997, and drove a car into the shop window of another enemy in 1999. One high-profile friend was the football star Diego Maradona when he played for Napoli. The Giuliano clan’s interests included drugs and illegal betting on football matches. Carmine, one of Erminia's brothers, said later that Maradona would do anything for cocaine, even if Napoli lost the Italian championship.

== Arrest ==
Police raided her daughter's house in the Forcella quarter of Naples shortly after midnight and found her in a secret room concealed behind a kitchen cupboard and a sliding wall panel. "She was a true leader, with all the qualities usually associated with crime godfathers," according to the Naples police chief, Carlo Gualdi.

She insisted on a shower and visit from her hairdresser before she donned high heels, a fake leopard-skin coat and handcuffs, and told her daughters: "I'm counting on you now. I am relaxed. I have taught you all the true values in life."

=== Release ===
Since her release from prison, Erminia Giuliano has lived in Formia, Lazio. In 2019, the Italian State seized her assets due to a patrimonial issue regarding to a mafia-type criminal conspiracy sentence that she was convicted in the past.

== See also ==
- Camorra
- Luigi Giuliano
- Giuliano clan
