= Mazzarella clan =

Criminal organization

- Founded: 1960s
- Founded by: Ciro Mazzarella, Gennaro Mazzarella and Vincenzo Mazzarella
- Founding location: San Giovanni a Teduccio, Naples, Italy
- Years active: 1960s-present
- Territory: Several districts of Naples (San Lorenzo) in Campania. Presence also in Spain, France and Peru.
- Criminal activities: Drug trafficking, money laundering, racket, smuggling, murder, prostitution, gambling
- Allies: Russo clan Catania Mafia family Ndrangheta; South American drug cartels
- Rivals: Secondigliano Alliance; Contini clan; Licciardi clan; Mallardo clan; Rinaldi clan De Luca Bossa clan Vollaro clan Aprea-Cuccaro clan

The Mazzarella clan is a Campanian Camorra clan operating in the city of Naples. The clan is historically considered one of the most powerful groups of the Camorra.

== History ==
The clan was founded in the 1960s by the Mazzarella brothers, Ciro known as 'o Scellone, Gennaro and Vincenzo, as a branch of the Zaza clan, then headed by the historical boss Michele Zaza, who was a relative of the Mazzarella brothers. The organization started dedicating itself to the cigarette smuggling, establishing itself from the Borgo Santa Lucia to Posillipo, and from Bagnoli to Pozzuoli. The Mazzarella clan grew rapidly and became independent from the Zazas, thanks to Ciro Mazzarella, who since the 1960s demonstrated his entrepreneurial abilities, buying small ships and starting his own smuggling empire.

In the 1970s, the organization was already dubbed by the media as the kings of cigarette smuggling, however, during the eighties and nineties the organization ended up involved in many Camorra wars, in particular against the Contini clan, which led to the death of dozens of affiliates including the father of the Mazzarella brothers, Francesco, killed in an ambush in 1998, with an increase in February of the same year which led to ten deaths in nine days.

In the late 1980s the Mazzarellas formed a strong alliance with the Misso and Sarno clans, called Misso-Mazzarella-Sarno, to oppose to the rising power of the Secondigliano Alliance, headed by the Licciardi, Mallardo and Contini bosses. However, in 2008, this alliance was broken after the fall of the Sarno clan, bringing the eastern suburbs of Naples to a new and bloody war.

In 1996 Marianna, daughter of Luigi Giuliano, boss of the Giuliano clan, married Michele Mazzarella, son of Vincenzo Mazzarella, the union served to strengthen the relations between the two most important clans of Camorra in the 1990s.

The clan has a long history of rivalry with the Rinaldi clan, which caused dozens of deaths from the bloody wars between the two groups.

According to revelations made by pentitos of the clan, despite the degree of kinship among the founders of the organization, the Mazzarellas are not united as it seems, actually, each brother has an area of their own influence inside the several territories dominated by the clan. The clan is virtually fragmented into three independent groups.

=== Ciro Mazzarella ===
Born in Naples on April 2, 1940, Ciro Mazzarella aka 'o Scellone, was considered the true heir of Michele Zaza, having strong relations with the Sicilian Mafia, in particular with the Catania Mafia family. According to justice collaborators, the late boss of the Catania Mafia, Giuseppe Calderone was the godparent in the baptism of one of the Mazzarella's sons.

'O Scellone had also good relationships with other powerful bosses of the Camorra, such as Mario Fabbrocino and Alfredo Maisto. He was also seen in the company of Vincenzo Casillo of the Nuova Camorra Organizzata, in fact, Mazzarella never took a side in the war between the Nuova Famiglia and the NCO, despite the top position Michele Zaza held inside the NF.

In the early 1990s Mazzarella had amassed great wealth, in 1992 he decided to move to Switzerland, after losing a war between Camorra clans in Naples. From his logistics base in Lugano, he created an enviable economic Empire with cigarette smuggling that arrived from Montenegro. According to the parliamentary inquiry commission of 1996, Ciro Mazzarella headed a true illegal Empire: 200 billion lire in turnover, for a net profit of over 6 billion lire monthly (€4,4 million monthly, in today's exchange). In 2002 he was arrested in Spain, and after his release from prison in 2006, he returned to live in Naples.

On September 2, 2018, Ciro Mazzarella, died in his villa in the affluent neighbourhood of Posillipo, Naples at the age of 78.

== Historical leaderships ==
- Ciro Mazzarella known as 'o Scellone (Naples, April 2, 1940 - Naples, September 2, 2018)
- Gennaro Mazzarella known as 'o Schizzo (Naples, September 25, 1949)
- Vincenzo Mazzarella known as ‘o Pazzo (Naples, May 8, 1956 - Milan, November 5, 2018)
- Ciro Mazzarella (Naples, May 3, 1971)
- Roberto Mazzarella (head of Mazzarella clan at time of arrest in April 2026)

== Activities ==
Since the 20th century, the clan is known to be also active in France. In 2004 Vincenzo Mazzarella, one of the founders of the organization, was arrested in Paris. Mazzarella was reportedly dealing diamonds with African criminals in the country.

In 2009, Ciro Mazzarella, born in 1971, was arrested in Santo Domingo, Dominican Republic. In the country, he lived in a luxurious residence and held the reins of the clan especially for the management of drug trafficking.

According to the Spanish police, in Spain the clan is active in Marbella, Fuengirola, Zaragoza and Ceuta.

Operating from Barcelona, Salvatore Zazo, one of the top members of the clan, was allegedly involved in a large scheme of international cocaine trafficking from Peru to Europe, with the intention to acquire total control of the Port of Callao; one of his contacts was the drug lord Gerald Oropeza, one of the biggest traffickers in Peru. According to the DEA, Zazo would manage more than U$500 million per year in shipments of cocaine through the ports of the country to Europe.

According to the Direzione Investigativa Antimafia, the clan has alliances with Albanian mafia groups.

In recent years, the new leaders of the Russo clan, from Nola, also formed an alliance with the Mazzarellas.

According to the reports of the DIA about the Camorra in 2019, the Mazzarella clan, despite the death of two of its founders, is still one of the most powerful organizations in Campania, dominating the territory in various neighbourhoods, and having numerous groups under their influence.

=== Present day ===
In January 2025, the Mazzarella clan was once again thrust into the spotlight following a major anti-mafia investigation led by the Naples District Anti-Mafia Directorate (DDA). The inquiry, launched after a formal complaint filed in 2022 by two brothers, owners of a business and a freight company operating inside the Port of Naples, uncovered a scheme of systematic extortion carried out by affiliates of the clan. According to the victims, clan members demanded a monthly payment of €500 and an additional lump sum as "back pay" for previous years, using threats and physical violence to enforce compliance. The extortion was described as essential for the victims to continue operating their businesses in the port area. Three individuals were arrested in connection with the case, including Gennaro Mazzarella, nephew of historical boss Vincenzo Mazzarella, and Salvatore Barile,a previously convicted for Camorra-related crimes. Wiretaps revealed the clan's continued influence over extortion rackets not only within the port of Naples but also in nearby towns such as San Giorgio a Cremano and Portici. One intercepted conversation featured Gustavo Alek Noviello, a 33-year-old associate of the clan, claiming the Mazzarella group could deploy up to 300 men if necessary, a testament to the organization's enduring power and reach despite years of law enforcement pressure.

In May 2025, the Carabinieri, acting on orders from the Naples District Anti-Mafia Directorate (DDA), dismantled a drug trafficking network linked to the Mazzarella clan. They arrested 21 people on charges of mafia association, drug trafficking, illegal weapons possession, extortion, and mafia-style intimidation. Michele Mazzarella ("o fenomeno"), the clan's leader, directed operations from prison in Syracuse, Sicily. Two satellite groups operated under his command.

- The De Bernardo group (led by Rosario De Bernardo, brother of Vincenzo "o pisello", murdered in 2015) handled large-scale distribution of cocaine, crack, marijuana, and hashish, primarily in Somma Vesuviana.
- The Anastasio group (led by Raffaele Anastasio) ran extortion rackets targeting local businesses in Sant’Anastasia to fund clan operations and support imprisoned members.

The clan enforced a "drug market alliance" across its territory: street dealers either bought exclusively from the clan or paid a "peace tax" to operate. Key figures charged with leading the network include Salvatore Di Caprio, Salvatore Giannetti, and Fabio Annunziata, with operational roles attributed to Clemente Correale, Carmela Miranda, and Rosario De Bernardo. The year-long investigation relied on wiretaps and covert surveillance.

On 3 April 2026, Mazzarella clan head Roberto Mazzarella was arrested at a luxury resort in Vietri sul Mare on a murder charge.

== See also ==
- Camorra
- List of members of the Camorra
- Michele Zaza
- List of Camorra clans
- Contini clan
