= De Luca Bossa clan =

- Founded: 1990s
- Founded by: Antonio De Luca Bossa (‘O sicco)
- Founding location: Ponticelli, Naples
- Years active: 1990s – present
- Territory: Eastern suburbs of Naples; Cercola, Italy
- Leaders: Umberto De Luca Bossa (son of ‘O sicco)
- Activities: Racketeering extortion drug trafficking murder
- Allies: Marfella clan Rinaldi clan Secondigliano Alliance; Aprea-Cuccaro clan
- Rivals: Sarno clan (defunct); De Micco clan Mazzarella clan Mariano clan

The De Luca Bossa clan is a Neapolitan Camorra clan operating in the eastern suburbs of Naples, and more specifically in the area of Ponticelli and in the municipality of Cercola.

== History ==
The clan was founded by Antonio De Luca Bossa, known as ‘O sicco, in the 1990s. Antonio is the son of Umberto De Luca Bossa, who was a trusted member of the Nuova Camorra Organizzata and died from natural causes in 2008 after 18 years in jail.

In the late 1980s ‘O sicco started his criminal career as a ferocious killer for the once powerful Sarno clan. At the age of 17, he was arrested, accused of involvement in a massacre led by the Sarnos in which six people died, four of them by mistake. In the early 90s, Antonio became a trusted member of the Sarno clan, however, he decided to create his own clan, which ended in a bloody war between the then newly created clan and the Sarnos for the control of the territory. The war reached its peak, when, in 1998, ‘O sicco made the first attack with a car bomb in the Camorra's history, killing Luigi Amitrano, the nephew of the boss Vincenzo Sarno, the real target of the ambush. Eventually, Antonio De Luca Bossa was arrested and sentenced to life in prison.

In the 2000s, thanks to the relationship between Teresa De Luca Bossa, mother of Antonio, with Giuseppe Marfella, boss of the Marfella clan, based in Pianura, the forces of the two clans united in fighting the Lago clan. The reorganization in the clan takes place, adding the interest in regaining control over Ponticelli, taking advantage of fall of the Sarno clan, thanks to the large number of arrests and most of their bosses becoming pentiti. However, this time did not last long, in 2010 Teresa De Luca Bossa was arrested and the clan gradually lost control of the territory, disputed by rival clans, such as the D'Amico clan (called Fraulella) and the De Micco clan (called Bodo). In the years when Teresa De Luca Bossa was in command, the clan also made an alliance with the powerful Secondigliano Alliance.

Anna De Luca Bossa, sister of Antonio, is married to Ciro Minichini, a member of a criminal group also based in Ponticelli. They had a son, Antonio Minichini, who was killed in 2013 in the middle of the war between the De Luca Bossa and the De Micco clans. In September 2019, Anna was accused of involvement in the murder of Raffaele Cepparulo, leader of a small criminal group, and Ciro Colonna, an innocent victim. She was sentenced to life imprisonment. In the same trial, Michele Minichini, who was considered one of the leaders of the new era of the organization was also sentenced to life in prison. Minichini was known to have a good relationship with Ciro Rinaldi, boss of the Rinaldi clan, also based in the eastern part of Naples, making an alliance between the two clans.

== Leadership ==
- Antonio De Luca Bossa — Serving a life sentence.
- Teresa De Luca Bossa — Arrested.
- Anna De Luca Bossa — Serving a life sentence.
- Umberto De Luca Bossa (son of the boss 'O Sicco) — Allegedly the current leader of the organization.
- Emmanuel De Luca Bossa (son of the boss 'O Sicco) — Released in 2020.
- Michele Minichini, known as 'a tigre — Serving a life sentence.

== Activities ==
Pasquale Brunese, a drug trafficker working for the clan was arrested in Valencia, Spain, in 2015, after seven years hiding from the Italian police. In Spain, Brunese owned a restaurant and was living with a false name.

On October 31, 2019, Salvatore Ricciardi, considered an affiliate of the clan, was arrested by the Carabinieri on charges of having imposed the racket on a pizzeria in Cercola. According to investigators, Ricciardi is the "bagman" of the clan, designated to collect the racket money.

According to investigations, the leaders of the clan usually do numerous parties in the Ponticelli area, always inviting singers to live performances, one of their favorite singers is the neomelodic Anthony Ilardo, who is known for his relations with members of the Camorra.

On December 29, 2019, two "loan sharks" of the clan were arrested in Cercola, according to the investigations, in some cases they would impose usurious rates up to 720%.

== Present day ==
According to the reports of the DIA, by 2019, after a time of strong decline, the De Luca Bossa clan is believed to be gaining power again in the eastern area of Naples, thanks to the merger with emergent groups, in particular with the Minichini. In fact, according to investigations, the group is now considered the most powerful clan in Ponticelli and in much of the Vesuvian area.

On August 27, 2019, the Court of Naples issued an order for custody in prison for Emmanuel De Luca Bossa, the youngest son of 'O sicco. Emmanuel was already under house arrest for robbery and was found in possession of a gun during a recent search warrant.

In September 2019, Umberto De Luca Bossa, son of 'O sicco, was released from prison, after more than two years in jail, accused of illegal gun possession.

Also in September 2019, Tommaso Schisa, member of the Schisa's faction of the clan, became pentito. Schisa is said to have an important role in the alliance between the De Luca Bossa clan and the Rinaldi clan.

In February 2020, Emmanuel De Luca Bossa, was released from jail.

Since Umberto De Luca Bossa became new the leader of the organization, after his release from jail in 2019, was noticed the increase of the continuous and pressing extortion requests, exercised with threatening and even violent methods in the areas under the influence of the clan.

== See also ==
- Camorra
- List of Camorra clans
- Ponticelli
- Rinaldi clan
