= Giuliano clan =

Criminal organization

- Founded: Early 1950s
- Founded by: Pio Vittorio Giuliano
- Founding location: Forcella, Naples
- Years active: early 1950s-present By 2025, only a small faction of the organization is still active.
- Territory: Historic Centre of Naples, Italy.
- Criminal activities: Drug trafficking, money laundering, Racketeering, smuggling, prostitution, gambling
- Allies: Di Lauro clan Vollaro clan Rinaldi clan Licciardi clan
- Rivals: Currently, usually small emerging groups in central Naples.

The Giuliano clan is a powerful Neapolitan Camorra clan originating in the Forcella district of Naples. From the 1970s to the mid-1980s, the clan was the most powerful group of the Camorra in the city of Naples.

== History ==
The clan was founded by Pio Vittorio Giuliano (1926 - September 27, 2009), known as ‘o padrino in the early post-war years, primarily dedicated to cigarette smuggling. He had 11 children, among them Luigi, Erminia, Guglielmo, Carmine, and Raffaele Giuliano.

Since the 1950s, the organization started to accumulate a huge fortune. In fact, Pio Vittorio was considered one of the richest cigarette smugglers of Naples in the time, at its heyday the cigarette traffic alone gave to the Giuliano clan over 200 million lire a week. In the mid-1970s Luigi Giuliano, known as 'O rre (the king), replaced his father as head of the clan, making him the most powerful Camorra boss for the next 20 years.

The Giuliano family was widely known for their luxurious lifestyle. Family members were always seen in the company of influential people in trendy nightclubs. In the 1980s, photos of the former football player Diego Maradona posing with some of the sons of Pio Vittorio inside a huge shell-shaped bathtub with golden taps in one of the villas of the Giuliano family made the international newspaper headlines. In fact, Maradona was seen numerous times in the company of the Giulianos in parties, nightclubs and weddings.

=== War with the NCO ===
The Giuliano clan had been in good terms with the Nuova Camorra Organizzata, headed by Raffaele Cutolo until the first half of 1979, but the two organizations then broke out into conflict. Cutolo demanded to receive a cut from the Giuliano's illegal gambling centres and lottery system in his power base of Portici. Following this, the head of the Vollaro clan, Luigi Vollaro raised the idea of an anti-Cutolo alliance with Giuliano family. A provisional death squad was set up, which contributed to the dozens of gangland deaths that year. The breaking point was reached when the NCO tried to expand their territories into the Giuliano's stronghold of Forcella, Piazza Mercato and Via Duomo, in the centre of Naples. The clash, which had occurred in a period of growing tension between the historic Camorra clans and the newly created NCO, led to the formation of the Nuova Famiglia, consisting particularly of the Giuliano clan, the Zaza clan, then headed by Michele Zaza, the Nuvoletta clan and the Casalesi clan, headed at the time by Antonio Bardellino. After the defeat of Cutolo, the leaders of the Nuova Famiglia achieved absolute dominance over all criminal rackets in the city of Naples. Luigi Giuliano relinquished control of the Quartieri Spagnoli to the Di Biasi brothers, who then founded the Di Biasi clan (it).

=== 2000s ===
The Giuliano clan was headed by Luigi Giuliano for nearly thirty years. However, he was arrested in early 2000 and was succeeded by his sister, Erminia Giuliano. Erminia became the boss because the only direct male heir to the family business still unimprisoned was deemed inept. She was ranked as one of Italy's 30 most dangerous criminals, and eventually arrested on December 23, 2000, after being a fugitive for over 10 months.

In September 2002, Luigi Giuliano decided to collaborate with the Italian authorities and became a government witness, giving another hard blow to his organization. In 2006, his son Giovanni Giuliano was killed in retaliation.

Despite the marriage in 1996, between Marianna Giuliano, daughter of Luigi, with Michele Mazzarella, son of Vincenzo Mazzarella, one of the bosses of the Mazzarella clan, the two organizations have always been rivals, which culminated in several episodes of violence in the 2000s.

== Historical leaderships ==
- Pio Vittorio Giuliano, (1926 - September 27, 2009)
- Luigi Giuliano, known as 'O rre (Naples, November 3, 1949)
- Erminia Giuliano, known as Celeste (Naples December 31, 1955)

== The decline ==
Following the arrests and subsequent disassociation of most of the historical leaders of the Giuliano clan in the 2000s, the Mazzarella clan, taking advantage of the power vacuum left, begin to expand their territories to the centre of the city, which, in the 2010s, leads to a war between the third generation of the Giuliano family, those left, and the Mazzarellas. The third generation of the Giulianos along with other small groups aligned to them, such as the Amirante-Brunetti-Sibillo, is dubbed by the media "Paranza dei bambini". After years at war, in 2015 the Italian justice dealt a big blow against the Paranza dei bambini, arresting virtually the entire group. As of 2019, the group Giuliano-Amirante-Sibillo, known as Paranza dei bambini, due to the young age of its affiliates, was still active, but greatly weakened.

== Resurgence in the 2020s ==
After years of violent turf wars in the historic center of Naples, the Giuliano clan had seemingly buried the hatchet, only to resurface with renewed ambition. Together with elements of the Mazzarella clan, they allegedly formed a powerful criminal alliance aimed at regaining control over lucrative illegal activities in the central neighborhoods of Forcella, the Decumani, and the Case Nuove district. Now, that strategic alliance may lead to a courtroom reckoning. Following a major anti-mafia operation in July 2024 that led to 22 arrests, the Naples District Anti-Mafia Prosecutor's Office has requested a full trial for 29 individuals allegedly tied to the so-called Giuliano-Mazzarella cartel. Judge Federica Girardi has scheduled the preliminary hearing for February 24, 2026. Among those facing prosecution are key figures such as Salvatore Giuliano, known as 'o russo (now a cooperating witness), Salvatore “Bombolone” Giuliano, and Salvatore Barile, a nephew of historic Mazzarella bosses. Barile and 'o russo are believed to have brokered the truce that enabled the formation of the super-clan, reasserting territorial dominance through a mix of drug trafficking, extortion, armed robbery, and even the sale of hospital jobs, all enforced through mafia-style violence and coercion. The charges include mafia association and a wide range of aggravated crimes. Many of the defendants are expected to request abbreviated trials, depending on legal strategy. The arrest operation, carried out on July 10, 2024, was the culmination of two parallel investigations by Naples' Mobile Squad, the Carabinieri Investigative Unit, and the judicial police at the Vicaria-Mercato precinct. Authorities reconstructed the criminal network’s activity in Forcella, La Maddalena, San Gaetano, and the Case Nuove, revealing a dense web of control imposed by the Giuliano clan in cooperation with their longtime rivals-turned-allies, the Mazzarella clan. This criminal “union” marks a dramatic evolution for both groups, once bitter enemies.

== See also ==
- Camorra
- List of members of the Camorra
- List of Camorra clans
- Di Lauro clan
- Nuova Famiglia
- Mazzarella clan
