= List of Camorra clans =

This is a comprehensive list of Camorra clans and their place of origin. A clan is a basic unit in the Camorra, a criminal organization originating in Campania. Currently it is estimated there are about 111 Camorra clans, and about 7,000 full members.

== Province of Avellino ==
=== Quindici ===
- Cava clan
- Graziano clan

== Province of Caserta ==
=== Casal di Principe ===
- Casalesi clan
- De Angelis, Taliercio clan (affiliates)

=== Maddaloni ===
- Farina clan (defunct)

=== Marcianise ===
- Belforte clan

=== Mondragone ===
- La Torre clan (defunct)

=== Pignataro Maggiore ===
- Lubrano-Ligato clan (defunct)

== Metropolitan City of Naples ==
=== Afragola ===
- Moccia clan
- Magliulo clan (defunct)

=== Bacoli ===
- Pariante clan

=== Castellammare di Stabia ===
- D'Alessandro clan
- Cesarano clan
- Omobono-Scarpa clan (defunct)

=== Ercolano ===
- Ascione clan
- Birra clan (defunct)

=== Giugliano in Campania ===
- Mallardo clan

=== Marano di Napoli ===
- Abbinante clan
- Nuvoletta clan (defunct)
- Polverino clan
- Orlando clan

=== Naples ===
- Aprea-Cuccaro clan
- Mazzarella clan
- Giuliano clan (defunct)
- Puccinelli clan
- Cimmino clan
- Contini clan
- Esposito clan
- Lago clan (defunct)
- De Luca Bossa clan
- Sarno clan (defunct)
- D'Amico clan (defunct)
- D'Ausilio
- Di Biasi clan (defunct)
- Giannello clan
- Mariano clan
- Di Lauro clan
- Ricci clan
- Russo clan (Quartieri Spagnoli) (defunct)
- Lo Russo clan (defunct)
- Terracciano clan
- Pagnozzi clan
- Potenza clan (defunct)
- Rinaldi clan
- Misso clan (defunct)
- Perrella clan (defunct)
- Licciardi clan
- Sacco-Bocchetti clan

=== Nola ===
- Russo clan (Nola)

=== San Giuseppe Vesuviano ===
- Fabbrocino clan

=== Poggiomarino ===
- Galasso clan (defunct)

=== Pozzuoli ===
- Beneduce-Longobardi clan

=== Portici ===
- Vollaro clan

=== San Giorgio a Cremano ===
- Abate clan (defunct)
- Troia clan

=== Sant'Antimo ===
- Puca clan
- Verde clan
- Ranucci clan (defunct)

=== Saviano ===
- Alfieri clan (defunct)

=== Torre Annunziata ===
- Gionta clan
- Gallo-Cavalieri clan
- Tamarisco clan

=== Boscotrecase/Boscoreale ===
- Vangone-Limelli clan

=== Torre del Greco ===
- Falanga clan
- Gargiulo clan (defunct)

== Province of Salerno ==
=== Battipaglia ===
- Pecoraro-Renna clan

=== Eboli ===
- Maiale clan

=== Salerno ===
- D'Agostino-Panella clan

=== Scafati ===
- Matrone clan
