= Honoured Society =

Term used to the Camorra in the 19th century

Honoured Society (Italian: Onorata società) was a term used by the Neapolitan Camorra, who defined their organisation in this way in the 19th century to allude to the defence of their honour, which consisted of omertà, that is, the mafia code of silence and the obligation not to speak to the police about the organisation's internal affairs.

In the end of the 19th century the term was often used also to define the Sicilian and Calabrian crime groups (Cosa nostra and the 'Ndrangheta) due to the analogies with the "code of honour" of the Camorra.

The Honoured Society in Australia is a Calabrian 'Ndrangheta criminal confederation, started in Melbourne and currently active in all of Australia.

.
