= Ciro Mazzarella =

Italian Camorrista (1940 – 2018)

- Born: 2 April 1940; Naples, Italy
- Died: 2 September 2018 (aged 78); Naples, Italy
- Other name: 'o Scellone
- Occupations: Founder and former head of the Mazzarella clan
- Known for: Cigarette smuggler and Camorra boss
- Allegiance: Mazzarella clan / Camorra

Ciro Mazzarella (Naples, 2 April 1940 – Naples, 2 September 2018) was a historical Italian Camorrista, known in the media as the "king of cigarette smuggling", founder of the Mazzarella clan and was one of the last remaining leaders of a bygone era of the Camorra.

== History ==
Born in a family of important Camorra members, Ciro Mazzarella aka 'o Scellone, was nephew of Michele Zaza, and considered his successor in the business. At the beginning he worked for his uncle's powerful clan, known in that time as the Zaza clan, but soon started his own business, specifically in the 1960s, buying small ships and starting his own smuggling empire, since then, he quickly demonstrated his entrepreneurial abilities. During that decade, he founded the Mazzarella clan, becoming independent from the Zaza clan, led by his uncle.

'O Scellone had also good relationships with other powerful bosses of the Camorra, such as Mario Fabbrocino and Alfredo Maisto. He was also seen in the company of Vincenzo Casillo of the Nuova Camorra Organizzata, in fact, Mazzarella never took a side in the war between the Nuova Famiglia and the NCO, despite the top position his uncle Michele Zaza held inside the NF.

The clan he created, despite having become very powerful, has been involved in several wars over the decades, in particular the factions led by his brothers, Gennaro and Vincenzo. One of the most striking examples of wars in which his clan was involved, was with the Contini clan, which led to the murder of his father, Francesco Mazzarella.

Ciro Mazzarella was also known for having strong relations with the Sicilian Mafia, in particular with the Catania Mafia family. According to justice collaborators, the late boss of the Catanian mafia, Giuseppe Calderone was the godfather in the baptism of one of the Mazzarella's sons.

== Mazzarella's criminal empire ==
In the early 1990s Mazzarella had already amassed a great wealth, and in 1992 he decided to move to Switzerland, after losing a war between Camorra clans in Naples. From his logistics base in Lugano, he created an enviable economic empire with cigarette smuggling that arrived from Montenegro. According to numerous investigations, during the early 1990s, Mazzarella would have several contacts in the top echelons of the Montenegro's government, and supposedly reached agreements with the Montenegrin politician Milo Đukanović. Mazzarella also conspired to gain control of Montenegrin government warehouses, which he would hold through a Panamanian company called Gisto, based in Lugano. According to the parliamentary inquiry commission of 1996, Ciro Mazzarella headed a true illegal empire: 200 billion lire in turnover, for a net profit of over 6 billion lire monthly (€4.4 million monthly, in today's exchange). In 2002 Mazzarella was arrested in Spain, and after his release from prison in 2006, he returned to live in Naples.

== Later years ==
After his return to Naples, Mazzarella used to be much more reserved. Rarely in the news, in the early 2010s he decided to collaborate on an autobiography made by the author Fabrizio Capecelatro. The book was published in 2013.

On 2 September 2018 Ciro Mazzarella died in his villa in the affluent neighbourhood of Posillipo, Naples, at the age of 78.

== See also ==
- Mazzarella clan
- Camorra
- Michele Zaza
- List of members of the Camorra
