= Somma Vesuviana =

- Comune
- Comune di Somma Vesuviana
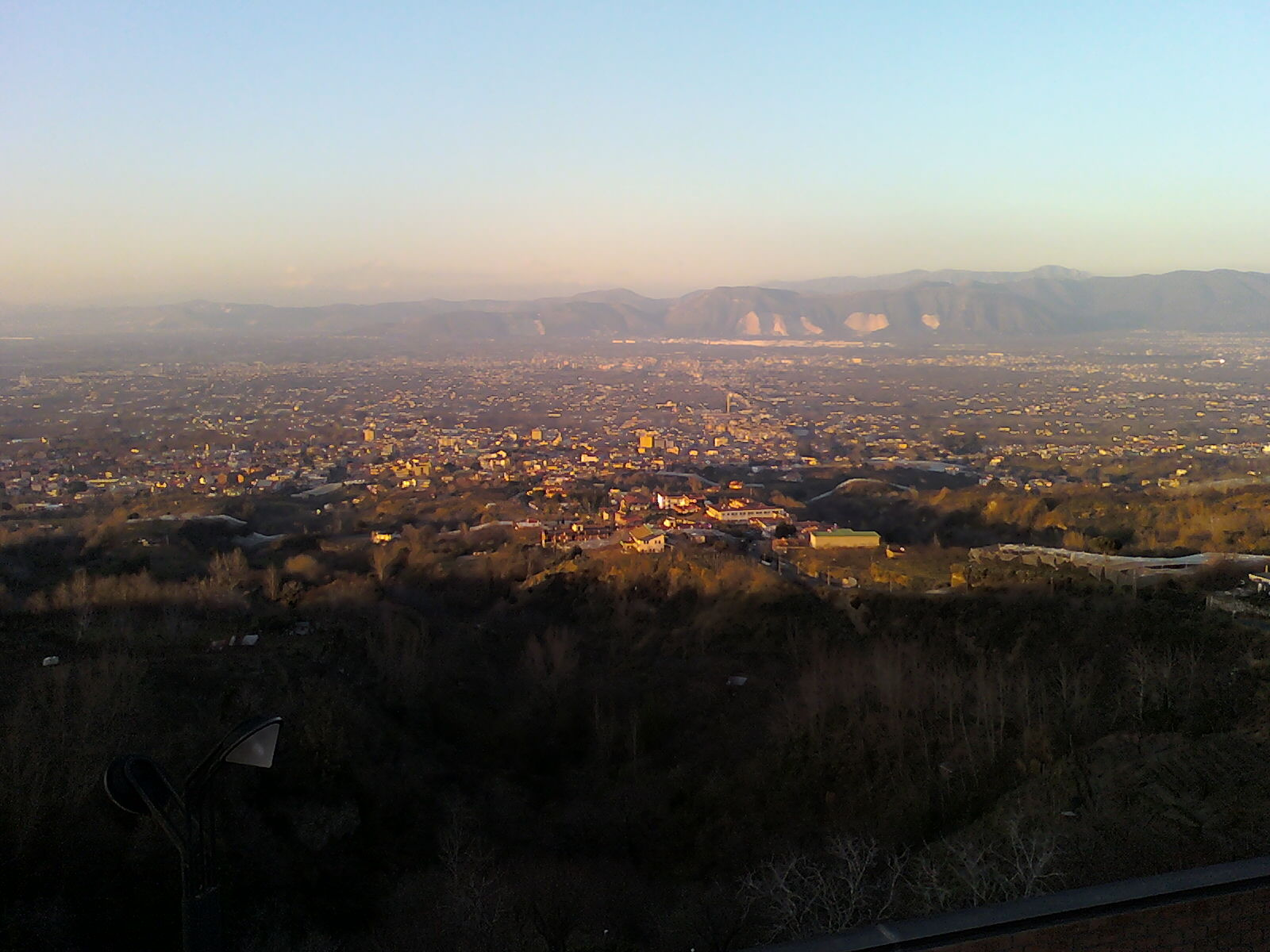
- Panorama di Somma Vesuviana

- Coat of arms

- Location within Italy Location within Campania
- Coordinates: 40°52′21″N 14°26′13″E
- Country: Italy
- Region: Campania
- Metropolitan city: Naples (NA)
- Frazioni: Somma, Mercato Vecchio, Casamale, Rione Trieste, Santa Maria del Pozzo, Starza della Regina, San Sossio

Government
  - Mayor: Salvatore di Sarno

Area
  - Total: 30.74 km^{2} (11.87 sq mi)
- Elevation: 165 m (541 ft)

Population (December 2021)
  - Total: 33,935
  - Density: 1,104/km^{2} (2,859/sq mi)
- Demonym: Sommesi
- Time zone: UTC+1 (CET)
  - Summer (DST): UTC+2 (CEST)
- Postal code: 80049
- Dialing code: 081
- Patron saint: St. Januarius
- Saint day: 19 September
- Website: Official website

Somma Vesuviana is a town and comune in the Metropolitan City of Naples, Campania, southern Italy.

== History ==
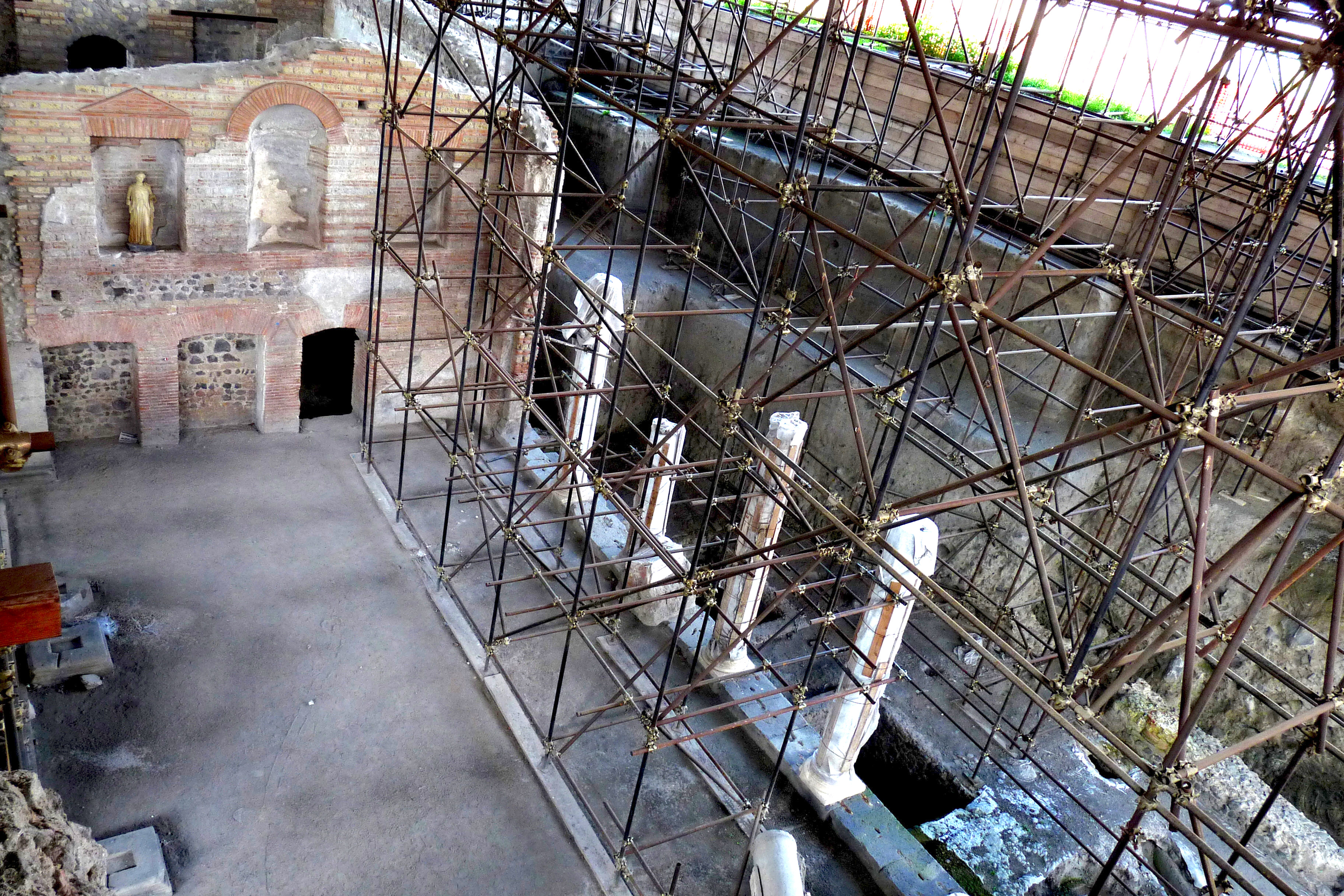
Colonnade of Villa of Augustus

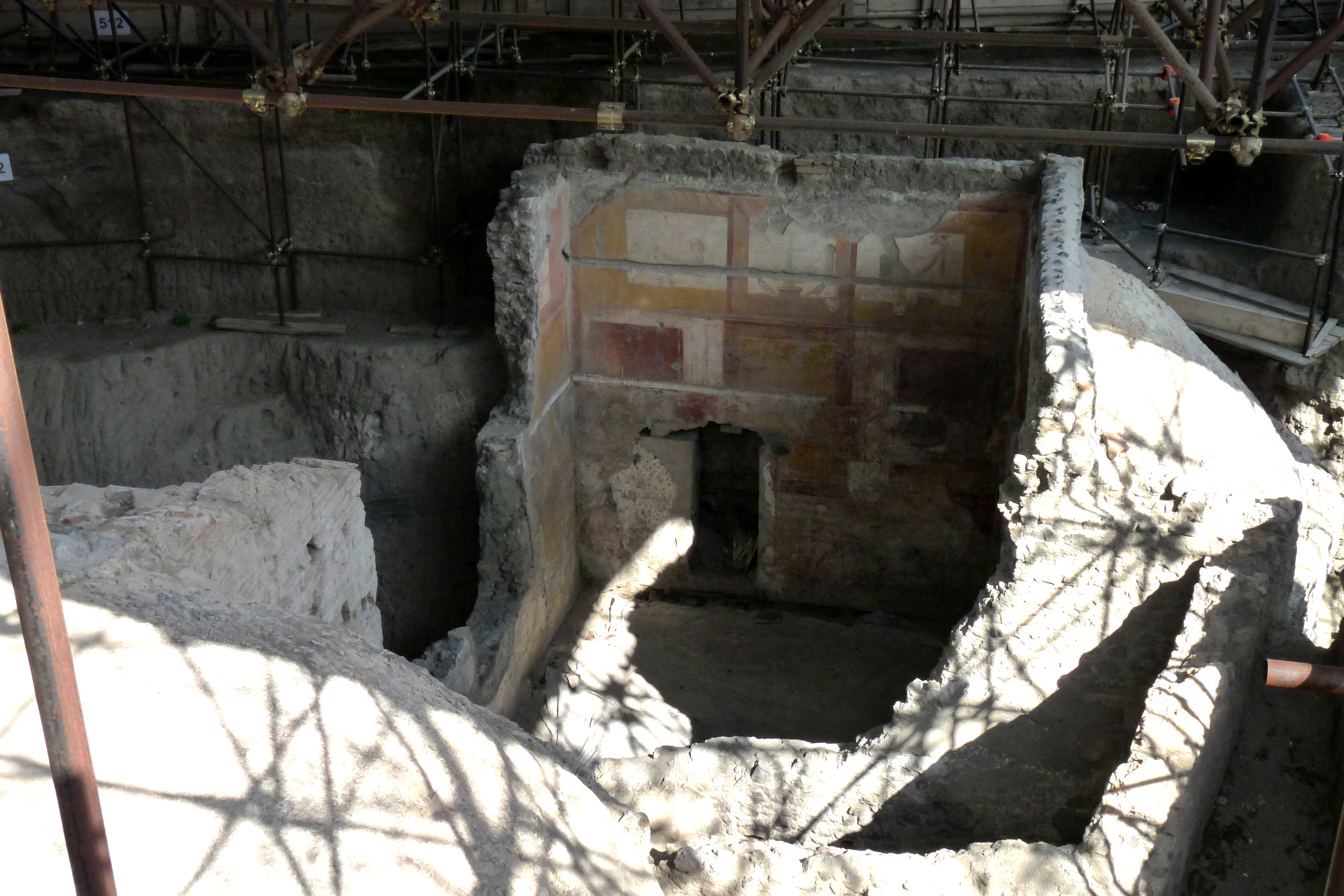
Roman Villa of Augustus

Before the Roman colonisation, the area of today's Somma Vesuviana was probably inhabited by Italic peoples like Samnites and Oscans.

According to Strabo, the city was founded by the same group of Osci who founded Herculaneum and who called the city Sommax. The city was founded by a group of plebeians led by Tiberius Gracchus who called the city "Saxo Tribunum" (city of the plebeians).

Later, it became a resort for rich patricians from Rome and other rich estate owners who built magnificent villas in the area.

Excavations have shown that the north side of the Vesuvius volcano was equally as populated as the southern side where Pompeii and Herculaneum lie, but has not been paid as much attention by historians. The area was finally buried during the eruption of Vesuvius of 472 AD but the Eruption of Mount Vesuvius in 79 (which buried Pompeii etc.) had previously buried and damaged the earlier villa over which the later villa was built.

== Excavations ==
A large Roman villa was discovered in the 1930s in the frazione of Starza della Regina and due to its size, later interpreted as that of emperor Augustus at Nola where he probably passed his last days of life.

Baths of a Roman villa were also discovered in nearby Pollena Trocchia in 1988 and subsequently excavated.

== Main sights ==
The historic centre and the surrounding area retain their ancient appearance.

The site of Saxo Tribunum was said to have been discovered in 1997 by the amateur archaeologist Nicola Sannuto.

=== The village of Casamale ===
The village that takes its name from the aristocratic Causamala family, which appears for the first time in a lease deed of 1011. The ancient Aragonese walls surround the village, consolidated in 1467 by King Ferrante of Aragon. These walls were used to contain the embankments around the "Terra Murata". Four gates opened along the walls: Porta Terra (or Porta San Pietro) located on the north side; Porta Formosi (or Porta Marina) located on the west side; porta della Montagna (or porta Castello) located on the south side; Porta Piccioli (or Porta All Saints) located on the east side.

The central nucleus of the Casamale is an ecclesiastical building, the convent of the Hermit Fathers of Sant'Agostino, with the chapel first dedicated to San Giacomo and then, after the construction of the church, to Santa Maria della Sanità. In 1595, the church was awarded the title of Collegiate, changing the name of Santa Maria Maggiore. The Casamale enclosed within its walls, in addition to the imposing Collegiata, convents and palaces of the aristocracy, which only partially occupied the insulae. These lands were gradually occupied and inhabited by settlers, traders and artisans. The ancient medieval village of Casamale is still intact, despite the evident traces of tampering consisting of concrete interventions between the ancient stone walls.

The village develops on the ridge of Monte Somma, between 180 and 220 m a.s.l. and consists of a space delimited by ancient walls, still clearly visible today, which identify a clear border with the rest of the town. The village is cleverly protected to the south by Mount Somma, to the east by the Fosso dei Leoni riverbed and to the west by the Cavone del Purgatorio riverbed. Around the centre, the current Collegiata, a medieval system developed, made up of narrow streets, some arches, with the roofs of the houses that seem to touch, not allowing the sun to filter through. The buildings are grey in colour, and there are often important piperno entrance arches. The balconies of the houses, decorated with wrought iron parapets, are slightly protruding and are set on robust thresholds in worked piperno. Architectural elements of the 16th, 17th and 18th centuries stand next to the medieval buildings, including Palazzo Colletta-Orsini, Palazzo Basadonna, the monastery of the Carmelite Nuns, and Palazzo Secondulfo. This important heritage of art and culture has undergone numerous manipulations, which have destroyed in a short time structures that had remained intact for centuries.

==== The church of San Domenico ====
The church of San Domenico rises in the heart of Somma Vesuviana and, with the consent of Pope Nicolò IV, was built by King Charles II of Anjou in 1294. It was later entrusted to the Preachers of the order of the Dominicans. The Angevin origin of the church is recalled by a canvas, the work of Cacciapuoti and placed behind the altar, depicting Charles II of Anjou kneeling at the feet of the Virgin and San Domenico who sanctifies. The church was dedicated to Santa Maddalena.

The monastic complex established itself as a cultural centre and as a venue for important economic-patrimonial transactions and for the management of income from its extensive real estate accumulated through bequests, donations and purchases. On the floor of the church, some tombstones recall the burial of characters who, over the centuries, gave life to Somma Vesuviana. The waters of the cistern located in the cloister have quenched the thirst of the local population for centuries. The cloister was also for a long time the seat of the meetings of the Mayor and of the city parliament, a privilege abolished by the Viceroy of Naples in 1696.

Numerous catastrophic events, including the 1631 eruption, caused collapses and consequent restoration and change interventions. In the eighteenth century, due to many restorations, the underlying Gothic structures were made illegible In 1794, another eruption caused the collapse of some structures, and with the subsequent reconstruction, the current façade was built against the existing one. With the second abolition of religious orders (1861-1866), the church and convent were given ownership of the municipality of Somma Vesuviana. The church was entrusted to a rector appointed from time to time by the municipal council. Some rooms of the convent were instead used as municipal headquarters and for other public offices, political, cultural, recreational and welfare organizations. After the 1980 Irpinia earthquake the church was declared unfit for use, and only later were restoration and static rehabilitation works carried out.

The facade of the church today is characterized by a narrow pronaos maintained by two Ionic columns, which is accessed by a staircase in piperno. The pronaos continues to the second order, with a recessed space enclosed by a balustrade. Six semi-columns articulate the facade, four of which are a direct extension of the pronaos below. Above this second order, a circle-shaped window hides the rose window of the ancient Gothic façade. Above this is the tympanum. The internal space, with a single nave, is preceded by a vestibule with Corinthian columns on which the monks' choir was located. The side chapels and the square apse are decorated with exquisitely crafted stuccos. Canvases by great authors of the 17th and 18th centuries enrich the chapels, while the canvas by Cacciapuoti is placed in the apse. The presence of many seventeenth and eighteenth-century tombstones documents the importance and nobility of the church.

== Anthropogenic geography ==
=== Suburbs ===
In 2011, the municipality applied for the title of city, which was then obtained in 2012, by decree of the President of the Italian Republic. Its frazione are: Centro Storico Casamale, Crocelle Camaldoli, Fornaro, Lupa, Masseria Allocca, Matarazzo, Mercato Vecchio, Musciabuono, Paradiso, Pizzone Cassante, Reviglione, Rione Trieste, San Sossio, Santa Maria delle Grazie in Castello, Santa Maria del Pozzo, Starza della Regina.

== Society ==
Somma Vesuviana had a population of 33,935 in 2021.

=== Foreign residents ===
Foreign residents in Somma Vesuviana are estimated at 1,179 people; the most numerous foreign minorities are Ukrainians, Sri Lankans, Chinese, Poles, Moroccans and Romanians.

Ukrainians: 428

Romanians: 205

Moroccans: 102

Chinese: 62

Sri Lankans: 42

Poles: 38

== Politics ==
=== Mayors ===
Period		Office holder	Party	Title	Notes
1946	1948	Michele Pellegrino	Indipendente		
1948	1950	Paolo Emilio Restaino	DC		
1950	1951	Eugenio Testa	DC		
1951	1952	Emanuele Sessa		Commissario prefettizio	
1952	1953	Francesco De Siervo	DC		
1953	1955	Giuseppe Aliperta	DC		
1955	1956	Michele Troianiello	DC		
1956	1960	Francesco De Siervo	DC		
1960	1964	Francesco De Siervo	DC		
1964	1967	Francesco De Siervo	DC		
1967	1967	Roberto D'Amato		Prefectural Commissioner	
1967	1970	Carmine Mocerino	DC		
1970	1971	Francesco De Siervo	DC		
1971	1976	Antonio D'Ambrosio	DC		
1976	1981	Francesco De Siervo	DC		
1981	1983	Nicolò Iossa	PSI		
1983	1985	Cimmino Tancredi	PSI		
1985	1987	Antonio Piccolo	DC		
1987	1988	Giovambattista Mastrosimone	Prefectural Commissioner		
1988	1990	Vittorio Piccolo	DC		
1990	1993	Antonio Piccolo	DC		
1993	1997	Alfonso Auriemma	DC		
1997	2000	Carmine Mocerino	PPI		
2000	2001	Fiamma Spena		Prefectural Commissioner	
2001	2003	Vincenzo D'Avino	L'Ulivo		
2003	2005	Mariaguia Federico		Prefectural Commissioner	
2005	2006	Cataldo Bianchi		Extraordinary commissioner	
2006	2008	Raffaele Allocca	AN		
2008	2013	Raffaele Allocca	PdL		
2013	2014	Raffaele Allocca	FI		
2014	2014	Franca Fico		Prefectural Commissioner	
2014	2017	Pasquale Piccolo	FdI		
2017	2017	Caterina Iovino		Prefectural Commissioner	
2017	2022	Salvatore Di Sarno	UdC		
2022	in carica	Salvatore Di Sarno			

== Culture and traditions ==
=== Traditions of Monte Somma ===
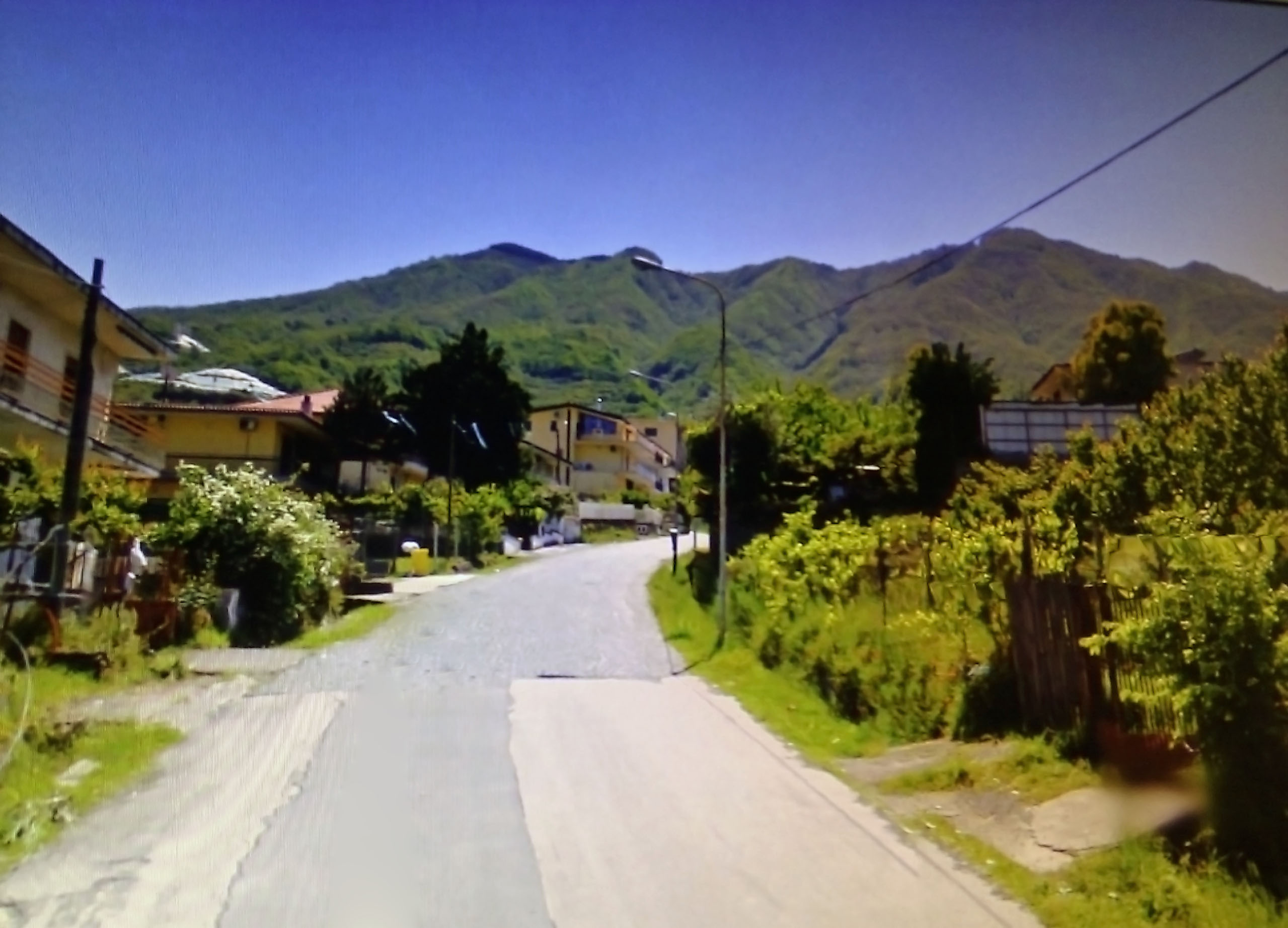
Monte Somma S.Maria

It is tradition every year to go to Mount Somma on the Saturday after Easter and on 3 May, to celebrate the festival of the edge; those who participate divide into paranza and scale the mountain.

The Saturday after Easter is known as the Saturday of the fireworks. On this day, the parishioners go to the sanctuary of the Madonna at the top of Mount Somma Vesuviana to pay homage to the Madonna with singing hymns.

On the other hand, 3 May, also known as Three of the Cross, is the closing day of the festival. The demonstrations are the same as the Saturday of the fires but the symbolism activated in the circumstances is that of thanksgiving for the abundant harvest.

=== Palio of Somma Vesuviana ===
Popular festival held every year in the second week of September on Fridays, Saturdays and Sundays, organized by the "Youth for a United World" group, is an artistic event based on the concept of rediscovering the popular values and traditions of a time of the country starting from the ancient Magister Nundinarum to the charm of ancient crafts, from the consumption of local gastronomic products to the wonderful challenges in the games between the districts; the proceeds are entirely donated to finance humanitarian projects especially in Africa.

=== San Gennaro day ===
On 19 September of each year, the festival dedicated to San Gennaro, patron saint of the city, takes place.

== Sport ==
=== Football ===
In the municipality, there is the "Felice Nappi" municipal stadium, where the home matches of the Viribus Unitis football team were played.

The municipality boasts 2 teams: Viribus Unitis plays in promotion to the sixth level of the Italian championship. Viribus Unitis 100 militant in the first category, seventh level of the Italian championship.

The Felice Nappi stadium is currently out of service due to works and has 2,500 seats.

=== Cycling ===
The sixth stage of the 2023 Giro d'Italia passed in Somma Vesuviana.

== Cuisine ==
The typical Campanian products of Somma Vesuviana, Naples, are the yellow Vesuvius tomato (the cultivation, entirely by hand, takes place on support poles that keep the fruit separate from the earth), the Vesuvius apricot, the Monte cherry (or durona del Monte) with a sour aftertaste, Vesuvius plums and Catalan grapes, sweet and with white flesh, a table grape only recently used also for winemaking.
