= Ponticelli =

Eastern suburb of Naples, southern Italy

Coordinates: 40°50′N 14°19′E

- Quarter of Naples
- Santa Maria della Neve church

- Location of Ponticelli within Naples
- Country: Italy
- Region: Campania
- City: Naples
- Municipalità: 6th

Area
  - Total: 9.11 km^{2} (3.52 sq mi)

Population
  - Total: 52,284
  - Density: 5,740/km^{2} (14,900/sq mi)
- Demonym: ponticellesi
- Postal code: 80147

Ponticelli is an eastern quarter of Naples, Italy. It has a population of some 50,000 inhabitants.

== Geography ==
It is located inland, near the highway connections of the city; Barra lies to the south. Ponticelli ends with San Giorgio a Cremano, Volla and Cercola. It is part of Comune di Napoli. The River Sebeto crossed the territory of Ponticelli till 1950, when it was covered. The area was humid and covered by water. Between 1930 and 1950 the land was urbanized.

== History ==
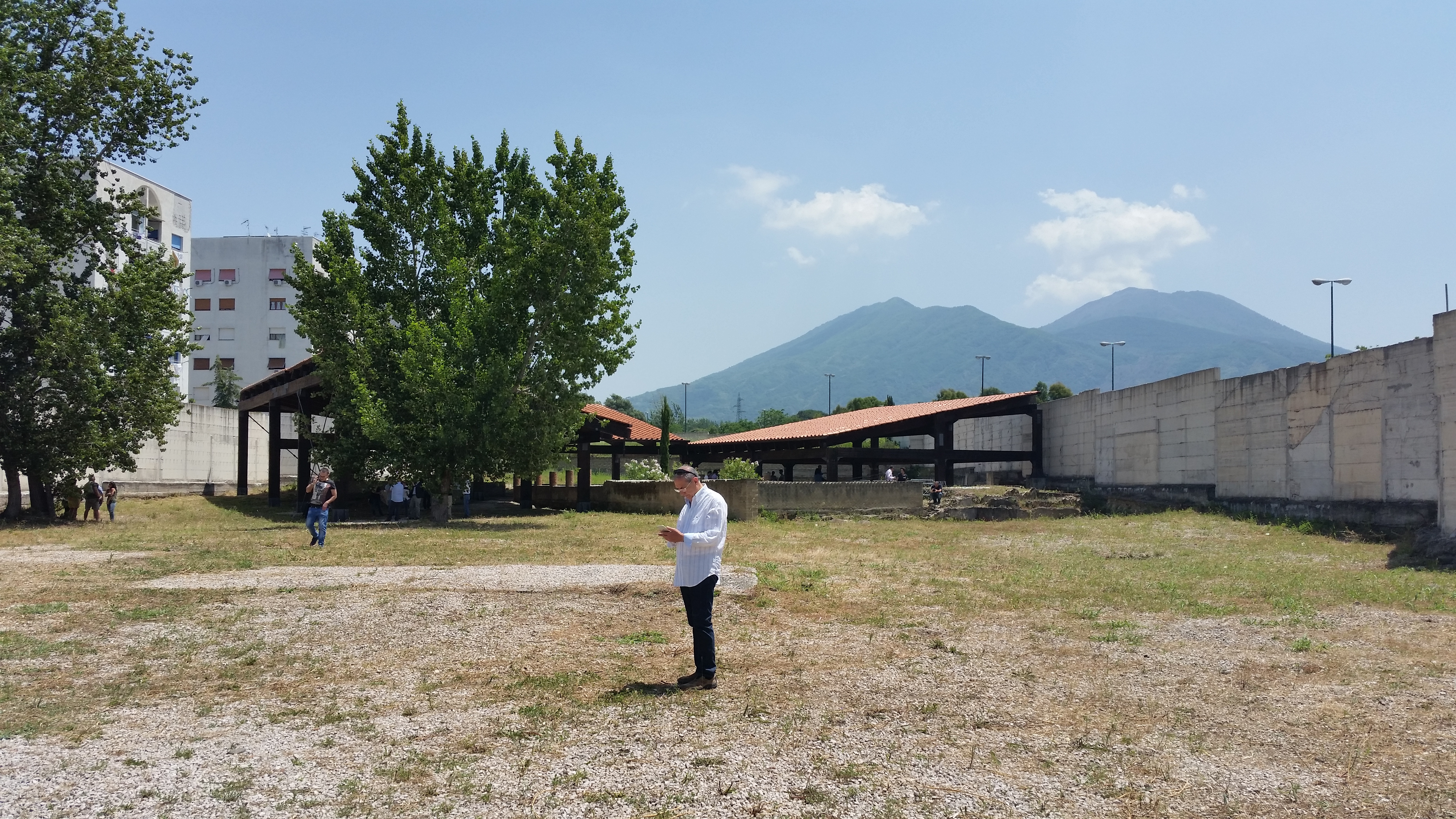
Villa Caius Olius Ampliatus

The name comes from the medieval period, during which it was called Ponticello and it was divided in two parts: big Ponticello and little Ponticello. Only in 1947 it became a plural noun because of the union of the two sections.

Two ancient Roman villae rusticae were found in 1985, later excavated in 1987 and 2007. They were buried following the eruption of Vesuvius in 79 AD which led to a sudden abandonment of the villa by its inhabitants. One in via Decio Mure was completely unearthed and it was possible to recover a large part of the furnishings in use in the house at the time of the eruption. This villa belonged to Caius Olius Ampliatus, a descendant of a veteran of Sulla and was focussed on production of olive oil and wine. It was a farm divided into agricultural and urban parts.

With an area of at least 2000 sqm., it was centred on a colonnaded portico and with rooms distributed into production areas and residential parts. South of the porticoed garden are the rooms dedicated to agricultural processing. In addition to rooms for bread making, there are rooms for the production with a small press of olive oil in enough quantity for the inhabitants. In the same area are larger rooms for production of wine with a large press wine and large cellar with dolia. There was also tank for the fermentation of the must (lacus).

In the basement of this villa the skeleton of a man was found in a crouching position with his hands on his face no doubt surprised by the eruption. He had a ring with the seal of the owner fused on a finger (due to the temperature of the volcanic ash). He was aged forty, probably a slave, toothless (due to malnutrition) and with several fractures. This discovery on this side of Vesuvius was important in showing that the eruption of 79 included not only rain of ash and lapilli, but also the pyroclastic flow at a temperature of 500 °C leading to burning of the skull and possible liquefaction of the brain.

During the mediaeval period, in particular during the first part of the XIII century, there was the construction of a basilica in Ponticelli which is the Basilica Santuario di Santa Maria della Neve.

The area was incorporated into the city of Naples under Fascist rule and was heavily bombed in World War II. The area has suffered much the same fate of urban decay as the rest of the eastern periphery of Naples, a fate that includes drugs, entrenched organized crime, unemployment, massive overbuilding since the end of World War II and a large influx of illegal immigrant workers. The quarter of Ponticelli was the first to revolt against the Nazis, starting the Four days of Naples. Radio London gave the first notice of the riots. The riot ended with the arrival of Nazi troops. After the war, the city was known as "borgo rosso" since the high percentage of vote given to Communist party.

== Villa of Caius Olius Ampliatus ==
The entrance has two lintels that still bear the signs of the hinges of a double-leaf door, closed at night by a horizontal iron rod. The road which this gate faced was the confluence of those from Herculaneum and Nola.

There was a large dining room with a window overlooking Mount Vesuvius, while behind it was an internal vegetable or decorative garden.

A central portico divided the residential area from the productive one where it met the oletum, the area for pressing olives, as evidenced by the remains of a millstone. The farmyard overlooked a large field that, at the time of the eruption, was probably used as a pasture or had been damaged due to the numerous earthquakes before the eruption.

The pistrinum was rather small and contained an oven, suitable for baking bread only for the family, and a millstone in volcanic stone formed in the lower part by a conical part below and in the upper part by a biconical part where the grain was inserted to be ground.

The wine cellar, which in ancient times had a roof, includes numerous dolia, terracotta containers of various sizes designed to ferment the wine and in such a number that the presence of a vineyard can also be hypothesised.

== Feast of Madonna della Neve ==
Ponticelli is also famous for a religious feast: the Feast of Madonna della Neve. It is celebrated on August fifth because it is said that in 1988 it snowed on that day. It incorporates a wagon with a statue of the Madonna on it; every fifty years people put the golden Madonna on a wagon. Many people do it for a sense of devotion, while others take part in the feast only to have visibility in the suburb. The procession of the wagon happens on the first Sunday after the fifth of August; if the fifth of August happens on a Sunday, the procession is on that day. During the festivity day, the wagon goes around Ponticelli to bless all the families and all the houses. When the Madonna arrives back at the church, people listen to mass and then sing a song called "Goodnight Mary", during which people wave white napkins as a mark of respect for the Madonna.

== Murales Park ==
Ponticelli is an inner city area, but there are a lot of people who try to raise up the quartier. In particular, there are some murals which depict social and cultural problems, like 'O scior cchiù felice made by Fabio Petani or Ael. Tutt'egual song 'e criature made by Jorit.
