= Vincenzo Licciardi =

Italian criminal (born 1965)

- Born: 27 June 1965 (age 61); Secondigliano, Naples, Italy
- Other name: 'o Chiatto
- Occupations: Former head of the Licciardi clan, and former leader of the Secondigliano Alliance
- Relatives: Gennaro Licciardi (brother); Maria Licciardi (sister)
- Status: Imprisoned
- Criminal charges: Conspiracy to commit murder, and other crimes

Vincenzo Licciardi (Italian pronunciation: [vinˈtʃɛntso litˈtʃardi]; born June 27, 1965) is the boss of the Licciardi clan, and one of the main leaders of the Secondigliano Alliance, a Camorra crime syndicate operating in Naples and the surrounding Campania region. His nickname is 'o Chiatto ("Fatso").

== Biography ==
=== Early career ===
Born and raised in the Neapolitan suburb of Secondigliano, Licciardi was from a powerful family of Camorristi going back a few generations. His father was a well known guappo or local boss in the 1950s. In 1994, Licciardi became the regent of the Licciardi clan whose traditional strongholds included not only its home base in the district of Secondigliano, but also to Scampia, Chiaiano, Miano and San Pietro a Patierno. The clan was previously headed by his brother, Gennaro Licciardi, nicknamed 'a scigna (The monkey), who died of blood poisoning while in the prison of Voghera on August 3, 1994.

However, an arrest in the mid-nineties prevented him from taking control and propelled his sister Maria Licciardi into the top spot as boss of the Licciardi clan, and therefore, as head of the Secondigliano Alliance, a coalition of powerful Camorra clans which controls drug trafficking and the extortion rackets against shopkeepers in many Neapolitan suburbs. Under her leadership, the Secondigliano Alliance become more organized, secretive, sophisticated and consequently more powerful.

=== Camorra boss ===
After the arrest of his sister on June 15, 2001, Licciardi took over as a supreme head of the Secondigliano Alliance along with Paolo Di Lauro and Edoardo Contini. Apart from the dominant Licciardi clan, the alliance consisted of the Contini, Di Lauro, Mallardo and Lo Russo clans. The preceding gang wars between the many Camorra clans that constituted the alliance, led to a severe weakening of the confederation as well as unwanted police attention on its activities. Like his sister, Vincenzo was very cautious and never used the phone to communicate with his underlings, instead using small handwritten encrypted notes, similar to the Pizzini used by the Corleonesi boss, Bernardo Provenzano. Throughout his reign, Licciardi's main activity covered the illegal trafficking of clothing, which due to a sophisticated international network, which has also allowed the laundering of money from other criminal activities such as drug trafficking and extortion.

=== Evading justice ===
Licciardi became wanted by the Italian police in 2003, after having served a year in prison for a previous conviction. The following year, in July 2004, an arrest warrant was issued against him for conspiracy to commit murder, and a list of other crimes. He was also added to the list of thirty most dangerous fugitives in Italy. In 2005, an international warrant was issued and his name was included in the "special program of research" in the direction of the Central Criminal Police. While a fugitive, Licciardi had managed to evade capture on at least three occasions, once fleeing through the network of sewers. Several sightings of Licciardi were reported abroad, particularly in Portugal, Spain and France. He allegedly travelled to these places in order to maintain contacts with the Magliari clan, which controls many drug routes in Europe.

=== Capture ===
After five years on the run, Licciardi was arrested on February 7, 2008, in Cuma, near the city of Naples. He was found hiding in the apartment of distant relatives, where he lived with his wife. During his arrest, he surrendered peacefully and offered no resistance. The detection of the hide-out was made possible through the use of sophisticated technologies. Licciardi's arrest came around the same time as that of a massive anti-Mafia sweep in Italy and the United States. A large anti-Mafia operation code-named "Old Bridge" involved arrest warrants issued against a total of ninety mafiosi and mob associates of key Italian and US families who controlled drug trafficking between the two sides of the Atlantic.

When Licciardi was escorted to prison by police officials, turmoil erupted among his relatives and the relatives of other Camorristi, with shouting, jostling, and tense moments. After his arrest, Gennaro Cirelli succeeded Licciardi as boss of the clan.

Piero Grasso, the national anti-Mafia prosecutor commented: "Licciardi's arrest is another success in the capture of fugitives of opposing clans that were involved in the feud in Secondigliano in recent years. There has moved forward in the complete destruction of the clan that up to today have caused dozens of deaths in the streets of Naples. The capture of Licciardi, for the brilliant way in which it was executed by the police, represents a step forward in the fight against the Camorra."

=== Aftermath ===
On June 15, 2008, his younger sister Patrizia and his brother-in-law Eduardo Marano, known as dino dinuccio were arrested by the Carabinieri and charged with the extortion of an entrepreneur from Casoria. The entrepreneur was contemplating suicide and had reported the extortion attempt to the Carabinieri. The two individuals had long been controlled by the policemen, who were later arrested thanks to the entrepreneur’s collaboration.

On July 9, 2008, five months after his arrest, 44 people linked to the Licciardi clan were apprehended in a raid by the Naples police. They were accused of conspiracy to commit murder, drug trafficking, possession of weapons, forgery, and attempted aggravated robbery. Vincenzo Licciardi, already in prison at the time, was also charged with these crimes. The raid was carried out following investigations that had led to Licciardi’s arrest.

An anti-Camorra raid was also undertaken by the Guardia di Finanza in Naples and the surrounding town of Frosinone, who seized property, commercial companies, shares of stakes in companies, apartments, buildings, land, cars, motorcycles, with a total estimated value of 300 million euros. In the aftermath of the raids, the police implemented an order for remand in prison handed down by the prosecution of Naples, at the request of local anti-Mafia directorate, against Licciardi and several affiliated criminal organizations that control the drug trafficking and extortion rackets in North Naples.
