= Di Lauro =

Di Lauro or DiLauro is an Italian surname. Notable people with the surname include:

- Cosimo Di Lauro, Italian gangster of the Di Lauro clan
- Marco Di Lauro, Italian gangster of the Di Lauro clan
- Paolo Di Lauro, Italian gangster of the Di Lauro clan
- Christian DiLauro, American football player
- Jack DiLauro (1943–2024), American baseball player

== See also ==
- Pago del Vallo di Lauro, town in Campania, Italy
