= Raffaele Imperiale =

Italian criminal

- Born: 24 October 1974 (age 51); Castellammare di Stabia, Italy
- Other name: Lelluccio Ferrarelle
- Occupations: Drug trafficker and Camorra's affiliate
- Status: Arrested in 2021
- Allegiance: Camorra
- Criminal charges: International drug trafficking

Raffaele Imperiale (born 24 October 1974) is an Italian criminal and a member of the Camorra. He is considered by authorities to be one of the most important drug traffickers affiliated with the Camorra. He was on the list of the most wanted fugitives in Italy until his arrest on 4 August 2021 in Dubai. In December 2022 it was noticed that Imperiale had become a "pentito", starting crown witness procedure.

== Biography ==
Imperiale was born in Castellammare di Stabia, a seaside resort just south of Naples, Italy. His father, Ludovico Imperiale, who died at the age of 82 on 16 July 2022, was a wealthy and well-known construction contractor of Castellammare di Stabia who built parks and buildings in the area and who served as the president and part owner of the city's football team, S.S. Juve Stabia. In his childhood, Imperiale was the victim of an attempted kidnapping, but managed to escape and return home safely. It has always been a mystery how he managed to escape. He had an older brother who died in 1996 and bequeathed him the Rockland coffeeshop in Amsterdam from where Imperiale began his notorious criminal career. In his coffeeshop Imperiale sold soft drugs and was involved in largescale cocaine trafficking with the Dutch drug trader Rick van de Bunt.

In the 1990s he was introduced by Antonio Orefice, member of the Moccia clan, to Elio Amato, brother of Raffaele Amato, at the time one of the top drug traffickers of the Di Lauro clan. During those years Imperiale began to earn millions of euros, becoming the referent of the Di Lauro's organization who dealt directly with the drug trafficking cartels in Peru, Ecuador and Colombia.

During the split of the Scissionisti di Secondigliano from the Di Lauro clan, Imperiale decided to ally with the Scissionisti, a position that he maintains to this day. In fact, during the Scampia feud, Imperiale supplied the Amato-Pagano clan with weapons. Yet, according to the pentito Antonio Leonardi, Imperiale was not a broker who acted independently, but, a full member of the Amato-Pagano. According to the authorities, while living in Dubai, Imperiale spent €400,000 a month to maintain his lavish lifestyle. In fact, after his arrest, it was revealed by the authorities that he had spent 7 million euros in just three months while on run, with the majority of expenses declared as "personal expenses".

In 2016, two stolen Van Gogh paintings from the Van Gogh Museum in Amsterdam in 2002, Congregation Leaving the Reformed Church in Nuenen and View of the Sea at Scheveningen, were recovered in a villa in Castellammare di Stabia, owned by him.

Documents sent by the United States Drug Enforcement Administration (DEA) to the Dutch police exposed what would be a super drug cartel headed by Raffaele Imperiale, Ridouan Taghi (Dutch former most-wanted criminal, now in jail), Daniel Kinahan (Irish reputed gang boss) and Edin Gačanin (Bosnian drug trafficker). The group was observed by the DEA having meetings in the Burj Al Arab hotel in Dubai, Imperiale's alleged operating base. The meetings took place in 2017, however, it only reached the Dutch media in October 2019. The DEA regards this as one of the world's fifty largest drug cartels, with a virtual monopoly on the Peruvian cocaine trade and would control around a third of the cocaine trade in Europe. Yet, according to the DEA documents, the destination for all the drugs shipments would be the Dutch ports.
