= Patrizio Bosti =

Italian Camorra boss and head of the Secondigliano Alliance

- Mugshot of Patrizio Bosti taken in 1998.
- Born: 5 September 1959 (age 67); Naples, Italy
- Other name: 'o Patrizio
- Occupations: Head of the Secondigliano Alliance and one of the current heads of the Contini clan
- Spouse: Rita Aieta
- Children: Ettore Bosti
- Status: Imprisoned since 2020
- Criminal charges: Extortion, murder and other crimes, all crimes with the mafia aggravating.

Patrizio Bosti (Italian pronunciation: [paˈtrittsjo ˈbɔsti]; born 5 September 1959, in Naples) is a powerful Italian Camorra boss and current head of the Secondigliano Alliance, a Camorra crime syndicate based in the city of Naples.

== History ==
His nickname is 'o Patrizio. Bosti and his clan are aligned with the long established Licciardi and Contini Camorra clans. The power, influence and wealth his clan held allowed Bosti to become one of the top Camorra leaders within the Secondigliano Alliance (Alleanza di Secondigliano) of leading Naples area clans.

Bosti was included on the list of most wanted fugitives in Italy and had been a fugitive from 2005, but was eventually arrested on 10 August 2008, in Girona, Spain. He was spotted when he took a flight from Naples to Barcelona a week before and traced to nearby Girona, where he was spending some time in a luxurious villa. Bosti was convicted in absentia of heading a clan of the Naples-based Camorra crime syndicate and sentenced to 23 years in prison for the murder of two rival mobsters during a feud in 1984. He was later extradited to Italy to face the murder charges.

Patrizio Bosti is married to Rita Aieta, sister in law of Edoardo Contini and Francesco Mallardo. According to some reports, in the 1980s and 1990s, he was the lover of Erminia Giuliano, sister of Luigi Giuliano, then boss of one of the most powerful Camorra clans of the time.

Bosti is the father of Ettore Bosti, called o'russ, who is also in jail. O'russ was known for his expensive lifestyle, often partying in exclusive nightclubs, spending large amounts of money and always being in the company of football players and influential people. Ettore is also known to have laundered money several times in the island of Ibiza, Spain.

In December 2019, Patrizio's wife, Rita Aieta, was moved to the 41-bis prison regime, giving another hard blow to the Secondigliano Alliance.

== Release and rearrest ==
In May 2020 Patrizio Bosti was released from prison. Bosti also claimed inhumane treatment while in prison, and will be compensated by the Italian State. The Camorra boss, that was serving a prison sentence since his arrest in Spain in 2008, should have been released from prison in 2023, however he was charged for three years and the halfway between early release and the time calculated as credit for the "inhuman treatment". According to the investigations, Bosti would have returned to live in Naples, in the Rione Amicizia area, his historical stronghold. On 16 May 2020 Bosti was arrested again. The new prison order concerned a recalculation of the sentence by the Emilia-Romagna judiciary, as he was serving his sentence in the region, on the basis of documents provided by the Naples Public Prosecutor. According to the authorities, Bosti had to serve another six years in jail.

== See also ==
- Camorra
- Edoardo Contini
- List of members of the Camorra
- Contini clan
- List of Camorra clans
- Licciardi clan
- Mallardo clan
- Secondigliano Alliance
