= Ketty Gabriele =

Italian criminal

Ketty Gabriele (born 10 July 1981 in Naples) is a reputed Italian mafia figure. Gabriele, a femminiello and member of the Camorra, was reported as the first transgender mafia figure following an arrest by Naples police in February 2009. According to authorities, Gabriele is a small-time capo behind a drug and prostitution ring for the Scissionisti di Secondigliano.

She pushed large quantities of drugs for Camorra boss Paolo Di Lauro, but since Di Lauro's arrest and the so-called Scampia feud between Camorra gangs, she did not need to answer to anyone anymore. Her elder brother, Salvatore Gabriele, is one of the Camorristi that graduated to become a boss. He wanted to extend his activities traveling the up and down Italy, supplying large- and small-scale dealers, and left her to run things at Scampia.

Gabriele fits in a long tradition of femminiello culture in Naples. Generally femminielli are considered good luck, for instance in gambling.
