= Lo Russo =

Lo Russo is an Italian surname. Notable people with the surname include:

- The Lo Russo clan, a Neapolitan Camorra clan
  - Salvatore Lo Russo (born 1953), member of the Camorra
- Michele Lo Russo (1947–1983), Italian footballer
- Stefano Lo Russo (born 1975), Italian politician and geologist

== See also ==
- Lorusso. surname
