= Francesco Mallardo =

Italian criminal (1951–2025)

- Born: 1 April 1951; Giugliano in Campania, Italy
- Died: 29 May 2025 (aged 74); Parma, Italy
- Other name: "Ciccio 'e Calantonio"
- Occupations: Founder of the Mallardo clan and one of the founders of the Secondigliano Alliance
- Allegiance: Mallardo clan / Camorra

Francesco Mallardo (Italian pronunciation: [franˈtʃesko malˈlardo]; 1 April 1951 – 29 May 2025), also known as Ciccio 'e Carlantonio, was an Italian criminal and a member of the Neapolitan Camorra. He headed the Mallardo clan operating from the town of Giugliano in Campania, north of the city of Naples. He was added to the list of thirty most dangerous fugitives in Italy.

== Biography ==
Francesco Mallardo, known in the criminal underworld as "Ciccio ‘e Carlantonio," was born and raised in Giugliano in Campania, a town in the metropolitan area of Naples. His entry into organized crime was shaped early on by a traumatic event: on August 2, 1967, when he was still a teenager, his father Domenico Mallardo, a small-time cigarette smuggler, was murdered outside their home near Piazza Annunziata. The ambush, carried out with a sawn-off shotgun, was later attributed to one of the sons of local boss Alfredo Maisto and his associates, including Corrado Iacolare, a notorious figure within Raffaele Cutolo’s Nuova Camorra Organizzata. The killing marked a turning point in Francesco's life. In the aftermath, he began engaging in petty crimes, progressing quickly to armed robbery and prostitution rackets. While his younger brother Giuseppe initially attempted to follow a legitimate path as an upholsterer, he too would eventually join the criminal operations led by Francesco.

In the early 1970s, Francesco found limited room for expansion in Giugliano and began establishing his presence in the city of Naples. He frequented the Vasto and Arenaccia neighborhoods, where he forged critical alliances with emerging crime figures Edoardo Contini and Patrizio Bosti. These relationships were strengthened by family ties, as all three men married sisters from the Aieta family. Francesco also formed a close bond with Gennaro Licciardi from Secondigliano, known as "Gennarino ‘a Scigna," a partnership that would later prove foundational. At the same time, he connected with Francesco Bidognetti, then a young criminal from Casal di Principe who specialized in prostitution rings. Bidognetti would become a loyal and violent enforcer for what would soon be known as the Mallardo clan. Alongside his brother Peppe and cousins Feliciano Mallardo and Giuseppe Dell'Aquila (known as "Peppe ‘o Ciuccio"), Francesco founded the clan that would eventually dominate the Giugliano area.

The real consolidation of his power began after the death of Alfredo Maisto in 1976. When Alfredo’s son Luigi assumed leadership of the Maisto clan, Francesco saw an opportunity. On October 22, 1978, he orchestrated an ambush in Piazza Matteotti, Giugliano, which resulted in the assassination of Luigi Maisto. The killing ignited a violent feud between the Mallardos and the Maistos, paralleling the broader war between the Nuova Famiglia, of which Francesco was a founding member, and the Nuova Camorra Organizzata. Throughout the 1980s, Francesco’s name became associated with numerous criminal enterprises and a ruthless campaign of violence. One of the most notorious incidents occurred in 1980, when an attempt to assassinate Bidognetti failed and instead caused the death of an innocent bystander, Filomena Morlando. Despite the bloodshed, Francesco expanded his operations to include illegal construction, extortion, and toxic waste trafficking, carving out control over local revenue streams and territory. In 1987, Francesco eliminated the last remnants of the Maisto clan by luring Antonio Maisto, Luigi’s brother, and two affiliates into a trap in Villa Literno, where they were murdered and their bodies set on fire. From that moment, the Mallardo clan was the uncontested power in Giugliano. Francesco then turned inward, purging the organization of rival factions, including the powerful D’Alterio brothers in 1991, who had once served as armed enforcers for the clan.

With his dominance now absolute, Francesco played a key role in the creation of the Secondigliano Alliance, a coalition of three powerful Neapolitan clans: the Mallardos, the Contini clan, and the Licciardi clan. This alliance became one of the most structured and influential criminal organizations in Southern Italy. In 1992, Francesco Mallardo was arrested during a coordinated police operation. While his ally Gennaro Licciardi would die a few years later in prison following complications from surgery, Francesco managed to escape from a hospital in Giugliano, where he had been held for health-related treatment. He returned to clandestine activity and continued directing his criminal empire, despite frequent clashes with law enforcement.

=== Arrest ===
On 14 April 2000, he was arrested in a country house between Qualiano and Giugliano while attending a meeting of the so-called Secondigliano Alliance. Among the 13 people arrested were Patrizio Bosti and Feliciano Mallardo. They tried to escape but were blocked by the police.

Francesco Mallardo had a heart condition and suffered a heart attack in the maximum security prison in Parma. He escaped from custody from two hospitals, one in his hometown Giugliano, and from a clinic in Pinerolo, near Turin. He was arrested again on 29 August 2003. The police, who had been on his trail, discovered Mallardo's car on the A30 near Nola and set up a road block. Mallardo, who was returning from a vacation with his family, pretended to stop but then suddenly accelerated, slightly injuring two policemen. Police then fired a few shots and hit a car tire. After a few hundred metres the car came to a standstill.

=== Death ===
Mallardo died in palliative care from a terminal illness while serving a 30-year prison sentence, on 29 May 2025, at the age of 74.
