= Giuseppe Dell'Aquila =

Italian criminal (born 1962)

Giuseppe Dell'Aquila (Italian pronunciation: [dʒuˈzɛppe delˈlaːkwila]; born March 20, 1962, in Giugliano in Campania), nicknamed Peppe 'o ciuccio ("Joe the Jackass"), is an Italian criminal and a member of the Neapolitan Camorra.

== Biography ==
He was a fugitive since 2002 wanted for Mafia association, robbery, fencing, money laundering and other crimes. He was put on Italy's most wanted list in March 2011. On May 25, 2011, the Italian police arrested him in a villa in Varcaturo, 19 miles northwest of Napoli.

He was allied with the Mallardo clan and Contini clan and one of the leaders of the Secondigliano Alliance (Alleanza di Secondigliano), a coalition of powerful Camorra clans which controls drug trafficking and the extortion rackets in many suburbs of Naples that was formed at the end of the 1980s and controlled much of Naples for ten years.

He worked in the shadows, according to several Camorra turncoats. The pentito Salvatore Giuliano said Dell’Aquila was the armed wing of the Contini and Mallardo clans. "He is a ferocious killer of Mallardo, on behalf of whom he committed a hundred murders," according to Giuliano. He has not been charged with any homicide, however. He is active as a money launderer for the proceeds of drug trafficking and extortion.
