= Gelsomina Verde =

Italian murder victim

- Born: 5 December 1982
- Died: 21 November 2004 (aged 21); Naples, Italy
- Cause of death: Homicide
- Known for: Victim of Di Lauro clan

Gelsomina Verde (Italian pronunciation: [dʒelsoˈmiːna ˈverde]; 5 December 1982 – 21 November 2004) was a victim of the Camorra who was tortured and subsequently murdered during the Scampia feud in the city of Naples on 21 November 2004, aged 21.

== Murder ==
Verde, a leather factory worker, was abducted and tortured by members of the Di Lauro clan, in an effort to make her disclose the whereabouts of her former boyfriend, a Scissionisti clan member, Gennaro Notturno. Gelsomina and Gennaro had broken up weeks prior to her abduction.

An autopsy conducted on her corpse revealed that she had been killed with three shots to the neck after enduring hours of torture. The killers then set her body on fire inside her car, in order to hide the torture she had suffered and not to cause public commotion after her death.

== Aftermath ==
=== Public reaction ===
Verde's death caused widespread public revulsion and led to a major crackdown by the authorities. The president of the Campania region (of which Naples is the capital) Antonio Bassolino said: "This challenge must be met and the state must pay attention." Two days later, Home Minister Giuseppe Pisanu dispatched 325 extra police officers to the city which already had a higher ratio of police to people than any other in the country. This contributed to the end of the feud in September 2005.

=== Trial ===
Verde's family was a civil party in criminal proceedings that ended on 4 April 2006. It resulted in the life imprisonment of Ugo De Lucia, considered to be one of the most brutal killers in the Di Lauro clan. Another Di Lauro clan member, Pietro Esposito who testified against his former cohorts, received a prison term of seven years and four months for his involvement in the murder.

On 13 December 2008, Cosimo Di Lauro, was sentenced to life imprisonment for ordering the murder of Gelsomina Verde. Di Lauro died in prison on June 13, 2022. An autopsy was ordered.

== Legacy ==
Verde is mentioned in the 2006 book Gomorrah by Roberto Saviano, while she is also the inspiration behind a character named Manu (played by Denise Perna) in the television series of the same name, who appears in the ninth episode entitled "Gelsomina Verde".
