= Licciardi =

Licciardi is an Italian surname. Notable people with the surname include:

- Maria Licciardi (born 1951), Italian gangster of the Licciardi clan
- Vincenzo Licciardi (born 1965), Italian gangster
- Vinny Licciardi, viral protagonist
