= Cesare Pagano =

Italian Camorrista (born 1969)

- Mug shot of Cesare Pagano
- Born: October 22, 1969 (age 56); Naples, Italy
- Other name: Cesarino
- Allegiance: Di Lauro clan (until 2002), Amato-Pagano clan / Camorra

Cesare Pagano (Italian pronunciation: [ˈtʃeːzare paˈɡaːno, ˈtʃɛː-]; born October 22, 1969) is an Italian Camorrista. Until his arrest in July 2010, he had been on the "most wanted list" of the Italian ministry of the Interior since March 2009, for Camorra association, international drug trafficking and other crimes.

Pagano is one of the leaders of Scissionisti di Secondigliano with his brother-in-law Raffaele Amato. The Amato-Pagano clan started a war, known as the Scampia feud, with the Di Lauro clan to take over the control of main drug-dealing turf in the Naples area that resulted in the deaths of around 70 people between 2004 and 2005.

== Arrest ==
On July 8, 2010, Pagano and two other men – including his fugitive nephew Carmine Pagano – were arrested in a beach villa in Licola near the town of Pozzuoli, on the northern shoreline of the sprawling southern Italian city of Naples. They put up no resistance after police surrounded a house where they were hiding and fired warning shots.

He is now serving a life sentence.
