= Lo Russo clan =

Neapolitan Camorra (organised crime) clan

- Founded: Late 1970s
- Founders: Brothers: Salvatore Lo Russo, Mario Lo Russo, Giuseppe Lo Russo and Carlo Lo Russo
- Founding location: Miano, Naples
- Years active: 1970s – 2016
- Territory: Neighbourhoods in the North of Naples, Italy; Lugano, Switzerland; Nice, France
- Criminal activities: Drug trafficking money laundering, prostitution, extortion, bribery,
- Allies: Scissionisti di Secondigliano; Vastarella clan Piccirillo clan and formerly Secondigliano Alliance
- Rivals: Licciardi clan Esposito-Genidoni clan

The Lo Russo clan was a Neapolitan Camorra clan operating on its territory within the city of Naples, concentrated specifically in the area of Miano, whose control extended throughout numerous neighborhoods in the north of the city for more than three decades. Since the fall of all the Lo Russo brothers, and the numerous arrests of most of its affiliates, the organization is considered overthrown.

== History ==
The Lo Russo clan was formed in the late seventies by the Lo Russo brothers, Salvatore, Giuseppe, Mario and Carlo Lo Russo aka "i Capitoni" (The Captains).

After its formation, it immediately merged into the Nuova Famiglia (NF), a federation of Anti-Cutolo Camorra clans consisting of Michele Zaza (a Camorra boss with strong ties with Cosa Nostra), the Gionta clan from Torre Annunziata, the Nuvoletta clan from Marano, Antonio Bardellino from San Cipriano d'Aversa and Casal di Principe, the Alfieri clan led by Carmine Alfieri, the Galasso clan of Poggiomarino led by Pasquale Galasso, the Giuliano clan from Naples' quarter Forcella led by Luigi Giuliano and the Vollaro clan from Portici led by Luigi Vollaro. It was formed to contrast the growing power of Raffaele Cutolo's Nuova Camorra Organizzata (NCO).

The war against the NCO resulted in the victory of the Lo Russo's and other NF clans. However, the NF alliance soon disintegrated into many feuding clans, with a war breaking out between the Casalesi and Nuvoletta clans towards the end of 1983. After the end of the NF alliance, the Lo Russo clan joined the newly formed Secondigliano Alliance), a coalition of powerful Camorra clans which controls drug trafficking and the extortion rackets in many suburbs of Naples.

During the Scampia feud, the Lo Russo clan had a role as an intermediary between the Di Lauro clan and the so-called "secessionists" (Italian "scissionisti"), a breakaway fraction from the Di Lauro clan in the northern suburbs of Naples that tried to assert its control over drugs and prostitution rackets in the area. The Lo Russo clan, for its good organization, also had a leading role in a conflict with the Stabile, both in the Rione Sanità, where Salvatore Torino has created a division within the Misso clan.

== Arrests and seizures ==
In August 2007, the boss Salvatore Lo Russo was arrested by the carabinieri in his home at Capodimonte, together with his protégé Rafaelle Perfetto. The carabinieri executed an order of custody issued by the District Anti-Mafia Directorate Parthenopean for conspiracy to commit murder and other Camorra-type crimes.

On 15 April 2014, the new boss Antonio Lo Russo and his cousin Carlo Lo Russo were arrested by agents of National Gendarmerie Section de Recherches and by Carabinieri while quietly in a bar in Nice. According to the then Minister of the Interior of France, Bernard Cazeneuve, the arrest of Lo Russo was a hard blow for the organized crime in the country.

In 2017, assets worth 20 million euros belonging to the Potenza brothers, who are considered to be linked to the Lo Russo clan, were seized in Lugano, including bank accounts in BSI.

== Decline ==
According to the investigators, the last Lo Russo to command the powerful organization was Carlo Lo Russo. After the arrest of the boss in 2016 and his decision to become a pentito, the clan who controlled a vast territory in the north of Naples for over 40 years, was dismantled.

By 2019, the Lo Russo clan no longer exists as an organization and would be fragmented into small groups led by former employees or members of the former clan, such as the Nappello and Perfetto factions, without obeying any kind of guideline.

In February 2020, the Italian police arrested 32 members of a new group, known in the media as the "Lo Russo heirs". According to the investigations, this new group is involved in the clash for succession after the disintegration of the Lo Russo clan.

== See also ==
- Camorra
- List of members of the Camorra
- Secondigliano Alliance
- Licciardi clan
- Salvatore Lo Russo
