= Maria Licciardi =

Italian criminal

- Police mugshot of Maria Licciardi, taken after her arrest on 14 June 2001
- Born: 24 March 1951 (age 75); Secondigliano, Naples, Italy
- Other names: La Madrina ("The Godmother"); La Piccolina ("The Little Girl"); La Piccerella ("Little Girl")
- Occupation: Head of the Licciardi Clan
- Spouse: Antonio Techemie
- Children: 1
- Relatives: Vincenzo Licciardi (brother); Gennaro Licciardi (brother)
- Status: Arrested in 2021
- Criminal charges: Murder, drug trafficking, extortion

Maria Licciardi (Italian pronunciation: [maˈriːa litˈtʃardi]; born 24 March 1951) is an Italian criminal affiliated with the Camorra, head of the Licciardi clan, and one of the bosses of the Secondigliano Alliance. She was one of the most powerful bosses of the Camorra in the city of Naples from 1993 until her arrest in 2001.

Licciardi was referred to as La Madrina ("The Godmother") by fellow Camorristi and earned the nickname La Piccolina ("The Little Girl") early on in her criminal career, due to her diminutive height. Among Camorra women she is known respectfully as La Principessa ("The Princess"), due to her good standing.

== Camorra heritage ==
Licciardi was born and raised in the Neapolitan suburb of Secondigliano, a traditional stronghold of the Licciardi clan. Her entire family belonged to the Camorra. Her father was a well-known guappo or local boss. One of her brothers, Gennaro Licciardi known as "'a Scigna" (The Monkey) was a very powerful guappo, who later became the head of the clan and a founding member of the Secondigliano Alliance (Italian: Alleanza di Secondigliano), a coalition of powerful Camorra clans which controlled drug trafficking and the extortion rackets in many suburbs of Naples. Gennaro died from blood poisoning while in the Voghera prison on 3 August 1994. Licciardi's husband, Antonio Teghemié was also in the Camorra.

== Reign as boss ==
Licciardi rose to power and took over as head of the clan after her two brothers, Pietro and Vincenzo, and her husband were arrested. She was the first female Camorrista to become the boss of the Licciardi clan and take over as head of the Secondigliano Alliance. The death of Gennaro Licciardi caused some disruption in the local underworld, as well as several bloody attempts to seize control, but the clan was kept in stable condition by Maria. She brought together a fragile informal coalition of twenty Camorra clans in order to expand control of the city's most lucrative rackets, from drugs and cigarette smuggling to protection and prostitution. She also played a key role in expanding the city's drug trade market. Under her leadership, the Secondigliano Alliance became more organized, secretive, sophisticated and consequently more powerful.

Licciardi introduced many revolutionary changes to the clan. Perhaps the most important among them was the involvement in the prostitution trade. Prior to this, the Camorra had a code of conduct that forbade them from making money from prostitution. However, under Licciardi, this code was broken. The Camorra would buy the girls from the Albanian mafia for US$2,000. Many of them came on the promise of legitimate work in order to escape the crushing poverty of their homeland, but once they arrived, they were practically enslaved and forced into prostitution by the Camorra. Many such girls were underage. They were often put on drugs. This helped increase criminal activity, as they usually spent a large part of their income purchasing narcotics for consumption.

== Personality ==
Unlike many male Camorristi, Licciardi shunned the limelight and was never convicted or even suspected of any crime. One well-connected insider described her as radiating a steely charisma. According to police sources, she was reputed to be practical, charming, exceptionally intelligent, but just as ruthless as her male counterparts. She carried a cold and calculating approach in her criminal endeavors, reportedly taking her inspiration from Rosetta Cutolo, sister of Raffaele Cutolo, the boss of the Nuova Camorra Organizzata.

Under her, the Licciardi clan generated a great amount of goodwill among the local populace as it continued the old habit of giving an occasional handout to the neighborhood's poor. In Secondigliano, with no social security benefits provided to the people by the local government and an endemic unemployment rate, the clan provided the neighbourhood with a principal source of employment.

When the pentito Gaetano Guida was asked in court about the role of Maria Licciardi and women in the Secondigliano Alliance, he replied:

"They are on the front line. It has always been like this in the Secondigliano clan, in the sense that women (wives, sisters and mothers of the leaders) have always had an influential role in many decisions. Maria Licciardi, Gennaro's sister, is representative of this. She took orders to and from her brother: she transmitted his orders and messages, even those of major importance. On more than one occasion, she transported his orders to kill. I don't recall the details, but I know that for our clan, talking with Maria Licciardi was the same as talking with Gennaro, the boss. I can add that the Secondigliano women took on all sorts of jobs on behalf of the alliance, they took messages to prisoners, distributed money to members, and organized activities, especially numbers running and extortion rackets. In other words, they constitute the backbone of the organization."

Lucia Licciardi, no relation to Maria, was the only journalist to get access to her inner circle. In an interview, she described her management style as follows: "She behaves just like the manager of a multinational. She always looks for a solution that's less likely to attract police attention and that creates fewer splits within the clan." On Maria Licciardi, Judge Luigi Bobbio stated that: "The moment a woman takes charge of the organisation, paradoxically, we witness a lowering of the emotional level and a better performance of the group's activities."

== Bribing pentiti ==
Maria Licciardi sought to control the possible effects of the testimonies of many pentiti in order to protect the clan. For instance, Italian police discovered that a few days after his escape from his protected location, pentito Constantino Saro met Licciardi in order to ask for money in return for retracting statements on the clan's activities. The Secondigliano Alliance was divided over this issue. Some wanted to pay him, while others wanted to pay him and then murder him and his family.

In January 1998, Maria Licciardi was stopped in a car with her sister, Assunta, and her sister-in-law with around 300 million lire, which the prosecutors believe was her purported payment to him. She refused to disclose as to what the money was for and she faded into obscurity immediately after lawyers secured her release.

== Downfall ==
The reign of Maria Licciardi ran smoothly for many years until a disagreement arose over a consignment of pure, unrefined heroin. In the spring of 1999, a large consignment of heroin arrived from Istanbul, Turkey. Licciardi decreed it should not be sold, as it was too pure and strong for the average user and would thus kill those who purchased it, harming the alliance's large customer base of drug users. However, the Lo Russo clan, who had always chafed under her leadership, disagreed and packaged the shipment for sale on the street. The sale of the packets of unrefined heroin resulted in the deaths of many drug addicts across Naples, eleven of whom died in April 1999 alone. This caused great public outrage and resulted in massive police crackdowns on the Camorra clans. Many Camorristi were arrested and subsequently imprisoned.

The Lo Russo clan eventually split from the alliance, leading to disintegration and a bloody gang war, including the use of car bombs and bazooka attacks. Clans began fighting over turf, and attempted to destroy or take other clan's business. When four clan members were murdered in her stronghold of Secondigliano, Licciardi was forced to retaliate. She mobilised her footsoldiers for an all-out counterattack. The deadly gang wars resulted in nearly 120 deaths in Naples and the surrounding region. It was around this time that investigators became aware of Licciardi's existence.

== Fugitive ==
Licciardi was added on the "30 most wanted Italians" list and went into hiding. Thanks to a sophisticated network of protection set up by her clan, Licciardi was able to evade capture for two years and, despite having changed her refuge several times, never left the Masseria Cardone district. While on the lam, she continued as the undisputed boss of the Licciardi clan and ordered several murders of rival mobsters. She went to war with the Giuliano clan of Forcella, which was headed by another female Camorra boss Erminia Giuliano, who took control after the arrest of her brother, Luigi Giuliano.

When the senior prosecutor Luigi Bobbio began making successful prosecutions against her clan, Licciardi felt that he was getting closer to discovering her whereabouts. In January 2001, she bombed Bobbio's office building. The bombing was delivered as a warning to stop the investigation of her clan's activities and also to stop any further prosecution of her clan members. However, the bombing did not stop Bobbio from continuing his investigations. On the contrary, he was put under police protection and continued his prosecutions against the clan undeterred. Over 70 members of the Licciardi clan were arrested. They refused to cooperate with prosecutors and served their prison sentences.

The police made many fruitless efforts to catch Licciardi. In April 2000, the Carabinieri arrested 13 Camorra bosses who were holding a summit around a table in a rural farmhouse between the districts of Qualiano and Giugliano. The group was allegedly discussing how to invest its funds in a network of furniture and children's clothing stores. However, Licciardi was not among them.

On 9 June 2001, several hundred heavily armed officers, backed by helicopter spotters, launched an intensive search operation in and around Secondigliano. Acting on a tip-off, they stormed a dilapidated building that she had been known to use as a hide-out. Licciardi was nowhere to be found, but police discovered that inside an attic guarded by surveillance cameras she had installed marble floors, a grand piano and an outsize Jacuzzi. Her repeated successes in evading capture by the police inspired local journalists to dub her "The Scarlet Pimpernel of Italy".

== 2001 arrest and imprisonment ==
On 14 June 2001, Licciardi was arrested by the Naples police while traveling with a married couple in a car around Melito, near Naples. She did not resist arrest and was ultimately sentenced to prison. The man accused of aiding her was arrested as well, whereas his wife was released due to her being the mother of a child. After her arrest, police noticed she looked just like the popular mugshot of her that was released years earlier. After her arrest, her brother Vincenzo Licciardi took over as the head of the clan. Vincenzo was himself eventually arrested on 7 February 2008, after having been included on the list of most wanted fugitives in Italy since 2004.

== 2009 release ==
Although in prison, she still commanded the clan. Prisons do not represent a barrier for the Camorra, according to Anna Maria Zaccaria, a sociologist at the University of Naples Federico II researching the role of women in the syndicate. In 2009, Licciardi was released from prison after almost 8 years.

== 2021 arrest ==
On 26 June 2019, Licciardi managed to escape from a huge anti-Camorra operation against the Secondigliano Alliance, becoming a fugitive.

On 12 July 2019, the Court of Naples annulled the preventive detention order against Licciardi, sharing the legal questions raised by her lawyer, Dario Vannetiello. Licciardi was considered a free woman, despite her known role as the head of the Secondigliano Alliance, one of the most powerful criminal organization in the Campania region.

She was arrested again at Rome's Ciampino airport by Carabinieri on the orders of Naples prosecutors, alleged to have been running extortion rackets as head of the Licciardi Camorra clan, on 7 August 2021 when attempting to travel to Spain.
