= Pasquale Russo =

- Mug shot of Pasquale Russo
- Born: 28 February 1947 (age 79); San Paolo Bel Sito, Italy
- Occupation: Head of the Russo clan
- Children: Antonio Russo
- Status: In prison since 2009
- Allegiance: Russo clan / Camorra
- Criminal charges: Murder, drug trafficking
- Penalty: Life in prison

Pasquale Russo (Italian pronunciation: [paˈskwaːle ˈrusso]; born 28 February 1947) is an Italian Camorrista and boss of the Russo clan from Nola, which he co-founded. He has been running the clan together with his brother Salvatore for over thirty years. He has been on the "most wanted list" of the Italian Ministry of the Interior since 1995, for Camorra association, murder, concealment of corpse, multiple homicides, racketeering and other crimes. On 15 February 1996, an international warrant was issued against him, to be arrested for extradition.

== Criminal career ==
Pasquale Russo and his brother, Salvatore, began their criminal careers in the mid-1970s under Carmine Alfieri but later switched allegiance to Mario Fabbrocino, a powerful figure in San Gennaro Vesuviano. Fabbrocino, in turn, was connected to Michele Zaza, a leading figure in the cigarette contraband industry during that period. Within the Fabbrocino clan, Pasquale was promoted to "sottocapo" on the recommendation of Salvatore Zaza, Michele Zaza’s brother, reflecting his growing influence. However, tensions soon arose. Fabbrocino distanced himself from Zaza, blaming him for failing to adequately oppose Raffaele Cutolo’s Nuova Camorra Organizzata, while his increasingly grandiose and reckless behaviour created friction. Pasquale grew concerned for the safety of their associates, especially after the murder of Pasquale’s friend Giuseppe Muollo by the rival D'Alessandro clan. Viewing Fabbrocino as a danger to their lives and operations, the brothers decided to break away.

For a short period, Pasquale and Salvatore acted independently, focusing primarily on extortion. By 1985, they began gradually reintegrating into Carmine Alfieri’s organization, as the Alfieri clan expanded its power in Campania following the near-conclusion of the war against the Cutoliani. At the time, the Alfieri clan was considered the most powerful group within the Camorra.

After the arrest of Carmine Alfieri in 1992, Pasquale and Salvatore Russo inherited part of his criminal empire, which became known as the Russo clan. According to police reports, the Russo brothers became two of the wealthiest criminals in Campania, with Pasquale known for his strategic intelligence and Salvatore for his ruthlessness. For years, they successfully evaded capture thanks to their wealth and an extensive network of contacts, ranging from petty criminals to professionals, and including connections to institutions and the Cosa Nostra.

According to reports, the Russo clan grew into a fully independent clan, capable of controlling territory and generating significant revenue. Their structure and methods mirrored those of the Sicilian Mafia: highly hierarchical, with centralized leadership and sophisticated management of both illicit and legitimate businesses. The clan also used advanced security and surveillance technology, showing a modern approach to maintaining power and avoiding law enforcement.

== Arrest ==
He was arrested on 1 November 2009, in Sperone (Avellino) together with his younger brother Carmine Russo, a fugitive since 2007 and on the list of 100 most wanted fugitives. His brother Salvatore had been arrested the day before. He is now serving several life sentences.

=== Aftermath ===
After Pasquale's arrest, the Italian police also arrested the businessman Andrea Grandi, accused of hosting Russo for months in one of his houses. However, when questioned in the courtroom, the boss said that he did not know the businessman.

In May 2019, Antonio Russo, Pasquale's son, was arrested. He is accused of extortion.

== See also ==
- List of members of the Camorra
- List of Camorra clans
- Russo clan (Nola)
- Salvatore Russo
- Camorra
- List of most wanted fugitives in Italy
- Alfieri clan
