= Gennaro Licciardi =

Italian Camorrista

- Born: 30 November 1956; Secondigliano, Italy
- Died: 3 August 1994 (aged 37); Voghera, Italy
- Other name: 'a scigna
- Occupations: Founder and head of the Licciardi clan and one of the founders of the Secondigliano Alliance
- Relatives: Vincenzo Licciardi (brother); Maria Licciardi (sister)
- Allegiance: Licciardi clan / Camorra

Gennaro Licciardi (Secondigliano, 30 November 1956 – Voghera, 3 August 1994) was a powerful Italian Camorrista in the north region of Naples, founder of the Licciardi clan, and one of the founders of the Secondigliano Alliance.

== Biography ==
Licciardi, known as 'a scigna (the monkey) for his escapes from the balconies of the apartments in Secondigliano, started his criminal career in the 1970s, when the violent war between the Nuova Famiglia and the Nuova Camorra Organizzata was at its peak. In that time, Licciardi was the capozona, 'head person of the zone', of the Giuliano clan in the Secondigliano zone. In 1981, he ended up in jail together with his friend Gennaro Esposito, on charges of Camorra association, murder contest, illegal possession of weapons and shoot in a public place.

Since he was an affiliate of the Nuova Famiglia, the NCO tried to kill him, but failing, they killed his brother, Antonio Licciardi, who was only 22 years old, in the popular Don Guanella district. Licciardi would continue to suffer attacks on his life more numerous times over the years, and always managing to escape unscathed.

The downfall of the NCO of Cutolo soon led Licciardi to conquer an autonomous and predominant role in the Neapolitan criminal scene, founding the Licciardi clan, and in the early 1990s he was also considered the undisputed godfather of the northern suburbs of the city of Naples.

In 1992 he was captured, at a roadblock, and according to the investigations, he would be going to meet Francesco Mallardo in the countryside of Giugliano. Two years later, on 2 August 1994, Gennaro Licciardi died in the hospital of Voghera, where he had been urgently transferred for an intestinal infection.

After Gennaro's death, the clan's reins passed to his siblings Vincenzo and Maria Licciardi.

=== Secondigliano Alliance ===
Together with the boss Francesco Mallardo, of the Mallardo clan from Giugliano in Campania, and with the boss Edoardo Contini, of the Contini clan, Licciardi managed to found a maxi-criminal cartel called Secondigliano Alliance, which for years dominated almost the entire territory of Naples. The Alliance remained dominant even long after the death of Licciardi and the arrests of Contini and Mallardo, and in 2019 it was listed as the most powerful organization belonging to the Camorra.

== See also ==
- Licciardi clan
- Maria Licciardi
- Vincenzo Licciardi
- Secondigliano Alliance
- Camorra
- Giuliano clan
