= Mariano clan =

Criminal organization

- Founded: Mid-1980s
- Founded by: Ciro Mariano; Marco Mariano; Salvatore Mariano
- Founding location: Quartieri Spagnoli, Naples
- Years active: 1980s-present
- Territory: Mostly Quartieri Spagnoli and neighboring areas
- Criminal activities: Racketeering, fraud, smuggling, extortion, drug trafficking, money laundering
- Allies: Secondigliano Alliance; Contini clan; Licciardi clan; Mallardo clan; Giuliano clan

The Mariano clan is a Neapolitan Camorra clan operating in the Quartieri Spagnoli of Naples. The organization emerged as a dominant criminal force in the area during the mid-1980s under the leadership of the three Mariano brothers: Ciro, Marco and Salvatore.

== History ==
The Mariano clan's rise began in the mid-1980s, when the brothers Ciro, Marco and Salvatore Mariano established their control over the narrow streets of the Quartieri Spagnoli, an area overlooking Via Toledo and Piazza Trieste e Trento. The clan developed alliances with the Giuliano clan and later with the Licciardi and Contini clans. These relationships allowed the organization to consolidate its position while operating with limited interference from rival groups.

Control of the Quartieri Spagnoli provided the Marianos with access to commercial activities in nearby Chiaia, an affluent area of the city. The clan was involved in the storage and distribution of heroin and generated revenue through extortion and illegal gambling activities, including clandestine lottery operations and totonero. Part of these gambling proceeds was reportedly shared with criminal groups in Forcella and with the Secondigliano Alliance. The organization's growing income enabled it to acquire weapons and establish groups of armed enforcers. The clan also developed a system of financial assistance for imprisoned members, continuing to pay them and covering the legal fees of their lawyers. According to the investigations, this system was intended to discourage members from cooperating with the authorities.

Among the three brothers, Ciro Mariano emerged as the most prominent and charismatic figure. He is described as cultivating a strong personal image and enjoying a highly visible lifestyle in nightclubs and establishments in central Naples. A former member of the organization, Pasquale Frajese, later became a cooperating witness and described the influence Mariano exercised over his followers.

During the period of the clan's greatest influence, the Mariano clan developed a reputation for its armed groups and its ability to mobilize young people from the streets of Naples. The organization combined territorial control, extortion and drug trafficking with a system of loyalty intended to maintain cohesion among its members.

=== Expansion ===
By the middle of the 1990s, the power of the Mariano clan had expanded beyond the Quartieri Spagnoli. According to reports, the group exercised influence over across several areas of central and western Naples, including parts of Fuorigrotta. The expansion also created difficulties within the organization. Internal disagreements eventually resulted in a split led by Antonio Ranieri and Salvatore Cardillo, who accused the clan's leadership of failing to pay agreed amounts in connection with an arms transaction. The dispute represented one of the first major fractures within the organization.

=== Conflict with the Di Biase clan ===
A major turning point came with the conflict between the Mariano and the Di Biase clans, another criminal group originating in the Quartieri Spagnoli. According to reports, the conflict resulted in more than ten deaths and proved strategically disastrous for the Marianos. The succession of killings attracted the attention of the judicial authorities, who began investigating criminal activities taking place in the Quartieri Spagnoli. The investigation subsequently exposed the structure of the Mariano clan and led to numerous arrests.

=== Investigations and arrests ===
The investigation was led by prosecutor Federico Cafiero De Raho, who reconstructed the organizational structure of the group. The investigation was assisted by testimony from cooperating witness Carmela Palazzo, known as Cerasella. Her testimony contributed to the identification of members of the organization and to the arrests that followed. Ciro Mariano was arrested in a restaurant in Rome, where he was having lunch with businessmen from the capital. Judicial reports also described an alleged attempt by Mariano to acquire half of the Teatro Politeama through intermediaries, nominee holders and loans, for an amount of approximately 250 million Italian lire.

Over the following years, other members of the organization, including lieutenants, associates and Mariano's brothers Marco and Salvatore, were imprisoned. The convictions were subsequently upheld on appeal and by the Court of Cassation. These sentences prevented the clan from reorganizing itself as a unified organization.

=== Decline ===
By the end of the 1990s, the Mariano clan had lost its dominant position in the Quartieri Spagnoli. The disappearance of its leadership created a power vacuum that was subsequently contested by other criminal organizations. The area initially came under the influence of the Russo-Lepre alliance, which had developed through a marriage between the families of Ciro Lepre and Domenico Russo, known as Mimì dei cani. The alliance regarded Giuseppe Misso as its principal reference point. Later, other groups, including the Di Biase, Terracciano, and Ricci clans, became involved in the struggle for control of the area, with the Ricci clan receiving cooperation from the Sarno clan from Ponticelli.
