= Salvatore Lo Russo =

- Salvatore Lo Russo at his arrest on August 30, 2007.
- Born: February 18, 1953 (age 73); Naples, Italy
- Occupation: Former leader of the Lo Russo clan
- Children: Antonio Lo Russo
- Status: Pentito
- Allegiance: Lo Russo clan / Camorra
- Criminal charges: Mafia association

Salvatore Lo Russo (born February 18, 1953, in Naples) is a former member of the Camorra. Officially unemployed, Lo Russo was the head of the powerful Lo Russo clan, a Camorra clan, now defunct, that was based on its territory within the city of Naples, concentrated specifically in its stronghold of Miano. For over 30 years the Lo Russo's organization has extended its influence to numerous neighborhoods in the north of Naples, having branches in France and in Switzerland.

== Arrest ==
He was arrested on August 30, 2007, by the Carabinieri at his home in Miano. Prior to that, he was arrested during a raid on May 16, 2006, but released a few days later due to lack of evidence. On the same day of his arrest, Raffaele Perfetto, one of his closest aides was also arrested at his home in Capodimonte. Lo Russo was later held in detention by the Carabinieri and charged with conspiracy to murder rival Camorristi during the Scampia feud. Since 2010, Salvatore Lo Russo has decided to break omertà and become a pentito, helping investigators in bringing down his own clan, which however remained active until 2016, when, after the arrest of the last leader of the organization, Vincenzo Lo Russo, the Lo Russo's era was considered ended.

== Personal life ==
Salvatore's son, Antonio Lo Russo was also a top member of the clan in its heyday, according to a statement made by Lo Russo, he tried in every way to make his son stay out of the world of Camorra, and that encouraged his son to start a company or any business that was legal in another place, outside Naples, however, Antonio went against his father's wishes and ended up joining the family's lucrative business. Yet, according to Salvatore's declarations, he entrusted his son to a trusted man of the clan, in the sense of giving him the feeling to be operational without involving him much in the business. Eventually, Antonio Lo Russo was arrested in a bar in Nice, France and following his father's footsteps, became a collaborator of justice.

== Fall of the Lo Russo clan ==
Nowadays, the once powerful Lo Russo clan is considered just a reminder of the past for the inhabitants of the zones where it used to exercise a great dominance over everyone's lives. After the fall of the clan, its former affiliates formed new independent groups, known in the media as the "Lo Russo heirs", to control the zones once dominated by the Lo Russo organization. In February 2020 the Italian police arrested 32 members who belonged to these new groups.

== See also ==
- Lo Russo clan
- List of Camorra clans
- Camorra
