= Russo clan (Nola) =

Criminal organization

- Founded: 1980s
- Founded by: Pasquale Russo; Salvatore Russo
- Founding location: Nola, Italy
- Years active: 1980s-present
- Territory: Various towns in Campania, Italy
- Activities: Money laundering Drug trafficking Extortion; Political corruption
- Allies: Fabbrocino clan Alfieri clan (defunct); Cava clan: Sicilian Mafia; Corleonesi; Moccia clan Mazzarella clan Cesarano clan

The Russo clan is a Neapolitan Camorra clan operating in the town of Nola and its surrounding territories. Police say the Russo clan had total control over illegal activity in about 40 towns in the Naples region.

== History ==
The clan was headed by the brothers Pasquale and Salvatore Russo who founded the organization that has held control of Nola for over thirty years. The criminal career of the Russo brothers started in the 1970s and they had close ties to Mario Fabbrocino and Michele Zaza. The Russo brothers completely re-organised the operations of the clan-based crime syndicate since the 1990s. They were reputed to be ruthless criminals and created a significant network of alliances, particularly with the Alfieri and Cava clans. They have been in list of most wanted fugitives in Italy since 1995. In the past the clan was reportedly linked to the Corleonesi of the Sicilian Mafia. Over the years, the Russo clan has maintained good relations with numerous other clans, such as the Moccia clan from Afragola, the Fabbrocino clan from San Giuseppe Vesuviano and the Cesarano clan from Pompei. The Russo clan represented a real holding company to which a variety of illegal activities belonged to, becoming a multibillion-euro enterprise and one of the most feared clans in the entire province of Naples.

== Political connections ==
The Russos were very well connected in the politics of the region of Nola and surrounding cities, the clan supported its candidates to the Municipal Council of Nola, through its own affiliate, Franco Cutolo. The Russo family historical stronghold was the town San Paolo Bel Sito, which has been dissolved twice for Camorra infiltration.

== Arrests and seizures ==
Pasquale Russo, arrested in 2009

In March 2007, the clan was dealt a severe blow with the arrest of three members, including Salvatore's son, Francesco Russo. In March 2008, assets worth 300 million euros belonging to the Russo clan were seized by the Italian State, including real estate, two supermarkets, luxury cars, and Swiss bank accounts.

Salvatore Russo was arrested on October 31, 2009, in Somma Vesuviana, close to his native area Nola. Pasquale was arrested a day later, on November 1, 2009, in Sperone (Avellino) together with his younger brother Carmine Russo, a fugitive since 2007 and on the list of 100 most wanted fugitives. With the arrest of the top leadership the clan has been dealt another severe blow.

In January 2012, assets worth 110 million euros belonging to the Russo clan were seized by the Italian State including bank accounts in Milan, Turin and Florence and real estate in Viterbo.

== Current status ==
According to the investigators, after the arrest of all the old bosses of the organization, the clan is now managed by the new generation of the Russos, who would have begun to follow a plan to expand up to San Giuseppe Vesuviano, once under the influence of the Fabbrocino clan. The new leaders of the clan have also formed an alliance with the Mazzarella clan.

In May 2019, Antonio Russo, son of Pasquale Russo, was arrested. He is accused of extortion.

== See also ==
- List of members of the Camorra
- List of Camorra clans
- Salvatore Russo
- Pasquale Russo
- Camorra
- List of most wanted fugitives in Italy
- Alfieri clan
