= Cesarano clan =

- Founded: 1980s
- Founder: Ferdinando Cesarano
- Founding location: Castellammare di Stabia
- Years active: 1980s-present
- Territory: Castellammare di Stabia and Pompei
- Activities: Racketeering drug trafficking extortion usury
- Allies: Alfieri clan (defunct); Mallardo clan Galasso clan (defunct); Russo clan Pecoraro-Renna clan D'Alessandro clan
- Rivals: Moccia clan Matrone clan

The Cesarano clan is a Camorra clan from the town of Castellammare di Stabia, in the Metropolitan City of Naples.

== History ==
The founder and important figure of the clan was Ferdinando Cesarano (born August 26, 1954), a.k.a. "Nanduccio 'e Ponte Persica". Cesarano was known to be charismatic figure of the organized crime scene in the Campania since the late 1970s and early 1980s, in those years, he was a ruthless killer working for the Nuova Famiglia, reporting directly to Carmine Alfieri, and in close contact with the highest members of the organization. In the mid-80s, Ferdinando Cesarano, by then an established Camorra member after the defeat of the Nuova Camorra Organizzata led by Raffaele Cutolo and the dissolution of the winning Nuova Famiglia, decided to found his own clan.

In 1998, while Cesarano was in jail, the clan's affiliates planned the escape of Giuseppe "Geppino" Autorino (another important member of the clan) and Cesarano from the Court of Salerno, where the trial was happening. Subsequently the escape took place on June 22 of that year. After his escape, Cesarano would manage to remain free until his final arrest in 2000. In the same year he was sentenced to life imprisonment. Detained in the 41-bis regime, Ferdinando Cesarano graduated in Sociology in 2007 and in Law in 2015.

The clan is particularly operational in the Ponte Persica region, a small town belonging to the municipality of Castellammare di Stabia, and in Pompei, where, in particular, it carries out criminal activities such as the extortion, rackets, usury, and drug dealing. The clan went through a period of tension with the Matrone clan, due to the Cesaranos' attempts to expand their territories into Scafati and surroundings areas.

Since the arrest of Ferdinando Cesarano, Nicola Esposito, known as o’ mostr, took the reins of the organization. Esposito has been one of Cesarano's right-hand men since the 1990s, and was one of the minds behind his escape from the Court of Salerno in 1998. Esposito was arrested in 2014, held responsible for mafia-type associations, extortion, and illegal transport of firearms, aggravated by the mafia associations.

According to the investigations, the current leader of the organization is Luigi Di Martino, known as o' profeta.

== Leadership ==
- 1980s-2000 — Ferdinando Cesarano, known as Nanduccio 'e Ponte Persica. Arrested and sentenced to life imprisonment.
- 2000-2014 — Nicola Esposito, known as o’ mostr. Arrested in 2014.
- 2014–present — Luigi Di Martino, known as o' profeta.

== Activities ==
The clan, as it emerged from numerous investigations, controlled the racket in the flowers market in Castellammare di Stabia and Pompei. All the flowers markers reluctant to submit to the clan-imposed racket would be subjected to beatings and harassing conduct. In addition to the racket, the investigations revealed that members of the clan have founded a transport brokerage company, known as "Engy Service s.r.l.", in order to take on the monopoly of shipments of flowers, bulbs and pottery, coming mainly from the Netherlands. The investigation also revealed that the clan had made alliances with the Mallardo clan from Giugliano in Campania and the Pecoraro-Renna clan from Battipaglia.

in February 2020, the Guardia di Finanza seized a company, that according to the Antimafia, belonged to the clan, and was headed by Antonio Martone and Giovanni Esposito, both in prison, and brothers-in-law of Luigi Di Martino, boss of the clan. The purpose of this company was to stand between traders and carriers, in order to impose the services and tariffs of the clan on them. The Guardia di Finanza estimated the turnover of the business was at around €2 million.

The Cesaranos managed, in agreement with the D'Alessandro clan, another clan from Castellammare di Stabia, the monopoly on the funerals over Castellammare di Stabia. The funeral companies operating on Castellammare, in agreement with the clans, prevented entry or imposed bribes and the purchase of funeral articles to competing companies unrelated to the Cesarano and D'Alessandro clans. The main figure of the business was the entrepreneur Alfonso Cesarano, who, in a monopolistic manner, managed the funeral sector. Cesarano, repeatedly hit by anti-mafia operations and investigations, had founded a system of funeral companies apparently managed by relatives and various figureheads who, however, were instead controlled by him.

== See also ==
- Camorra
- List of members of the Camorra
- Nuova Famiglia
- List of Camorra clans
- Moccia clan
- Alfieri clan
- Nuova Camorra Organizzata
