= Lorusso =

Lorusso is an Italian surname. Notable people with the surname include:

- Benedetto Lorusso (born 1990), Italian footballer
- Francesco Lorusso (1952–1977), Italian militant
- Nicholas Lorusso (born 1967), American attorney
- Salvatore Lorusso (fl. 1970s–2020s), Italian chemist and art historian
- Silvio Lorusso (born 1985), Italian writer, artist and designer

== See also ==
- Lorusso Industries, a US restaurant foodservice retailer unrelated to Italian cuisine food operators; replaced by Cracker Barrel in 1990
- Lo Russo, surname
