= Marco Di Lauro =

Italian Camorrista and Di Lauro clan member

- Mug shot of Marco Di Lauro
- Born: 16 June 1980 (age 46); Naples, Italy
- Other name: F4 or Il Fantasma
- Parent(s): Paolo Di Lauro; Luisa D'Avanzo
- Relatives: Cosimo Di Lauro (brother)
- Status: Imprisoned since 2019
- Allegiance: Di Lauro clan / Camorra
- Convictions: Murder, drug trafficking, arson, armed robbery, racketeering and extortion
- Penalty: Life imprisonment

Marco Di Lauro (Italian pronunciation: [ˈmarko di ˈlauro]; born 16 June 1980) is an Italian Camorrista and member of the Di Lauro clan from Naples. After having been a fugitive for 14 years and been included on the list of most wanted fugitives in Italy, he was captured in Naples on 2 March 2019.

== History ==
Marco Di Lauro is the fourth son of imprisoned Camorra boss, Paolo Di Lauro aka Ciruzzo 'o milionario ("Ciruzzo the millionaire") and his wife Luisa D'Avanzo.

Di Lauro is reportedly known by the code F4 for figlio quattro (fourth son) or Il Fantasma (The Ghost).

According to the pentito Antonio Accurso, former leader of the Vanella Grassi, a criminal group linked to the Di Lauro clan, Marco Di Lauro created an alliance with the Sacra Corona Unita with the objective of expanding his drug trafficking business.

Di Lauro is in a relationship with Cira Marino, born in 1988, related to the Tamarisco clan from Torre Annunziata. The Tamariscos are believed to have links with the 'Ndrangheta, particularly the Pelle-Vottari 'Ndrina.

He was listed on "Italy's most wanted list" since 2004, for Camorra association and other crimes. On 17 November 2006, an international warrant was issued against him, to be arrested for extradition. He was arrested in Naples on 2 March 2019. While on the run, Di Lauro was believed to have resided in Dubai.

== Arrest ==
Marco Di Lauro was arrested on 2 March 2019 at his apartment in the Chiaiano district, Naples. At the time of the arrest, Di Lauro was with his wife and two cats. The arrest was reportedly linked to the murder on the same day of the wife of the right-hand man of Di Lauro, Salvatore Tamburrino. The operation involved around 150 officers.

According to Europol, Di Lauro was wanted over offences including murder, drug trafficking, arson, armed robbery, racketeering and extortion. After his arrest, the Italian Prime Minister Giuseppe Conte thanked police for the capture of the super fugitive, saying that it was another blow to organised crime.

On 11 November 2019, Marco Di Lauro was sentenced to life imprisonment, considered the mastermind behind the ambush in which Attilio Romanò, an innocent victim, was killed. The murder took place in January 2005, when the assassins of the Di Lauro clan had mistaken Romanò for the nephew of the boss Rosario Pariante, one of the Scissionistis with whom the Di Lauro clan was at war. After the trial was over, Attilio Romanò's family breathed a sigh of relief, his mother declared in tears: "I still don't believe it."

A few days after Marco Di Lauro's trial, his right-hand man, Salvatore Tamburrino, decided to break omertà and become a pentito. Tamburrino, who is in prison for the murder of his wife, Norina Matuozzo, is expected by the magistrates to reconstruct the last years of the Camorra of Secondigliano, shedding light on strategies, business and revealing the names of the unsuspected white collar workers linked to the clan.

== In popular culture ==
- Gomorrah (TV series) Inspired by the Di Lauro clan and in their war against the Scissionisti di Secondigliano led by Raffaele Amato.

== See also ==
- Cosimo Di Lauro
- Di Lauro clan
- List of Camorra clans
- List of members of the Camorra
- List of most wanted fugitives in Italy
- Paolo Di Lauro
- Sacra Corona Unita
