= Cosimo Di Lauro =

Italian mob boss (1973–2022)

- Born: 8 December 1973; Naples, Italy
- Died: 13 June 2022 (aged 48); Opera, Lombardy, Italy
- Height: 1.77 m (5 ft 10 in)
- Parent(s): Paolo Di Lauro; Luisa D'Avanzo
- Relatives: Marco Di Lauro (brother)
- Status: Imprisoned since 2005
- Allegiance: Di Lauro clan / Camorra
- Criminal charges: Murder; Mafia association
- Penalty: Life in prison

Cosimo Di Lauro (8 December 1973 – 13 June 2022) was an Italian Camorrista who was acting boss of the Di Lauro clan from Naples. Due to his flamboyant nature and passion for designer clothes, he earned the nickname "The Designer Don". Di Lauro is known by some as "o' Chiatto" (fat boy), and to journalists as the "prince regent".

== Biography ==
=== Taking over from his father ===
As the eldest son of the Camorra boss, Paolo Di Lauro aka Ciruzzo 'o milionario ("Ciruzzo the millionaire"), Cosimo took over control of the family business after his father needed to hide from the police.

Cosimo Di Lauro wanted to centralise the drug-dealing operation that had been run as a franchise in which dealers paid the Di Lauros a fee for doing business and were allowed to buy the drugs from any available source. He removed older gangsters and replaced them with young toughs new to the business. In revolt, a faction known as the "secessionists" (Italian: Scissionisti) challenged the Di Lauros in October 2004.

=== Scampia feud ===
One of the local dealers, Raffaele Amato, disputed the new rules, fled to Spain and organised a revolt against his former bosses. In Scampia, they are known as the Spaniards. Raffaele Amato ordered the killing of Fulvio Montanino and Claudio Salierno, loyal to Di Lauro, on 28 October 2004. During their funeral three days later, police arrested two men armed with machine guns who were planning to spray the funeral procession.

The resulting gang war, known as the Scampia feud, resulted in over 60 murders in 2004 and 2005. The two bands fought each other with a brutality that stunned even hardened Carabinieri. The feud caused widespread public revulsion against the Camorra and led to a major crackdown by the authorities, resulting in the capture and imprisonment of high-ranking Camorra figures, including his father.

=== Arrest ===
Cosimo Di Lauro was eventually arrested on 21 January 2005, in the neighbourhood of Scampia. In February, 2008, he was handed down a 15-year prison sentence for associazione camorristica. On 13 December 2008, he was again sentenced to life imprisonment for ordering the murder of Gelsomina Verde, the former girlfriend of a rival Scissionisti gangster, Gennaro Notturno on 21 November 2004.

Gelsomina was abducted, tortured and subsequently murdered by Di Lauro clan members, in an effort to make her disclose Notturno's whereabouts. The killers then set her body on fire inside her car, in order to protect them from the "evil eye".

=== Death ===
Cosimo Di Lauro died in prison on 13 June 2022, whilst under the 41-bis prison regime, as a result of physical deterioration. He was 48 years old. Di Lauro's funeral was held in a private ceremony in Secondigliano on 21 June, 2022. According to the media, his brothers did not attend the funeral.

== In popular culture ==
The Gomorrah TV series was inspired by the Di Lauro clan and their war against the Scissionisti di Secondigliano led by Raffaele Amato.
