= Contini clan =

Criminal organization

- Founded: Early 1980s
- Founded by: Edoardo Contini
- Founding location: Naples
- Years active: 1980s-present
- Territory: Various neighborhoods in Naples. Territories in Rimini in Italy, Amsterdam in the Netherlands, Barcelona in Spain and Eastern Europe
- Ethnicity: Campanian
- Membership: 150–250 full members, unknown number of associates
- Criminal activities: Racketeering, fraud, smuggling, extortion, drug trafficking, prostitution, money laundering, counterfeit
- Allies: Mallardo clan Licciardi clan Di Lauro clan Rinaldi clan Moccia clan Mariano clan Commisso 'ndrina Ukrainian mafia Cesarano clan
- Rivals: Mazzarella clan Giuliano clan (defunct); Caldarelli Clan

The Contini clan is a powerful Neapolitan Camorra clan operating in the city of Naples, and more specifically in the area of the Naples Central Station. The clan's traditional powerbase is the Arenaccia district. It also operates in the Poggioreale, Vasto, Mercato and San Carlo all'Arena suburbs of Naples. The clan is also active outside Italy, particularly in Barcelona, Spain, in Amsterdam, Netherlands, and in Eastern Europe. The Contini clan is also one of the founding clans of the Secondigliano Alliance, which is considered by the authorities as the most powerful Camorra group that is still active.

== History ==
The organization was created by Camorra boss, Edoardo Contini, in the early 1980s. Few years later, he joined the Nuova Famiglia confederation against the Nuova Camorra Organizzata led by Raffaele Cutolo, in this time he was leading a criminal group in San Carlo all'Arena.

In the mid-1980s, Contini was already considered one of the most influential criminals in Naples, obtaining the Eastern European market for cocaine, after a meeting with narco-traffickers from Colombia and Sicilian mobsters. In that time, he founded the Secondigliano Alliance with Francesco Mallardo and Gennaro Licciardi.

The power of Contini is based on his entrepreneurial skills as well as the choice of weapons only in extreme cases. The lack of internal divisions and pentiti (collaborators of justice) has made its membership almost invulnerable compared to the other Neapolitan clans. The organization is unique in the fact that no one has ever betrayed Eduardo Contini and none of his underlings have ever attempted to reach the organization's top spot, thereby creating a rift in the organization.

Before his arrest, Edoardo Contini appeared on the list of thirty most dangerous fugitives in Italy.

== Operations ==
In 2017, the Guardia di Finanza, confiscated €320 million belonging to the Contini clan, including gas stations between Campania and Molise, a bar between Naples and Avellino, tobacco shops, coffee roasting companies, jewelers and about thirty properties including a villa in Ischia. And according to the investigators it was just a fraction of their wealth.

In 2019, after the arrest of Marco Di Lauro, leader of the Di Lauro clan and fourth son of Paolo Di Lauro, the Contini clan became the most powerful clan of the Camorra, thanks to no internal split, and no having affiliates that became collaborators of justice. The clan is present in the drugs trafficking, extortion, betting and counterfeiting, also investing hundreds of millions of euros in various countries of Europe.

The Di Lauro clan allegedly has an alliance with the Contini clan, particularly with Ciro Contini, the nephew of the boss Edoardo Contini. According to the pentito Domenico Esposito both clans have a pact with regards to the drug trafficking business.

The organization is said to cooperate with the Ukrainian mafia in the cigarette smuggling business. The Ukrainians would smuggle the cigarettes from Ukraine and Eastern Europe into Italy, where with the help of the Contini clan it supplies the Neapolitan market.

Investigations of the Italian police reveals links between the Contini clan and the Crupi brothers, members of the powerful Commisso 'ndrina. Both organizations are reportedly cooperating in the drug trafficking business.

In September 2019, Luigi Di Martino, nicknamed ‘o profeta, was transferred to the 41-bis prison regime. Di Martino was a key player in the alliance between the Contini clan and the historical Cesarano clan from Castellammare di Stabia.

In October 2019, the Italian police dismantled a branch of the organization based in the city Rimini and headed by Ciro Contini, known as o’ nirone, who ran the group from behind bars using a clandestine mobile phone. He is described as a violent, homophobic and sexist boss as well as extremely dangerous because he "killed for fun". He would told his girlfriend that the females cannot attend the men's meetings inside the clan. Contini, who is nephew of Edoardo, was unwanted and considered a "maverick" by the top members of the organization in Naples, so he had shifted his influence to the Emilia-Romagna area where he had founded the new group.

On November 08, 2019, the Italian police arrested Gaetano Attardo, considered a prominent member of the clan. He was arrested in a villa in the Castel Volturno region.

Antonio Righi, called "Tonino il biondo", was considered by the investigators as a money launderer on behalf of the clan in England. Among the British companies that figured in his scheme, was one registered at a luxurious terraced house not far from Oxford Street in London’s West End. The trial built against Righi clearly showed that he understood exactly how modern global finance works. The Italian police confiscated 250 million euros belonging to him.

After months of investigations and joint activities of the Interpol, on June 3, 2020, the Italian government finally obtained the extradition of Salvatore Vittorio from Dominican Republic to Italy. Vittorio was considered the money launderer of the Contini clan in Santo Domingo. According to the Italian authorities, he is accused of mafia-type criminal association and money laundering.

== See also ==
- Camorra
- List of members of the Camorra
- Licciardi clan
- List of Camorra clans
- Di Lauro clan
- Mallardo clan
- Secondigliano Alliance
