= Salvatore Russo =

Italian Camorrista

- Mug shot of Salvatore Russo
- Born: 27 June 1958 (age 68); Nola, Italy
- Occupation: Boss of the Russo clan
- Relatives: Pasquale Russo (brother)
- Status: In prison in Italy
- Allegiance: Russo clan / Camorra
- Criminal charge: Murder
- Penalty: Life in prison

Salvatore Russo (Italian pronunciation: [salvaˈtoːre ˈrusso]; born 27 June 1958 in Nola) is an Italian Camorrista and boss of the Russo clan from Nola, which he co-founded. He has been running the clan together with his brother Pasquale for over thirty years. He has been on the "most wanted list" of the Italian Ministry of the Interior since 1995, for Camorra association, murder, concealment of corpse and other crimes. On 15 April 1994, an international warrant was issued against him, to be arrested for extradition.

The criminal career of the Russo brothers started in the 1970s, and they had close ties to Mario Fabbrocino and Michele Zaza. Later, they were at the top of the clan of Carmine Alfieri.

In March 2008, assets worth 300 million euros belonging to the Russo clan were seized by the Italian State, including real estate, two supermarkets, luxury cars, and Swiss bank accounts. Police said the Russo clan had total control over illegal activity in about 40 towns in the Naples region.

Salvatore Russo was arrested on 31 October 2009 in Somma Vesuviana, close to his native area Nola. He had set up a small hideout at a chicken and rabbit farm. The arrest was made just after 7:00 am at the farm after Russo returned from hunting. His brother Pasquale was arrested a day later, on 1 November 2009, in Sperone (Avellino) together with their younger brother Carmine Russo, a fugitive since 2007 and on the list of 100 most wanted fugitives. With the arrest of the top leadership, the clan has been dealt another severe blow. He is now serving a life sentence.
