= Femminiello =

Third gender role in traditional Neapolitan culture

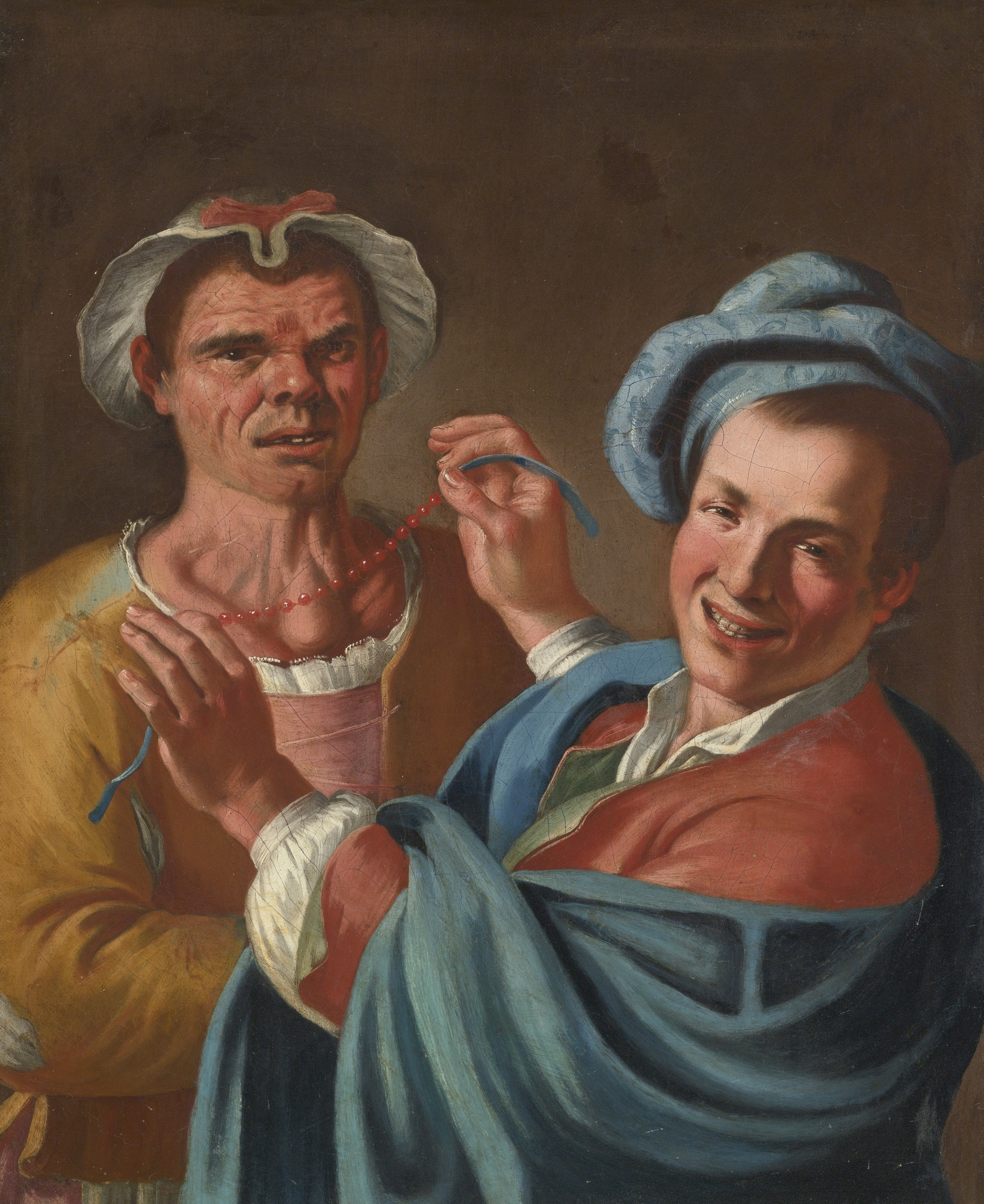
Il femminiello, painted by Giuseppe Bonito (1707–1789) sometime between 1740 and 1760. The femminiello's missing teeth and goitre could be signs of poverty and malnutrition. The red coral necklace is depicted as a representation of good fortune, which is often associated with femmenielli.

Femminielli or femmenielli (singular femminiello, also spelled as femmeniello) are a population of people who embody a third gender role in traditional Neapolitan culture. This term is culturally distinct from trans woman, and has its own cultural significance and practices. This term is not derogatory; instead femminielli are traditionally believed to bring good luck.

== Etymology ==
Derived from Neapolitan femmena 'woman' with the suffix -iello, which is a masculine diminutive suffix of endearment, the term roughly translates to 'little women-men'. Neither derogatory nor an insult, it is instead used in a descriptive capacity.

== Contemporary ==
There has been dispute about whether it is accurate to insert the Neapolitan femminiello within the contemporary term transgender, usually adopted in Northern European and North American contexts. Despite conflation of the term in mainstream media, historians maintain that an important aspect of i femminielli is that they are decidedly male despite their female gender role.

Many consider femminiello to be a peculiar gender expression deeply tied to the history of the city of Naples, despite a widespread sexual binarism. The cultural roots that this phenomenon is embedded in confer to the femminiello a socially legitimized status, including holding particular familial, ceremonial, and cultural roles. Achille della Ragione, a Neapolitan scholar, has written of social aspects of femminielli. "[The femminiello] is usually the youngest male child, 'mother's little darling,' ... he is useful, he does chores, runs errands and watches the kids."

In 2009 the term femminiello gained some notoriety in Italian media after a Naples native femminiello Camorra mobster Ketty Gabriele was arrested. Gabriele, who had engaged in prostitution prior to becoming a capo, has been referred to both as a femminiello and transessuale or trans in Italian media.

Some scholars, including Eugenio Zito of the University of Naples Federico II, propose that the femminielli "seem to confirm, in the field of gender identity, the postmodern idea of continuous modulation between the masculine and the feminine against their dichotomy."

== History ==
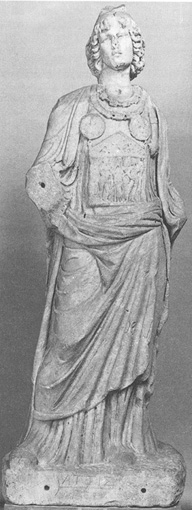
Statue of a gallus priest in contemporary feminine clothing, 2nd century, Capitoline Museums

The constant references in many sources to the ancient rituals behind the presence of the femminiello in Naples require little comment. The links to ancient Greek mythology are numerous: for example, Hermaphroditus, who possessed the beauty of their mother, Aphrodite, and the strength of their father, Hermes; or Tiresias, the blind prophet of Thebes, famous for being transformed into a woman for seven years. Both of these personages and others in many cultures in the world are presumed to possess something that others do not: the wise equilibrium that comes from knowing both worlds, masculine and feminine.

The history of the femminielli may trace back to a real, non-mythological group: the Galli (also called Galloi or Gallae, singular gallus), a significant portion of the ancient priesthood of the mother goddess Cybele and her consort Attis. This tradition began in Phrygia (where Turkey is today, part of Asia Minor), sometime before 300 BC. After 205 BC, the tradition entered the city of Rome, and spread throughout the Roman Empire, as far north as London. They were eunuchs who wore bright-colored feminine sacerdotal clothing, hairstyles or wigs, makeup, and jewelry, and used feminine mannerisms in their speech. They addressed one another by feminine titles, such as sister. There were other priests and priestesses of Cybele who were not eunuchs, so it would not have been necessary to become a gallus or eunuch in order to become a priest of Cybele. The Gallae were not ascetic but hedonistic, so castration was not about stopping sexual desires. Some Gallae would marry men, and others would marry women. The ways of the Gallae were more consistent with transgender people with gender dysphoria, which they relieved by voluntary castration, as the available form of sex reassignment surgery.

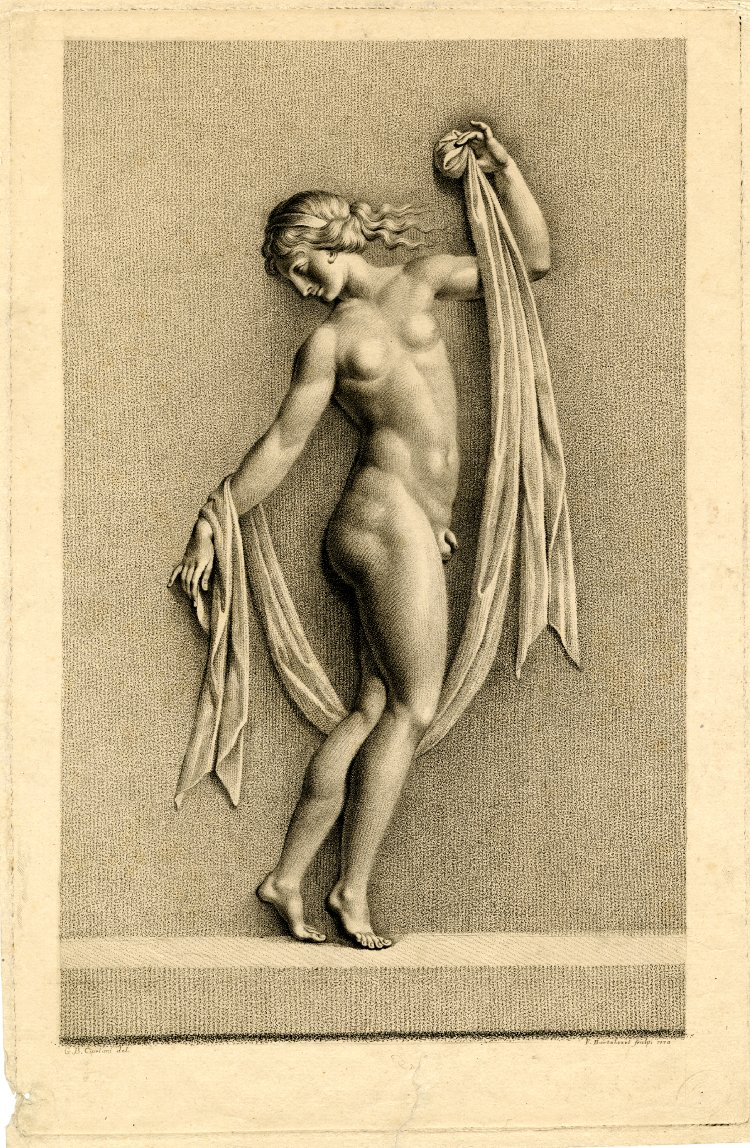
Hermaphroditus, the son of Hermes and Aphrodite

Contemporaries who were not Gallae called them by masculine words, Galloi or Galli (plural), or Gallus (singular). Some historians interpret the Gallae as transgender, by modern terms, and think they would have called themselves by the feminine Gallae (plural) and Galla (singular). The Roman poet Ovid (43 BC – 17 AD) says their name comes from the Gallus river in Phrygia.

Phrygians and Romans believed the Gallae had spiritual powers to tell the future, bless homes, have power over wild animals, bring rain, and exorcise evil spirits. The Roman public viewed them with a mixture of awe and contempt, seeing them as practicing shocking foreign customs, so they were just as often honored as they were harassed and politically persecuted. They were not allowed to be Roman citizens, and vice versa.

=== Ceremony ===
A ceremony called the matrimonio dei femminielli takes place in Torre Annunziata on Easter Monday, where a parade of femminielli dressed in wedding gowns and accompanied by a "husband" travel through the streets in horse-drawn carriages.

=== Tradition ===
The femminiello in Campania enjoy a relatively privileged position thanks to their participation in some traditional events, such as Candelora al Santuario di Montevergine (Candlemas at the Sanctuary of Montevergine) in Avellino or the Tammurriata, a traditional dance performed at the feast of Madonna dell'Arco in Sant'Anastasia.

Generally femminielli are considered to bring good luck. For this reason, it is popular in the neighborhoods for a femminiello to hold a newborn baby, or participate in games such as bingo. Above all the Tombola or Tombolata dei femminielli, a popular game performed every year on 2 February, as the conclusive part of the Candlemas at the Sanctuary of Montevergine.

== Theatre ==
In a stage production La Gatta Cenerentola ('Cinderella the Cat'), by Roberto De Simone, femmenielli play the roles of several important characters. Among the major scenes in this respect are the rosario dei femmenielli and il suicidio del femminiella.

== See also ==
- LGBT rights in Italy
- List of transgender-related topics
- Travesti
- Two-spirit
- Hijra
