= Secondigliano Alliance =

Confederation of Camorra clans

- Founded: Late 1980s
- Founded by: Eduardo Contini; Francesco Mallardo; Gennaro Licciardi
- Founding location: Secondigliano, Naples, Italy
- Years active: 1980s-present
- Territory: Numerous neighborhoods in Naples, and numerous towns in the province of Naples. Outside Italy, its present in Spain and in the Netherlands.
- Criminal activities: Racketeering, Fraud, Smuggling, Extortion, Drug trafficking, Money laundering, Political corruption, Human trafficking
- Allies: Founding clans: Contini clan; Licciardi clan; Mallardo clan; Di Lauro clan Mariano clan Rinaldi clan De Luca Bossa clan Aprea-Cuccaro clan Commisso 'ndrina
- Rivals: Mazzarella clan

The Secondigliano Alliance (Italian: Alleanza di Secondigliano) is a strategic alliance of Camorra clans in the Italian city of Naples and its hinterland, controlling drug trafficking and extortion rackets in many areas of the city since the 1990s.

Currently, its considered by law enforcement authorities to be one of the two most powerful criminal organizations within the Camorra, alongside the Mazzarella clan, a long-standing rival of the Alliance.

The criminal group has branches in the Netherlands and in Spain, with interests in international drug trafficking and money laundering.

== Early years ==
The Secondigliano Alliance originally consisted of the Licciardi clan and the Contini clan from Naples and the Mallardo clan from Giugliano. It was initiated by Gennaro Licciardi, who built his clan in the early 1990s in Secondigliano, a northern suburb of Naples. The alliance included Edoardo Contini and Francesco Mallardo, and dominated the Neapolitan underworld during the 1990s. When the three male leaders died or were imprisoned, Licciardi’s sister Maria Licciardi was left in charge of the alliance. Under her leadership, the alliance became more organized, secretive, sophisticated and consequently more powerful.

The reign of Maria Licciardi ran smoothly for many years until a disagreement arose over a consignment of pure unrefined Turkish heroin in the spring of 1999. Licciardi decreed it should not be used, as it was too chemically pure for drug users and would likely kill them. However, the Lo Russo clan, then an important ally of the Alliance, disagreed and repackaged the shipment for sale on the streets, resulting in the deaths of many. The subsequent great public outrage resulted in massive police crackdowns on the Camorra clans, with many camorristi arrested and imprisoned. The Lo Russo clan eventually split from the alliance, leading to a violent gang war against the other clans which claimed 120 lives in Naples and the surrounding region.

After Maria Licciardi was arrested in 2001, her brother Vincenzo Licciardi took over the Secondigliano Alliance along with Paolo Di Lauro and Edoardo Contini. Vincenzo Licciardi was himself arrested on February 7, 2008.

In June 2019, Italian police arrested more than 120 members of the Alliance in an anti-Camorra operation. Police also confiscated €130 million. Among those who were arrested were the wives of the bosses of the Bosti, Mallardo, Licciardi and Contini clans, as well as their lieutenants, children, grandchildren and entrepreneurs who worked for the alliance. The historical female boss managed to escape from the arrest in the operation.

Despite numerous police operations, the Secondigliano Alliance is still considered the most powerful organization in the Camorra.

In May 2020, Patrizio Bosti, a leader of the Secondigliano Alliance and one of the most powerful living Camorra bosses, was released from prison. Bosti, who was serving a prison sentence since his arrest in Spain in 2008, was not due to be released until 2023; however, he mounted a successful legal challenge against the state, citing inhumane treatment due to overcrowding. According to the investigations, Bosti's freedom makes the Secondigliano Alliance even stronger; considering that Maria Licciardi is also free, this allows the organization to have two of its historical leaders out of prison. On May 16, 2020, Bosti was rearrested. The new prison order concerns a recalculation of the sentence by the Emilia-Romagna judiciary, as he was serving his sentence in the region on the basis of documents provided by the Naples Public Prosecutor. According to the authorities, Bosti has to serve another six years in jail.

Alessia Salera, a Secondigliano Secretary, was arrested again at Rome's Ciampino airport by Carabinieri on the orders of Naples prosecutors, alleged to have been running extortion rackets as head of the Licciardi Camorra clan, on 7 August 2021 when attempting to travel to Spain.

== Current status ==
In April 2025, a major police operation coordinated by the Naples Public Prosecutor’s Office led to the arrest of eight individuals believed to be key members or associates of the Alliance. The suspects face a wide range of serious charges, including mafia-type criminal association, homicide, concealment of a corpse, drug trafficking, illegal possession and carrying of firearms, extortion, personal aiding, money laundering, and handling of stolen goods. The investigation focused particularly on the Licciardi clan’s stronghold in the Rione Don Guanella area, uncovering the group’s direct involvement in the 2019 murder of Domenico Gargiulo, a former member of rival clans, who had survived previous assassination attempts before being fatally lured into a trap. The killing, reportedly orchestrated by both the Licciardi and Sautto-Ciccarelli clans in coordination with the Abbinante clan, was interpreted by prosecutors as both an act of strategic retribution and an assertion of territorial dominance. Additionally, authorities documented the Licciardi clan’s control over local drug distribution networks, their management of stolen vehicles through extortion schemes known as cavallo di ritorno, and the systematic arming of affiliates for use in violent enforcement.

On May 29, 2025, Francesco Mallardo, the notorious boss of the Mallardo clan and a founding member of the Secondigliano Alliance, passed away. Known as "Ciccio 'e Carlantonio," Mallardo had turned 74 in early April. At the time of his death, he was serving a 30-year prison sentence, but had recently been transferred to a rehabilitation facility in Emilia-Romagna due to health issues.

== Activities ==
The Alliance is strongly active in Spain: numerous important members of the organization were arrested in the country, such as Paolo Di Mauro, who died in 2018, and was considered by the authorities one of its top associates, particularly linked to the Continis.

Seven members of the organization were also arrested in Spain, Netherlands, South America and the Balkans, where they were running illicit businesses on behalf of the Alliance.

The Alliance is also believed to use Santo Domingo in the Dominican Republic to launder money.

The group is believed by the authorities to be allied with the Commisso 'ndrina in the trafficking and sale of cocaine and marijuana from South America, via the Netherlands.

== See also ==
- List of members of the Camorra
- List of Camorra clans
- Giuliano clan
- Scissionisti di Secondigliano
