= Michele Lo Russo =

Italian footballer

Personal information
- Full name: Michele Lo Russo
- Date of birth: 1 February 1947
- Place of birth: Bari, Italy
- Date of death: 2 December 1983 (aged 36)
- Place of death: Mola di Bari, Italy
- Position: Defender

Senior career*
Years	Team	Apps	(Gls)
1966–1968	Bernalda	31	(?)
1968–1970	Venosa	66	(?)
1970–1983	Lecce	418	(1)
- * Club domestic league appearances and goals as of 12:45, 20 September 2012 (UTC)

Michele Lo Russo, also referred to as Michele Lorusso, (1 February 1947 – 2 December 1983) was an Italian footballer who played as a defender. He played 418 matches for Lecce between 1970 and 1983, the most of any player in the history of the club.

Lo Russo began his career at Bernalda, before joining Venosa two years later. After two years there, he joined Lecce, where he broke the club's all-time appearance record, which still stands today.

His career was cut short due to his untimely death in 1983 aged only 36. He died along with his team-mate Ciro Pezzella in a car accident whilst travelling to an away match against Varese. Lo Russo and Pezzella were driving to catch a train from Bari, as they had a fear of flying.
