= Moccia clan =

Criminal organization

- Founded: 1960s
- Founded by: Gennaro Moccia
- Founding location: Afragola
- Years active: 1960s-present
- Territory: Metropolitan City of Naples: Afragola, Caivano, Casoria, Cardito, Carditello, Frattamaggiore, Frattaminore, Crispano; Presence also in the Lazio region.
- Criminal activities: Racketeering drug trafficking Money laundering Political corruption
- Allies: Russo clan Alfieri clan (defunct); Licciardi clan Galasso clan (defunct); Sacco-Bocchetti clan Contini clan
- Rivals: Magliulo clan (defunct); Cesarano clan

The Moccia clan is a powerful Camorra clan operating in the areas of Afragola, Casoria, Arzano, Caivano and surrounding areas. The clan is considered the oldest that is still active in the northeast area of the Metropolitan City of Naples. The organization has also a strong presence in the Lazio region. It's also defined as one of the most difficult clans to investigate precisely because of their ability to launder money.

== Background ==
The clan was founded by Gennaro Moccia in the 1960s, in Afragola. Moccia was killed in a Camorra attack in April 1974, probably by a group of killers belonging to a rival clan. Since Gennaro's death, his wife Anna Mazza has taken the reins of the clan. Eventually, Mazza was the first woman in Italy who was convicted of Mafia-related crimes. Over the years, Mazza made her eldest son, Antonio Moccia, join the clan's business, becoming her righthand man and one of the heads of the organization. According to the investigations, since the early years of the leadership of Mazza and her son, the clan would have total control of the territory of Afragola. The Moccia clan was always a loyal member of the Nuova Famiglia in the war against the Nuova Camorra Organizzata led by Raffaele Cutolo.

In 1987, Mazza's favorite son Vincenzo Moccia, called Angioletto, was killed by the rival Magliulo clan, that led to another bloody war between the clans, the Moccias came out victorious. With the downfall of the Magliulo clan, the Moccia clan shot down one of the pillars of the Alfieri clan in the northeast area of Naples.

== Structure ==
The Moccia clan is structured vertically. The organization is made up of a confederation of different decine, with second-level criminals who report directly to the leaders of every decina. Another factor that contributes to the clan's power is that none of the high-ranking members of the Moccia has ever become a pentito. At best they have only disassociated themselves from the organization.

== Activities ==
The Moccia clan controls the drug trafficking in the town of Caivano, more precisely in the notorious Parco Verde. Luigi Moccia, another of the sons of Gennaro Moccia and Anna Mazza, is considered to be the white collar member of the clan, the true mind of the Moccias, exchanging the common bloody wars involving several Camorra clans for a criminal holding. Because of Luigi's entrepreneurial skills, the clan switched from drug trafficking to top-level business affairs, having a political penetration force in the territories under their influence.

== Current status ==
In the present day, although it remains an extremely strong organization, the Moccia clan has lost much of its power, and other criminal groups began to emerge in territories where the Moccias used to have absolute control. On September 27, 2017, the historical boss of the clan, Anna Mazza, died in her house in Acerra. She was 80 years old.

== See also ==
- Camorra
- List of members of the Camorra
- Nuova Famiglia
- List of Camorra clans
- Alfieri clan
- Raffaele Cutolo
- Nuova Camorra Organizzata
