= Francesco Matrone =

Italian Camorrista (1947–2023)

- Mug shot of Matrone
- Born: 15 July 1947; Scafati, Campania, Italy
- Died: 5 October 2023 (aged 76); Milan, Lombardy, Italy
- Other name: 'A Belva
- Occupation: Crime boss
- Children: Michele Matrone
- Allegiance: Matrone clan, Camorra
- Criminal charges: Murder
- Penalty: Two life sentences

Francesco Matrone (Italian pronunciation: [franˈtʃesko maˈtroːne]; 15 July 1947 – 5 October 2023) was an Italian Camorrista. He was on the "most wanted list" of the Italian ministry of the Interior for murder in 2007 and other organized crime related charges until his arrest on 17 August 2012, in Battipaglia (Campania).

== History ==
In the 1980s, Matrone was the right-hand man of the former godfather of the Nuova Famiglia, Carmine Alfieri. After the dissolution of the Nuova Famiglia, Francesco Matrone, headed one of the most powerful clans based in the Province of Salerno.

Matrone received two life sentences for a double homicide. Matrone was at the head of the Loreto-Matrone clan of the Camorra, along with Pasquale Loreto (now pentito). Matrone, known as 'A Belva ("The Beast"), is believed to have laundered money in restaurants and bars in various regions of Salerno. He was also known for his love of animals, dogs in particular, in the time of his arrest, in a rural house in Acerno, he asked the police to allow his son to look after the dogs he had inside the hideout.

His clan is considered to be in decline, especially compared to the 1990s, when it was predominant in Scafati and surroundings.

In 2019, his son Michele Matrone caused controversy posting a photo with Matteo Salvini, with the caption: "A coffee with my dear friend Matteo". The publication, before being removed from Matrone's social media, received several "likes", even from Scafati's current city councilors. According to the media, Michele now lives in Emilia Romagna.

Francesco Matrone died on 5 October 2023, at the age of 76, in Milan's Opera Prison, where he was serving two life sentences in the 41-bis regime.
