= Licciardi clan =

Criminal organization

- Founded: 1980s
- Founded by: Gennaro Licciardi
- Founding location: Secondigliano, Naples
- Years active: 1980s-present
- Territory: Territory in Scampia, Chiaiano, Miano, San Pietro a Patierno. Outside Italy, the organization is present in Spain, and in the Netherlands.
- Criminal activities: Racketeering, fraud, smuggling, extortion, drug trafficking, prostitution
- Allies: Contini clan Mallardo clan Nuvoletta clan Mariano clan Polverino clan Moccia clan Giuliano clan 'Ndrangheta

The Licciardi clan (Italian pronunciation: [litˈtʃardi]) is a powerful Neapolitan Camorra clan that operates in the remote areas of Naples, specifically in the Secondigliano district and its stronghold of Masseria Cardone. Its sphere of influence extends to Scampia, Chiaiano, Miano and San Pietro a Patierno.

The Licciardi clan is also one of the clans that belongs to the Secondigliano Alliance, that is considered by the authorities as the most powerful Camorra group that is still active.

== Leadership ==
- 1980s-1994: Gennaro Licciardi, known as a scigna. (Died in prison in 1994)
- 1994-2008: Vincenzo Licciardi. (Arrested in 2008)
- 1994–present: Maria Licciardi, known as La Madrina.

== History ==
In the mid-eighties, Gennaro Licciardi, known as "a scigna-la scimmia", "the monkey" was the capozona in the district of Secondigliano for the Giuliano clan of Forcella. At that time, Licciardi was the second-in-command to boss Luigi Giuliano. The outskirts of the Secondigliano district was considered to be unimportant by the other Camorra bosses. A few years later, Gennaro Licciardi formed a fully independent clan that managed to turn the area into a strategic hub for the storage and trafficking of drugs. He also became the founding member of the Secondigliano Alliance, a coalition of powerful Camorra clans which controls drug trafficking and extortion rackets in many suburbs of Naples. Apart from the Licciardi clan, the alliance included the Contini, Mallardo, Lo Russo, Stabile, Prestieri, Bocchetti and Di Lauro clans.

After the death of Gennaro by blood poisoning in the Voghera prison on August 3, 1994, the management of the clan fell entirely to the brothers, Pietro "the Roman Emperor" and Vincenzo and also to his sister Maria, known as "la Piccolina", "the little one".

The clan used its influence to mediate between the Di Lauro clan and the so-called "secessionists" (Italian "scissionisti"), a breakaway fraction from the Di Lauro clan in the northern suburbs of Naples that tried to assert its control over drugs and prostitution rackets in the area. It therefore played an important role in putting an end to the Scampia feud.

On May 9, 2008, the Carabinieri seized goods worth 300 million euros and arrested 44 members of the Licciardi clan.

In February 2019, Giuseppe Musella, son of Maria Licciardi, was arrested. According to investigations, he was the current leader of the clan. Musella was arrested in Scampia for criminal association, robbery and kidnapping.

In August 2021, Maria Licciardi was arrested by the Carabinieri's ROS at Rome Ciampino Airport under a detention order issued by the Public Prosecutor's Office of Naples while she was preparing to travel to Spain. The arrest followed an investigation into alleged mafia-type association, extortion, receiving money of illicit origin, and interference with a judicial auction. Investigators stated that Licciardi had assumed the leadership of the Licciardi clan after her release from prison in 2009 and documented her alleged role in directing the organization's activities. Authorities also noted that she had evaded arrest during Operation Cartagena in 2019.

In December 2025, Gavino De Gregorio, a municipal councillor of Terracina, in Lazio was arrested in an investigation by the Rome District Anti-Mafia Directorate into alleged mafia-related electoral corruption in connection with individuals linked to the Licciardi clan. According to the investigating judge’s order, De Gregorio had contacts with Eduardo Marano, who is connected to the Licciardi clan and the Alleanza di Secondigliano through his wife, Patrizia Licciardi. The investigation reported intercepted communications suggesting that De Gregorio assisted Marano and his family even before entering politics, including through his work as an insurance agent and visits to members of the Licciardi-linked circle in Secondigliano. Investigators alleged that De Gregorio sought electoral support in exchange for assistance in managing administrative matters benefiting Marano’s network. The inquiry also described alleged intimidation and violent conduct connected to extortion activities, with a total of 22 suspects charged with offences including mafia association, extortion, and related crimes under Article 416-bis of the Italian Criminal Code.

In May 2026, Pietro Izzo, described as a senior figure of the clan, was arrested in Alicante, Spain, by the State Police in cooperation with Spanish authorities, Europol, and international police networks, after evading capture for nearly a year. The investigation, coordinated by the Naples District Anti-Mafia Directorate and carried out by specialized police units, identified his location through monitoring of relatives preparing a trip to Spain. He was arrested while in the company of family members. Izzo had been sought under a detention order for aggravated extortion under mafia methods, related to alleged extortion activities targeting construction sites in Naples. The investigation included recorded statements and complaints from an entrepreneur, which were used as key evidence.

== Activities ==
On March 21, 2018, 19 arrests were made in Rome of alleged members belonging to the Licciardi clan and members of the Filippone 'ndrina and Gallico 'ndrina accused of drug trafficking.

According to Francesco Forgione, the former president of the Antimafia Commission, the Licciardi clan is active in the Netherlands, using the country to counterfeit clothes.

== See also ==
- Camorra
- List of members of the Camorra
- Contini clan
- List of Camorra clans
- 'Ndrangheta
- Mallardo clan
- Secondigliano Alliance
