= Edoardo Contini =

Italian Camorra boss

- Born: 6 July 1955 (age 71); Naples, Italy
- Other names: Faccia d'Angelo 'o Romano
- Occupations: Founder and head of the Contini clan
- Relatives: Ciro Contini (nephew)
- Status: Imprisoned since 2007
- Allegiance: Contini clan / Camorra
- Criminal charges: drug trafficking; Mafia association
- Penalty: 20 years

Edoardo Contini (Italian pronunciation: [edoˈardo konˈtiːni]; born July 6, 1955) is an Italian Camorra boss. He is the founder and head of the Contini clan, a Camorra clan with its central base in the Arenaccia, that also operates in the Poggioreale, Vasto, Mercato and San Carlo all'Arena suburbs of Naples.

He is known as Faccia d'Angelo ("Angel Face") and 'o Romano ("the Roman"), due to his business connections in Rome. In 2001, Contini was included on the list of most wanted fugitives in Italy and eventually captured on December 14, 2007. Prior to his arrest, he was alleged to be one of the most powerful bosses of the Camorra.

== Early life ==
Edoardo Contini was born in the Vasto quarter of Naples, but his father Augusto moved after a short time in the notorious district of Amicizia, which became the headquarters of the clan. He began his criminal career as a small robber. He made the "qualitative leap" by marrying Maria Aieta, the sister of Mallardo clan boss, Francesco Mallardo.

== Secondigliano Alliance ==
Contini, together with Mallardo and Gennaro Licciardi of the Licciardi clan, was one of the founding members of the Secondigliano Alliance in the mid-1980s. The Secondigliano Alliance was created with the sole purpose to control the drug trade and the extortion rackets in many suburbs of Naples. Thus, according to Francesco Forgione, president of parliament's anti-mafia commission, Contini built one of the most dangerous and violent cartels to ever exist in the Neapolitan underworld. Furthermore, Italian Interior Minister Giuliano Amato labeled Contini as "perhaps the most dangerous boss in Naples".

Contini is also credited with having revolutionized the Camorra, turning it into a major force in the lucrative drug trade. He is considered to be the inventor of the racketeering string of houses in the Vasto suburb, as well as the common codes used for drugs. For instance, the matches are "slip" and doses are "bra".

== 1994 arrest and fugitive ==
In New Year's Eve, 1994, Contini was arrested by the Italian police during the New Year's celebrations at the chic ski resort at Cortina D'Ampezzo. He was convicted in 1996 of criminal association for illicit businesses, including clandestine betting operations. Contini was released in 2000 because his arrest warrant expired before his trial could be concluded. Shortly afterwards, he went into hiding while trials against him were still going on.

He is believed to have spent some of his years in hiding in Northern Europe, including Germany. He also maintained control of his clan from hiding, leading a vast criminal empire dealing in drugs, extortion, prostitution, money lending and illegal immigration. In 2005, he was sentenced in absentia to 20 years in jail for Camorra association and extortion. He has also been accused of murder. The Neapolitan daily Il Mattino reported that Contini had begun to recycle money through jewellery stores in Naples. Contini also recycled money through a casino in Venice, where his clan led mainly checks and pretending to change them having to pay in exchange for tokens to use for the game and mask as winnings.

Contini took extraordinary measures to ensure that he was never re-arrested. To avoid detection, he never left a place for months, keeping fit on a treadmill and watching satellite TV. He avoided using phones or the internet, instead issuing orders through small hand written notes called Pizzini, which he handed to visiting subordinates. In a further effort to evade detection, he only visited his wife Maria Aiata during Christmas. He never saw his two-month-old grandson. He even avoided sending clothes out for laundry by ordering in a constant supply of clean underwear, never wearing the same underwear twice. His weekly regimen included chicken with potatoes, steak and salad and ricotta cheese with rocket. He never had desserts. In the corner of his room was a running machine, and a 32-inch television with a Sky subscription.

== Capture ==
After spending seven years in hiding, Contini's whereabouts were discovered through a conversation overheard by police bugs. In the bugged conversation, Contini talked about his low-fat diet and gave detailed instructions on the food to be brought to him by an elderly woman who was on his payroll and whose six children lived with him in the same building. When the police burst into Contini's flat in the outskirts of Naples, he was having dinner with his neighbors. After a failed attempt to leap out into a balcony from a window, he gave himself up and was promptly arrested by the police officers. While under arrest, Contini complimented officers on their detective work by calling them "brave".

The Reuters news agency reported that large quantities of underwear and socks, as well as a wardrobe of designer clothing had been found in the flat where Contini was hiding. The police also found numerous small pizzini in the flat, which they later used to make further arrests. On Contini's arrest, the president of the parliamentary Anti-Mafia commission, Francesco Fragione commented:

The State marks an important point in its favor in the fight against the Camorra organizations that each day are trying to continue to impose their violent regime in the Neapolitan territory. Contini has built one of the most violent and dangerous cartels and his arrest is a success which shows that all the territories in the hunt for fugitives go forward with great efforts of investigators.
