= Alfieri clan =

- Founded: 1960s
- Founded by: Carmine Alfieri
- Founding location: Nola
- Years active: 1960s-1990s
- Territory: Various neighborhoods in Naples, Nola, Saviano.
- Ethnicity: Campanian
- Criminal activities: Racketeering, political corruption, drug trafficking, loan sharking, money laundering, extortion, murder
- Allies: Casalesi clan Galasso clan (defunct); Russo clan Anastasio clan Moccia clan Cava Clan; Cesarano clan
- Rivals: Nuova Camorra Organizzata; Nuvoletta clan Gionta clan

The Alfieri clan was a Neapolitan Camorra clan operating on the north-east of Naples, with its sphere of influence in the municipalities of Saviano and Nola.

== History ==
The association between the two Alfieri brothers, Salvatore and Carmine was formed after their father's murder in Tore Notaio in 1952. They swore to avenge his death and three years later, in 1956, Salvatore Alfieri killed their father's murderer at the social circle of Saviano. Salvatore later was murdered in an ambush at a restaurant in Pompeii by Raffaele Cutolo's Nuova Camorra Organizzata gunmen.

The loss of his brother and father pushed Carmine into becoming the head of the clan and to gain a position of dominance in the area of Nola. He was an important founding member of the Nuova Famiglia alliance (NF) that was formed to contrast the growing power of Raffaele Cutolo's Nuova Camorra Organizzata (NCO) in the early eighties. The internal infighting between the Casalesi and Nuvoletta clans eventually culminated in the massacre at Torre Annunziata on August 26, 1984, when at least 14 people on board a bus and two cars entered the circle of fishermen and opened fire, killing 7 persons belonging to the Gionta clan and wounding 7 others.

After the defeat of the NCO, the clan became extremely powerful at an increasing pace that continued into the late 1980s. In the mid-1980s, the Alfieri clan expanded its hegemony in the province of Naples in different directions towards Pomigliano d'Arco, Agro Nocerino Sarcese along the coastline between Castellamere di Stabia and Torre Annunziata and into the Vesuvius area in the municipalities of Somma Vesuviana, Sant'Anastasia and Volla.

He also made new alliances with the Galasso clan from Poggiomarino, Anastasio clan from Sant'Anastasia, Moccia clan from Afragola, Vangone-Limelli clan from Torre Annunziata and other emerging personalities such as Fernando Cesarano and Luigi Muollo from Castellamere di Stabia, Biagio Cava from Quindici, Ciro D'Auria from Sant'Antonio Abate and Angelo Lisciano from Boscoreale.

In 1993, after his power was undermined by the testimony of his former ally Pasquale Galasso, Carmine Alfieri himself became a pentito and went on to make devastating revelations against various Camorra clans and figures as well as various local politicians. In 2002 and 2004, his son and brother, Antonio and Francesco, were murdered due to his collaboration with the authorities.
