= Raffaele Amato =

Italian Camorrista and head of the Amato-Pagano clan

- Mugshot of Raffaele Amato taken after his 2005 arrest
- Born: 11 November 1965 (age 60); Naples, Italy
- Other names: "Lo Spagnolo" (The Spaniard), "'o Lell", "Lell o' chiatt'" (Lell the Fat), "'a vecchiarella"
- Spouse: Ermelinda Pagano
- Allegiance: Amato-Pagano clan / Camorra
- Penalty: 20 years

Raffaele Amato (born November 11, 1965 in Naples) is an Italian Camorra boss and head of the Amato-pagano clan, a Camorra clan from Naples. He is known by multiple nicknames in the Neapolitan criminal underworld, including "Lo Spagnolo" (The Spaniard), "'o Lell", "Lell o' chiatt'" (Lell the Fat One) and "'a vecchiarella".

== Background ==
Amato's clan was known as the "Scissionisti di Secondigliano" (English: "Splinters" of Secondigliano), because their clan was created after their split from the Di Lauro clan. In addition to that name, they are also known as "Spagnoli" (Spaniards) because of their historical presence in Spain, in particular in Costa del Sol and Barcelona. Amato, Cesare Pagano and his clan were once a faction within the Di Lauro clan, headed by Paolo Di Lauro. However, after Di Lauro became a wanted fugitive in 2002 and his son Vincenzo's arrest in 2004, Cosimo Di Lauro took charge of the clan. Cosimo wanted to centralize the drug dealing operation that had been run as a franchise in which dealers paid the Di Lauros a fee for doing business and were allowed to buy the drugs from any available source. He also removed older gangsters and replaced them with young toughs new to the business.

== Split ==
In defiance, Amato later split from the Di Lauro clan in October 2004, disputed the new rules, fled to Spain and organized a revolt against his former bosses. From there, he tried to assert the Scissionisti's control over drugs and prostitution rackets in the areas, that included Secondigliano and Scampia as its nerve centres. The war, known as the Scampia feud (Italian "faida di Scampìa"), resulted in over 60 murders in 2004 and 2005. The feud caused widespread public revulsion against the Camorra and led to a major crackdown by the authorities.

== Arrests ==
=== 2005 ===
On February 26, 2005, Amato was arrested along with five other clan members by the Catalan police while leaving a casino in Barcelona. His arrest came one month after that of his arch-enemy and former boss Cosimo Di Lauro. Amato was eventually extradited to Italy, where he had been accused of murder and drug trafficking. The Italian Interior minister, Giuseppe Pisanu hailed his capture as "a signal to the people of Naples that we are winning the fight against the Mafia". He stated that his capture meant the two Camorra factions blamed for the spate of killings in Naples have both been decapitated. Furthermore, Pisanu urged more witnesses to break Omertà, the Camorra code of silence and step forward with evidence.

In 2006, he was released because the limits of his temporary arrest expired. He became a fugitive again.

=== 2009 ===
On February 26, 2009, Amato was arrested in the Spanish city of Barcelona in a joint operation between Italian and Spanish police. Prior to his arrest he had been living under a false name on the Costa del Sol. He is accused of eight homicides between 1991 and 1993 during the so-called Mugnano feud, and of being "the principal, or one of the principal importers of cocaine into Italy".

He was extradited to Italy and received a 20-year jail sentence on May 19, 2010, in the trial against 48 members of the Amato-Pagano clan. He was charged with Mafia association, drug and arms trafficking and money laundering. He will be stripped of €20 million in assets in property, businesses and bank accounts in Italy, Spain and Monaco.
