= Paolo Di Lauro =

Italian crime boss (born 1953)

- Born: 26 August 1953 (age 73); Naples, Italy
- Other name: Ciruzzo 'o milionario
- Spouse: Luisa D'Avanzo (sister of affiliate Enrico D'Avanzo)
- Children: Ten sons and one daughter, including Marco and Cosimo
- Status: Imprisoned since 2005
- Allegiance: Di Lauro clan / Camorra
- Criminal charges: drug trafficking; Mafia association
- Penalty: 30 years

Paolo Di Lauro (Italian pronunciation: [ˈpaːolo di ˈlauro]; born 26 August 1953) is an Italian crime boss, leader of the Di Lauro Clan, a Camorra crime organization. He is also known as Ciruzzo 'o milionario (Neapolitan for 'Ciruzzo the millionaire') among other aliases. In 2002, he was included in the list of most wanted fugitives in Italy and was captured in September 2005.

== Biography ==
=== Early years ===
Di Lauro hailed from the Secondigliano neighbourhood, a north-eastern suburb of Naples. For years, he had been the obedient underling of one of the Camorra bosses, Aniello La Monica. He was present at a summit meeting of mafiosi in the early 1980s, when his boss parleyed with Sicilian Mafia boss Michele Greco. Di Lauro was among the mourners after La Monica was murdered in 1982, when the shopkeepers of Secondigliano hauled down their shutters as a sign of respect. Di Lauro's grief was in no way diminished by the fact that, as several supergrasses (informers) have since claimed, he was implicated in his boss's murder.

He was arrested for the first time in 1982, during a Camorra summit in the Neapolitan neighbourhood of Forcella, with other members of the Giuliano clan. At the time, Di Lauro was affiliated with the so-called "Nuova Fratellanza" (New Brotherhood), a gang included in the "Nuova Famiglia" (New Family) which fought against the "Nuova Camorra Organizzata" (New Organized Camorra) of Raffaele Cutolo o prufessore ("the professor"). In 1990s the Di Lauro clan was involved in a struggle with the Ruocco Clan from Mugnano. In 2000s Paolo Di Lauro was wanted in connection with the distribution of cocaine and other drugs, imported from South America into Italy and especially in the Neapolitan neighbourhoods of Scampìa and Secondigliano.

=== Drug trafficker ===
Di Lauro, the head of the Camorra clan that ran the northern suburbs, presided over a tightly managed drug empire that imported cocaine and heroin and distributed it through an army of dealers. In exchange for the monopoly and steady cuts of the proceeds, Di Lauro granted neighbourhood ringleaders a certain amount of autonomy.

Despite a niggling and semi-permanent feud with nearby Licciardi clan, Di Lauro kept his couriers – "the Spaniards" as they are widely known because of their endless trips ferrying cocaine from Galicia in Spain – and his street pushers and the other components of his empire under brutally tight control. Di Lauro's drug revenue from all his sellers is reckoned by Italian investigators to be worth about €200 million per year. He funnelled the proceeds into real estate, buying dozens of flats in Naples, owning shops in France and the Netherlands, as well as businesses importing fur, fake fur and lingerie.

=== Scampìa feud ===
In 2004, a Camorra war broke out between the Di Lauro clan and the so-called "secessionists" (Italian "scissionisti") led by Raffaele Amato, a breakaway fraction from the once all-powerful Di Lauro clan in the northern suburbs of Naples that tried to assert its control over drugs and prostitution rackets in the area. The war, known as the Scampia feud (Italian "faida di Scampìa"), resulted in over 60 murders in 2004 and 2005. The feud caused widespread public revulsion against the Camorra and led to a major crackdown by the authorities, resulting in the capture and imprisonment of Paolo Di Lauro and his sons Ciro (b. 1978) and Cosimo (b. 1973) and many of his associates.

=== Arrest and conviction ===
On 16 September 2005, police arrested Di Lauro in a modest apartment in Secondigliano, on the city's economically depressed northern outskirts. He was condemned to 30 years for drug trafficking.

After Di Lauro's son Cosimo was picked up in January 2005, his photograph began showing up as decoration on the mobile cellphones of young people in Naples.
