= Luigi Giuliano =

Italian crime boss

- Born: 3 November 1949 (age 77); Naples, Italy
- Other names: "'o rre" (the king) "Lovigino"
- Known for: Former head of the Giuliano clan
- Status: Pentito
- Allegiance: Giuliano clan / Camorra

Luigi Giuliano (Italian: [luˈiːdʒi dʒuˈljaːno]; born 3 November 1949) is a former Italian Camorrista who was the boss of the powerful Giuliano clan based in the district of Forcella, Naples. He had multiple nicknames, including "'o rre" (the king) and "Lovigino", which is an amalgamation of Luigi and love. In 2002, he decided to collaborate with Italian law enforcement and became a pentito, a cooperating witness against organised crime.

== Early life ==
Giuliano was born into the family of Pio Vittorio Giuliano, a well-known smuggler. Pio Vittorio Giuliano had 11 children. Six boys, Luigi "o re or the king", Guglielmo "o stuorto or the crooked one", Nunzio Giuliano, Carmine "o lione or the lion" (1952-2004), Salvatore "o montone or the ram", Raffaele "o zui", Neapolitan slang for being the youngest son. The other four girls, Erminia Giuliano, who was called Celeste, Patrizia, Silvana and Anna. Nunzio dissociated himself from the Camorra and, by extension, his own family in the 1980s, following the drug-related death of his son. In later years, he fought to keep young people away from the Camorra and was about to publish a book containing numerous interviews and anti-Camorra appeals which were directed towards the people of Campania, before he was killed on 21 March 2005.

At the age of 14, Giuliano stole a car belonging to an American expatriate together with Giuseppe Misso, the future boss of the Misso clan. His father found a briefcase containing hundreds of US dollars in the car. Pio Vittorio Giuliano was a powerful member of the Giuliano clan, which had traditionally controlled the Forcella, or "Casbah" area in the centre of Naples. Luigi Giuliano replaced his father as head of the clan in the mid-1970s.

== War with the NCO ==
The Giuliano clan was on such bad terms with rival mobster Michele Zaza that it launched an attack against his nephew Pasquale in December 1979. The Giuliano clan had been in good terms with the Nuova Camorra Organizzata, headed by Raffaele Cutolo, until the first half of 1979, but the two clans then broke out into conflict. Cutolo demanded to receive a cut from the Giulianos' illegal gambling centres and lottery system in his power base of Portici. Following this, the Vollaro clan leader named Luigi Vollaro raised the idea of an anti-Cutolo alliance with Giuliano. A provisional death squad was set up, which contributed to the dozens of gangland deaths that year.

The breaking point was reached when the NCO tried to move into the Giulianos' stronghold of Forcella, Piazza Mercato and Via Duomo, in the centre of Naples. A few days before Christmas 1980, two NCO members presented themselves at an unloading of contraband cigarettes at Santa Lucia and demanded immediate payment of $400,000 to their organization, as well as insisting on future payment of $25 for every crate of cigarettes brought ashore. They then proceeded to shoot and injure one of the Giuliano gang members while unloading the cigarettes. On Christmas Eve, Luigi Giuliano himself was wounded in an attack.

== Nuova Famiglia ==
The clash, which had occurred in a period of growing tension, led to the formation of the Nuova Famiglia (NF) to oppose Cutolo’s predominant NCO, consisting of Giuliano, Zaza, the Nuvolettas and Antonio Bardellino from Casal Di Principe (the Casalesi clan). After the defeat of Cutolo, the leaders of the NF achieved absolute dominance over all criminal rackets in the city of Naples. Luigi Giuliano relinquished control of the Quartieri Spagnoli (Spanish Quarters) to the Di Biase brothers, Luigi and Mario, who ruled the area under the approval of Giuliano. He later became a founding member of the Secondigliano Alliance, a consortium of Camorra clans formed in Naples towards the end of the 1980s.

== Arrest ==
Luigi Giuliano held the reins of his clan undisturbed for nearly thirty years. However, he was arrested in early 2000 and was succeeded by his sister, Erminia, who was ranked as one of Italy's 30 most dangerous criminals, and eventually arrested after being a fugitive for over 10 months. She became the boss because the only direct male heir to the family business still unimprisoned, Giuliano's nephew Pio Vittorio Giuliano, was deemed inept.

In January 2001, his wife, Carmela Marzano, was arrested and charged with threatening the widow of Giuseppe Ginosa, a rival Camorrista. She wanted to testify against Giuliano's son-in-law and two associates, accused of murdering her husband in 1999. Their daughter, Marianna, was also arrested.

== Pentito ==
In September 2002, Giuliano decided to collaborate with the Italian authorities and became a government witness. He cited his willingness to change his life as a reason for his collaboration with the authorities. The former boss revealed many secrets and details, which opened several branches of investigation, some of which are still ongoing. The information divulged featured corrupt police officers, corrupt judges, rigged auction houses, and complacent courts. He even made several statements against his former ally, Giuseppe Misso, and revealed specific details regarding the murder of the Vatican's banker Roberto Calvi, who was found hanging from scaffolding beneath Blackfriars Bridge in the financial district of London in 1982.

Luigi Giuliano's collaboration with the Italian authorities was preceded by that of his two brothers, Guglielmo and Raffaele. In retaliation for the defection of the three Giuliano brothers, Nunzio Giuliano was killed by the Camorra during an ambush at the Via Tasso in Naples in 2005, followed by Luigi Giuliano's son Giovanni on December 7, 2006. Giovanni had previously refused to join the Witness Protection program.

== Sources ==
- Behan, Tom (1996). The Camorra, London: Routledge, ISBN 0-415-09987-0
- Luigi Di Fiore, Potere camorrista, Alfredo Guida Editore, Napoli, 1993; ISBN 88-7188-084-6
- Cronache di Napoli.
