= Mallardo clan =

Camorra clan in Italy

- Founded: Late 1970s
- Founded by: Francesco Mallardo
- Founding location: Giugliano in Campania
- Years active: 1970s-present
- Territory: Giugliano in Campania, Qualiano and Villaricca.
- Criminal activities: Racketeering smuggling extortion drug trafficking
- Allies: Licciardi clan Contini clan Casalesi clan Cesarano clan Polverino clan Catania Mafia family

The Mallardo clan is a Camorra clan operating from the town of Giugliano in Campania, north of the city of Naples. The Mallardo clan is also one of the clans that belongs to the Secondigliano Alliance, that is considered by the authorities as the most powerful Camorra group that is still active.

== History ==
The clan was founded by Francesco Mallardo, son of Domenico Mallardo, a small-time cigarette smuggler, who was murdered outside his home in Giugliano, near Piazza Annunziata, on 2 August 1967. According to later statements from justice collaborators, the killing was carried out by one of the sons of Alfredo Maisto, the dominant Camorra boss in the northern Naples area, along with two accomplices. Francesco Mallardo and his younger brother Giuseppe were still teenagers and left fatherless. Francesco, soon entered a life of crime, starting with petty thefts, later moving on to robberies and prostitution rings. Giuseppe initially tried to pursue an honest living by working in an upholstery shop, but he too would eventually be drawn into the criminal world. In the early 1970s, Francesco Mallardo, known as Ciccio 'e Carlantonio, began expanding his criminal activities beyond his hometown of Giugliano in Campania, after failing to assert dominance there. He moved into the Vasto and Arenaccia neighborhoods of Naples, where he developed close ties with influential underworld figures such as Edoardo Contini and Patrizio Bosti, relationships strengthened by family ties through marriage to the Aieta sisters. He also formed a crucial alliance with Gennaro Licciardi of Secondigliano, a figure who would later co-found the Secondigliano Alliance.

The rise of this clan in both power and prominence is inextricably linked to the Licciardi and Contini clans. The three clans together formed a coalition called the Secondigliano Alliance, in order to gain a stranglehold in the drug trafficking and extortion rackets in Naples and dominated the Neapolitan underworld during the 1990s. Mallardo was soon added to the list of thirty most dangerous fugitives in Italy and eventually arrested in August 2003.

On May 10, 2011, the Italian police seized assets worth 600 million euros allegedly belonging to the Mallardos. The assets included around 900 properties, 23 companies and 200 bank accounts. Several people suspected of being members of the clan were arrested, such as Feliciano Mallardo, known as, the suspected boss. "The clan's companies had seized control of entire economic sectors: from the production and distribution of coffee to betting shops to the wholesale trade in drinks and pharmaceutical products," according to the police.

In May 2015, Feliciano Mallardo, known as ‘o sfregiato’, cousin of Francesco Mallardo, and a key figure in the Mallardo clan, has died in the hospital of L’Aquila prison after battling cancer. Arrested in 2011 for mafia-related crimes and held under the strict 41-bis regime, Mallardo was transferred to the prison hospital due to his illness.

On November 21, 2019, Feliciano Mallardo (not to be confused with his cousin with the same name), brother of Giuseppe and Francesco, was found dead inside his car. According to the investigations, he had suffered a heart attack. Feliciano had taken the reins of the organization after his brothers ended up in jail.

On April 29, 2020, the Italian police seized €50 million belonging to the clan. The measure concerns a total of 112 properties, 15 companies, numerous bank accounts, 4 luxury cars and 2 horse stables. The seized properties included hotels, restaurants and bathing establishments.

=== Recent events ===
In 2023 a major anti-mafia operation involving over 200 officers from Italy's Anti-Mafia Directorate targeted a criminal network controlling the fruit and vegetable trade and transportation services across central and southern Italy. The operation, linked to previous investigations "Sud Pontino" and "Store," led to numerous arrests and the seizure of 10 transport companies and assets worth 100 million euros. The Mallardo and Casalesi clans in an alliance with the Catania Mafia family of the Cosa Nostra, had established violent control over key wholesale markets in Fondi and Giugliano. Despite earlier crackdowns in 2010, the criminal influence had gradually re-emerged, culminating in recent violent incidents such as the shooting of Domenico Panico, a transporter tied to the Mallardo clan, signaling internal power struggles within the criminal networks.

Francesco Mallardo, the found and historical boss of the clan, died on the morning of 29 May 2025, at the age of 74. He died in a clinic in Parma, where he was under house arrest serving a 30-year prison sentence. Due to health issues, he had recently been transferred to a rehabilitation facility in Parma shortly before his death.

== See also ==
- Camorra
- List of members of the Camorra
- Licciardi clan
- List of Camorra clans
- Casalesi clan
- Contini clan
- Secondigliano Alliance
