= Scampia feud =

Feud between Camorra gangs

The Scampia feud (Italian: La faida di Scampia) or First Scampia feud (Prima faida di Scampia) was a feud between the Camorra gangs in the Neapolitan quartiere of Scampia which broke out in 2004 and 2005. The fight was between the Di Lauro clan, from Secondigliano, and the so-called "secessionists" (Scissionisti di Secondigliano), a breakaway faction in the northern suburbs of Naples that tried to assert its control over drugs and prostitution rackets in the area.

Paolo Di Lauro, head of the Camorra clan that runs the northern suburbs, was in charge of a tightly managed drug empire that imported cocaine and heroin and distributed it through an army of dealers. Di Lauro granted neighborhood ringleaders a certain amount of autonomy in exchange for the monopoly and cuts of the proceeds. He went into hiding on September 23, 2002, as authorities closed in. He left the business to Vincenzo Di Lauro, one of his ten sons. After the first arrest of Vincenzo on April 1, 2004, Cosimo Di Lauro took charge.

Cosimo Di Lauro wanted to centralize the drug-dealing operation that had been run as a franchise in which dealers paid the Di Lauros a fee for doing business and were allowed to buy the drugs from any available source. The young Di Lauro removed older gangsters and replaced them with young criminals new to the business. In revolt, a faction now known as the "secessionists" challenged the Di Lauros in October 2004. One of the local dealers, Raffaele Amato, disputed the new rules, fled to Spain and organized a revolt against his former bosses. In Scampia, they are known as the Spaniards. On October 28, 2004, Raffaele Amato ordered the murders of Fulvio Montanino and Claudio Salierno, men who were fiercely loyal to Cosimo Di Lauro. During their funeral three days later, police arrested two men armed with machine guns who were planning to fire on the funeral procession. The two organizations fought each other with a brutality that stunned even hardened Carabinieri.

On November 21, 2004, 21-year-old Gelsomina Verde was abducted and brutally tortured, probably in an effort to get her to disclose the whereabouts of her former boyfriend, Gennaro Notturno, a Scissionisti clan member. The two had broken up weeks prior to her abduction. She was shot three times in the neck and her body put in a car that was set on fire.

Her death caused widespread public revulsion and led to a major crackdown by the authorities. The governor of the Campania region (of which Naples is the capital) Antonio Bassolino said: "This challenge must be met and the state must pay attention." Two days later, Home Secretary Giuseppe Pisanu dispatched 325 extra police to a city that already had a higher ratio of police to people than any other in the country. On the evening of December 7, 2004, an operation involving 1,500 police netted 52 suspected gangsters including Ciro Di Lauro.

His brother Cosimo Di Lauro was arrested on January 21, 2005, and the head of one of the rival organizations, Raffaele Amato, on February 26, 2005. On September 16, 2005, police arrested Paolo Di Lauro in a modest apartment in Secondigliano, on the city's poor northern outskirts. He was sentenced to 30 years for drug trafficking. Two weeks later Paolo Di Lauro publicly kissed Vincenzo Pariante – one of the bosses of the "secessionists" – during a session in court. Investigators interpreted the gesture as a sign that the feud had ended. However, murders continued into 2008. Vincenzo Licciardi, the reputed head of the so-called Secondigliano Alliance was arrested in February 2008. He had been on Italy's most wanted list since July 2004.

== Second Scampia feud ==
The second Scampia feud (Italian: Seconda faida di Scampia) was an internal conflict in the criminal organization of the Scissionisti di Secondigliano which lasted from August 2012 until December of the same year, with some murders linked to the feud occurring from 2013 to 2014.

== Popular culture ==
Author and journalist Roberto Saviano drew inspiration for his 2006 book Gomorrah from these events, and the book was adapted for the 2008 Italian movie Gomorrah and the spin-off five-season (2014–2021) Sky Atlantic TV series Gomorrah.
