= Di Lauro clan =

- Founded: 1982
- Founder: Paolo Di Lauro
- Founding location: Secondigliano
- Years active: 1982–present
- Territory: At its peak Secondigliano, Scampia, Miano, Marianella, Piscinola, Casavatore, Melito, Arzano, Villaricca, Mugnano in Italy; with other territories in France, Netherlands and Spain
- Leader: Vincenzo Di Lauro
- Activities: Murder, extortion, drug trafficking, smuggling, money laundering
- Allies: Secondigliano Alliance; Contini clan; Licciardi clan; Mallardo clan; Sacra Corona Unita; D'Alessandro clan Giuliano clan (defunct)
- Rivals: Scissionisti di Secondigliano; Ruocco clan Abbinante clan Sacco-Bocchetti clan

The Di Lauro clan (Italian pronunciation: [di ˈlauro]) is an Italian crime clan, part of the Camorra in Naples. The clan operates in the neighbourhoods of Secondigliano, Scampìa, Miano, Marianella, Piscinola, and in the adjacent municipalities of Casavatore, Melito, Arzano, Villaricca and Mugnano (all in the province of Naples). At its peak, between the mid-1990s and the early 2000s, the organisation was earning more than €500,000 a day from the sale of drugs alone, making Secondigliano the largest open-air drug market in Europe. The founder of the clan is Paolo Di Lauro (known as "Ciruzzo il milionario"), from Via Cupa dell'Arco, in Secondigliano.

== History ==
The Italian Direzione Distrettuale Antimafia ("Antimafia District Directorate") first investigated the clan in 2002, which led to the imprisonment of its most influential members, including Abbinante clan boss Raffaele "Papale e Marano" Abbinante, who was aligned with Di Lauro. However, Paolo Di Lauro managed to stay free. Despite this setback, the clan increased its power and the arrested members were replaced by several of Di Lauro's ten sons, including Cosimo (b. 1973), Ciro (b. 1978) and Marco (b. 1980). Their connections with other clans were strengthened in the Secondigliano Alliance. The clan's "old guard" lost its power, and some of Di Lauro's former allies formed a rival alliance (Scissionisti di Secondigliano) and started a bloody power struggle in 2004 known as the Scampia feud.

According to the Anti-mafia authorities reports made in 2021, much work had been done to weaken the organization. However, despite the arrests of most of its members, the clan was in fact making a comeback, shifting to an increasingly business-oriented model, and scaling back their involvement in extortion and other "street crimes". The Di Lauros would maintain their authority and economic solidity through recurrent remodeling of their internal structures but in particular in new methods of laundering money. The organization's new leadership, which, according to authorities, is now headed by one of the sons of Paolo Di Lauro, is investing mainly in the international smuggling of foreign manufactured tobaccos and at is relaunching their counterfeiting operations all over Europe.

== Activities ==
In the early 2000s, the clan's drug revenue was estimated by Italian investigators to be worth about €200 million per year. Under the rule of Paolo Di Lauro, Secondigliano, the clan's stronghold, became the largest open-air narcotics market in Europe.

The Di Lauro clan funneled the money into real estate, buying dozens of flats in Naples, shops in France and the Netherlands, as well as businesses importing fur, fake fur and lingerie. Cosimo Di Lauro sometimes travelled to Paris to control the business of the clan in France. The clan also produces counterfeit clothes in the Netherlands. According to the pentito Antonio Accurso, the Di Lauro clan also has ties to the Sacra Corona Unita and Ciro Contini, a member of the Contini Clan, regarding drug trafficking.

On 12 July 2019, the Italian police confiscated €300 million, including 600 properties, 16 vehicles and numerous bank accounts belonging to Antonio Passarelli, a businessman believed to be connected to the Di Lauro clan. Additionally, in October 2021, the Spanish police arrested a suspected member of the organization in Málaga, who was in charge of the tobacco smuggling activities for the organization in Spain.

== Leadership ==
- Paolo Di Lauro became a fugitive in 2002 and left the business to his sons Cosimo and Vincenzo Di Lauro (b. 1975).
- Cosimo Di Lauro, known as "The Designer Don", was arrested in 2005 and sentenced to life in prison. Cosimo died in prison in June 2022.
- Marco Di Lauro was arrested in Naples on 2 March 2019. Sentenced to life in prison.
- Nunzio Di Lauro, was arrested on 3 March 2008.
- According to the journalist Roberto Saviano, after Marco's arrest, the new leaders of the organisation were Vincenzo and Ciro Di Lauro.
- Ciro Di Lauro was first arrested in late 2004. In February 2022, he was rearrested, accused of two murders that took place in 2004.
- Vincenzo Di Lauro was arrested in March 2007. As of 2021, Vincenzo Di Lauro is under house arrest.
- Salvatore Di Lauro, known as Terremoto (Earthquake), despite having a history of going back and forth to prison, was released from jail in September 2021.

== Codes of conduct ==
In the years when Paolo Di Lauro was in charge of the clan, he decreed several orders of conduct for his affiliates, among them, that it was forbidden to assassinate each other for economic reasons, if there were economic problems among the members or affiliates, a meeting of the organization's top management was called for a negotiation. Another rule was in relation to the constant territorial wars between the Camorra clans: in the Di Lauro clan, it was not allowed to assassinate members of rival clans for this reason, unless the entire chamber formed by all the clan leaders gave authorization to do so. The clan however is quite strict about extramarital affairs of its members and courting the partner of its members or affiliates. In this case, the murder of those who broke one of these two rules is allowed.

== In popular culture ==
- Gomorrah (TV series) Inspired in the Di Lauro clan and in their war against the Scissionisti di Secondigliano led by Raffaele Amato.

== See also ==
- List of members of the Camorra
- List of Camorra clans
- Marco Di Lauro
- Paolo Di Lauro
- Cosimo Di Lauro
- List of most wanted fugitives in Italy
- Camorra
