= Scissionisti di Secondigliano =

Camorra clan from the Secondigliano district of Naples

- Founded: 2004
- Founded by: Raffaele Amato
- Founding location: Secondigliano
- Years active: 2004–present
- Territory: Italy: Secondigliano, Scampia, Miano, Marianella, Piscinola, Casavatore, Melito, Arzano, Villaricca Mugnano; Spain: Costa del Sol, Barcelona and Galicia
- Criminal activities: Murder, extortion, drug trafficking, smuggling, money laundering
- Allies: Lo Russo clan (defunct); Russo clan (from the QS); Bizzarro clan Lepre clan Ruocco clan 'Ndrangheta
- Rivals: Di Lauro clan Vanella Grassi clan (Girati); Former allies: Abbinante clan Pariante clan Notturno clan Marino clan

The Scissionisti di Secondigliano or Amato-Pagano clan is a Camorra clan from the Secondigliano district of Naples, headed by Raffaele Amato and Cesare Pagano. They are also known as "Spagnoli" (Spaniards) because of their strong presence in Spain, particularly in Costa del Sol and Barcelona.

After the end of the war against the Di Lauro clan, the group fell apart, starting a violent internal war. In the present day the Scissionisti di Secondigliano are known as the Amato-Pagano clan. Currently, the organization is one of the most important in the entire Camorra in terms of international drug trafficking.

== History ==
Raffaele Amato split from the Di Lauro clan and tried to assert the Scissionisti's control over drugs and prostitution rackets in the areas, that included Secondigliano and Scampia. Amato aligned himself with several Sistema leaders, as the Camorra is known in Naples, which included Gennaro Marino and Arcangelo Abete. The war, known as the Scampia feud (Italian "faida di Scampìa"), resulted in over 100 murders in 2004 and 2005. The feud caused widespread public revulsion against the Camorra and led to a major crackdown by the authorities.

Secondigliano was historically controlled by the Di Lauro clan, whereas Scampia, Casavatore, Chiaiano, Marianella, Piscinola, Giugliano and Melito are under the control of the Scissionisti.

Raffaele Imperiale, one of the most important drug traffickers of Naples, and an important affiliate of the Amato-Pagano clan, was involved in large scale cocaine trafficking from the Netherlands. In the 1990s he was a member of the Di Lauro clan, but changed sides becoming an affiliate of the Scissionisti first and of the Amato-Pagano later. Imperiale worked in Amsterdam until 2008. In 2016, two Van Gogh paintings stolen from the Van Gogh Museum in Amsterdam in 2002 were recovered in a villa near Naples, owned by him. Imperiale was sentenced to 18 years in absentia for drug offenses.

== Leaders ==
- 2004—2009: Raffaele Amato — Arrested on April 17, 2009.
- 2004—2010: Cesare Pagano — Arrested on July 8, 2010. Serving a life sentence in prison.
- 2010—2014: Mariano Riccio — Arrested on February 4, 2014.
- 2014—2017: Rosaria Pagano — Sister of Cesare Pagano and widow of Pietro Amato, brother of Raffaele Amato. Arrested on January 17, 2017.
- 2017—present: Emanuele Amato — Nephew of Raffaele Amato.
- 2017—present: Liguori Marco

== Historical allies ==
In addition to the faction commanded by the Amato-Pagano, other clans were most often included in the "Scissionisti di Secondigliano", such as:

- Abbinante clan (Marano) -
  - Boss: Raffaele Abbinante, a.k.a. "Papale e Marano", brothers Antonio and Giudo, nephew Francesco (they were originally part of the Di Lauro clan, but were caught up in a 2002 sweep that jailed boss Raffaele, a former Di Lauro lieutenant. Then they aligned with the scissionisti).
- Notturno clan (Scampia) -
  - Boss: Raffaele Notturno and Gennaro Notturno a.k.a. "‘o sarracin" (Gennaro become a pentito and Raffaele is in jail).
- Abete clan (Scampia) -
  - Boss: Arcangelo Abete. (Currently serving a life sentence in prison.)
- Pariante clan (Bacoli, Monte di Procida) -
  - Boss: Rosario Pariante (Pariante was a former Di Lauro lieutenant, who split with the group joining the scissionisti alliance in late 2004).
- Marino clan (Case Celesti, Secondigliano) -
  - Boss: Gennaro Marino, a.k.a. "‘o McKay". Head of the military wing of the Scissionisti. Eventually, after the Scampia feud, the Marino clan went to war against the Scissionisti.

After the end of the feud against the Di Lauro clan, more precisely in 2012, most of the former groups that formed the "Scissionisti di Secondigliano" started an internal war, one example was the so-called "Second Scampia feud", a war waged between the Amato-Pagano clan against the Abete, Abbinante and Notturno clans.

== Current status ==
According to the Direzione Investigativa Antimafia, despite the arrests of important members of the organization, the Amato-Pagano clan continues to maintain the monopoly of drug trafficking and military control of the territory through extortion, having a leading role in the criminal activities in the north region of the city of Naples.

In March 2025, Antonio Pompilio, known as ‘o Cafone’ and a key figure of the Amato-Pagano clan, was extradited and arrested upon arrival at Rome Fiumicino Airport after being captured in Barcelona. He had previously escaped arrest during the large anti-mafia operation Champions League 2 conducted in Naples on November 12, 2024. Pompilio was located and arrested in Barcelona on January 17, 2025, by Naples’ investigative Carabinieri in cooperation with the Central Anti-Drug Services, International Police Cooperation Service, Europol, Spain’s National Police, and the Special Operations Group. He was extradited to Italy under an arrest warrant issued by the Preliminary Investigations Judge of Naples and was places in custody under the Naples Anti-Mafia Prosecutor’s Office. The Champions League 2 investigation identified 33 suspects charged with association aimed at drug trafficking, aggravated by the organization’s size, access to weapons, and direct ties to the Amato-Pagano clan. The inquiry revealed two distinct Naples-based criminal groups, functionally independent but sharing the same drug supply channel, mainly cocaine and hashish, managed through Spain. Pompilio’s arrest marks a significant step in disrupting the transnational drug trafficking network operated by the Amato-Pagano clan.

== In popular culture ==
- Gomorrah (TV series), inspired by the Di Lauro clan and in their war against the Scissionisti di Secondigliano led by Raffaele Amato.

== See also ==
- List of members of the Camorra
- List of Camorra clans
- List of most wanted fugitives in Italy

== Sources ==
- Roberto Saviano (2006). Gomorra - Viaggio nell'impero economico e nel sogno di dominio della camorra. Mondadori. ISBN 8804554509.
- Simone Di Meo (2008). L'impero della camorra - Vita violenta del boss Paolo Di Lauro. Newton Compton. ISBN 9788854109926.
- Mappa della camorra: ecco chi comanda in Italia e all’estero
