= Outline of Naples =

Overview of and topical guide to Naples

Flag of Naples

Coat of arms of Naples

The following outline is provided as an overview of and topical guide to Naples:

Naples – capital of the Italian region Campania and the third-largest municipality in Italy. Naples is one of the oldest continuously inhabited cities in the world. Naples has the fourth-largest urban economy in Italy, after Milan, Rome and Turin. It is the world's 103rd-richest city by purchasing power, with an estimated 2011 GDP of US$83.6 billion. The port of Naples is one of the most important in Europe, and has the world's second-highest level of passenger flow, after the port of Hong Kong.

== General reference ==
- Pronunciation: /ˈneɪpəlz/ NAY-pəlz; Italian: Napoli [ˈnaːpoli], Neapolitan: Napule [ˈnɑːpələ]; Latin: Neapolis; Ancient Greek: Νεάπολις
- Common English name(s): Naples
- Official English name(s): City of Naples
- Adjectival(s): Neapolitan
- Demonym(s): Neapolitan

== Geography of Naples ==
Geography of Naples

- Naples is:
  - a city
    - Capital of Campania
    - Capital of the Metropolitan City of Naples
- Population of Naples: 970,185
- Area of Naples:
- Atlas of Naples

=== Location of Naples ===
Naples (Italy)
- Naples is situated within the following regions:
  - Northern Hemisphere and Eastern Hemisphere
    - Eurasia
      - Europe (outline)
        - Western Europe
        - Southern Europe
          - Italian Peninsula
            - Italy (outline)
              - Southern Italy
                - Campania
                  - Metropolitan City of Naples
- Time zone(s): Central European Time (UTC+01), Central European Summer Time (UTC+02)

=== Environment of Naples ===
- Climate of Naples
- Naples waste management crisis

=== Landforms of Naples ===
- Islands of Naples
  - Campanian Archipelago
  - Phlegraean Islands

=== Areas of Naples ===
==== Municipalities of Naples ====
Municipalities of Naples – the 10 administrative divisions (boroughs) into which Naples is divided.

- 1st municipality of Naples
- 2nd municipality of Naples
- 3rd municipality of Naples
- 4th municipality of Naples
- 5th municipality of Naples
- 6th municipality of Naples
- 7th municipality of Naples
- 8th municipality of Naples
- 9th municipality of Naples
- 10th municipality of Naples

==== Neighborhoods in Naples ====
Neighborhoods in Naples (Quarters)

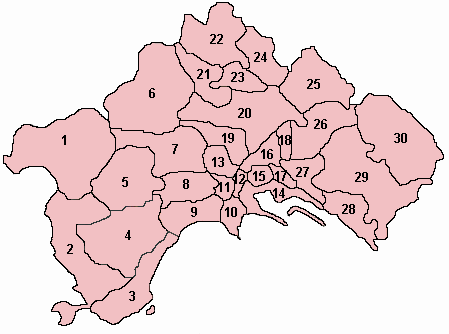
The quarters of Naples.

1. Pianura
2. Bagnoli
3. Posillipo
4. Fuorigrotta
5. Soccavo
6. Chiaiano
7. Arenella
8. Vomero
9. Chiaia
10. San Ferdinando

11. Montecalvario
12. San Giuseppe
13. Avvocata
14. Porto
15. Pendino
16. San Lorenzo
17. Mercato
18. Vicaria
19. Stella
20. San Carlo all'Arena

21. Piscinola
22. Scampia
23. Miano
24. Secondigliano
25. S.Pietro a Patierno
26. Poggioreale
27. Zona Industriale
28. San Giovanni a Teduccio
29. Barra
30. Ponticelli

=== Locations in Naples ===
==== Parks and zoos in Naples ====
- Villa Comunale
- Parco Virgiliano
- Parco Virgiliano (Mergellina)
- Botanical Garden
- Villa Floridiana
- Zoo di Napoli

=== Demographics of Naples ===
Demographics of Naples

== Government and politics of Naples ==
Government and politics of Naples

- Government of Naples
  - List of mayors of Naples

== History of Naples ==
History of Naples

- List of viceroys of Naples, Duke of Naples, List of monarchs of Naples
- Timeline of Naples
  - Neapolitan Renaissance
  - Bombing of Naples in World War II

=== History of Naples, by period ===
- Timeline of Naples

=== History of Naples, by subject ===
- Siege of Naples

== Culture of Naples ==
Culture of Naples

- Architecture of Naples, History of urban planning and architecture of Naples
  - List of tallest buildings in Naples
  - List of villas in Naples
  - List of palaces in Naples
  - Liberty in Naples
  - Fountains in Naples
  - Churches in Naples
  - Sacred newsstands of Naples
  - Cloisters of Naples
  - Monuments of Naples
  - Walls of Naples
- Cuisine of Naples
- Museums in Naples
- Historic Centre of Naples
- Catacombs of Naples
- Early theatres in Naples
- Neapolitan Baroque
- Symbols of Naples
  - Flag of Naples
  - Coat of arms of Naples

=== Art in Naples ===
- State Archives of Naples
- Neapolitan painting
  - Neapolitan painting of the seventeenth century
- Neapolitan theater

==== Cinema of Naples ====
- Cinema of Naples

==== Music of Naples ====
- Music of Naples
  - Canzone Napoletana
  - Neapolitan School
- List of radio stations in Naples

=== Religion in Naples ===
- Christianity in Naples
  - Bishop of Naples
  - Diocese of Naples
  - Catholicism in Naples
    - Roman Catholic Archdiocese of Naples
- Judaism in Naples
  - History of the Jews in Naples

== Economy and infrastructure of Naples ==
- Public services in Naples
  - Naples Police Department

=== Transportation in Naples ===
Transport in Naples

- Rail transit in Naples
  - Naples subway
    - List of Naples Metro stations
    - Art Stations of the Naples Metro
- Port of Naples

== Education in Naples ==
Education in Naples

- Public education in Naples
  - Universities in Naples
    - University of Naples

== See also ==
- Outline of geography
