= Via Dante, Naples =

Street in Naples, Italy

Via Dante
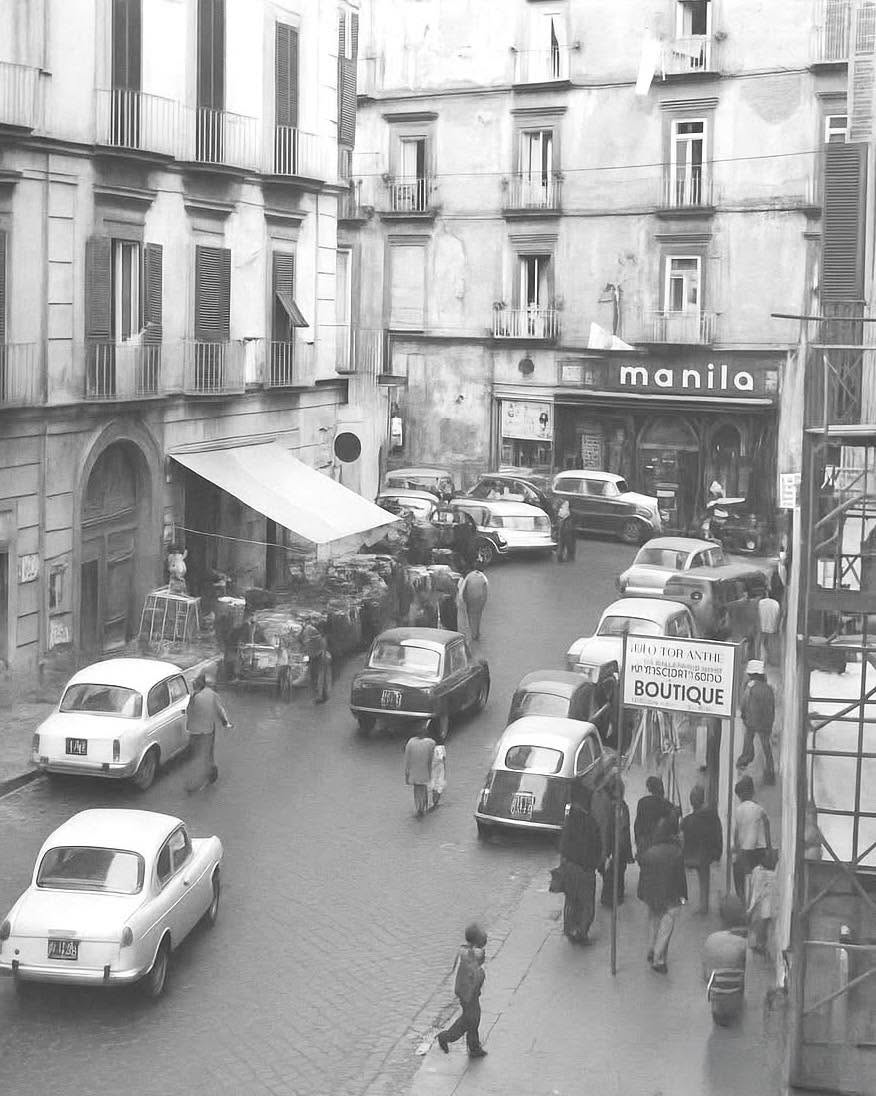
- Via Dante in the 1960s
- Interactive map of Via Dante
- Location: Naples, Italy
- Quarter: Secondigliano
- Postal code: 80144
- From: Via dell'Arco
- To: Corso Secondigliano

Via Dante is a historic street in Naples, Italy, in the Secondigliano quarter. It runs through the old core of the former village, the site of the district's traditional street market, and connects the area around Via dell'Arco with Corso Secondigliano.

== Description ==
The street begins at the junction of Via dell'Arco and Via San Gaetano Errico, the site of the church of the Addolorata, runs through the area of the district market, and continues to the junction with Corso Italia and Via Fosso del Lupo before joining Corso Secondigliano.

== History ==
=== Ficucella and Fosso del Lupo ===
The present street was formed by the joining of two older routes: the Ficucella, also known as the vinella di Basso Chiummo, and the first stretch of Via Fosso del Lupo. The first corresponded to the stretch on which the mother house of the Missionaries of the Sacred Hearts now stands, the second to the stretch running from the junction with the present-day Corso Italia to Corso Secondigliano.

The place name Fosso del Lupo occurs in notarial deeds and in the registers of pastoral visitations between the seventeenth and nineteenth centuries, referring to a plot of agricultural land owned by the parish, the proceeds of which were assigned to the upkeep of the clergy and, in part, to the dowries of poor girls of the village. In a report of 1679 the land surveyor Domenico Volpicella described its boundaries, referring to the public road called Fosso del Lupo; other sources record twenty-six moggia of land administered with the involvement of the Pio Monte della Misericordia and of local governors.

Along the route, next to the alleys of the old village core, stood the parish house of Don Michelangelo Vitagliano, a parish priest who died in 1858.

=== The Addolorata complex ===
At the upper end of the street, in the area straddling the junction with Via Padre Gaetano Errico, stands the mother house of the Missionaries of the Sacred Hearts of Jesus and Mary, founded in 1833 by Gaetano Errico, a native of Secondigliano. The complex includes the sanctuary of the Addolorata, blessed on 9 December 1830 and built with the offerings of local residents, where the saint's tomb is preserved along with the room in which he lived from 1833 until his death in 1860.

== See also ==
- Corso Secondigliano
