= Corso Secondigliano =

Street in Naples, Italy

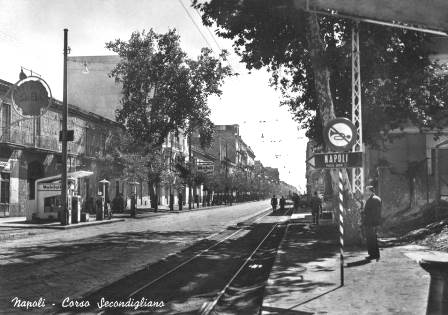
- Corso Secondigliano toward Piazza Giuseppe Di Vittorio. First half of the 20th century.
- Interactive map of Corso Secondigliano
- Former name: Corso Umberto I
- Length: 2.1 km (1.3 mi)
- Location: Secondigliano, 7th municipality of Naples (Naples)
- Postal code: 80144
- From: Piazza Giuseppe di Vittorio
- To: Quadrivio di Secondigliano, continuing as via Roma verso Scampia

Corso Secondigliano (formerly Corso Umberto I) is one of the most important historic streets of Naples, located in the quarter of Secondigliano. It is 2.1 kilometres long and connects the area to Capodichino and, from there, to the rest of the city.

The street begins at the so-called quadrivio di Secondigliano ("Secondigliano crossroads"), the junction where it meets via Napoli Capodimonte (leading toward the quarters of Miano and Capodimonte), via Comunale Limitone d'Arzano (leading toward the municipality of Arzano), and via Roma verso Scampia (leading toward the quarter of Scampia). Running through the entire district, it ends at Piazza Giuseppe Di Vittorio, on the southern edge of it.

== History ==
Corso Secondigliano has its origins in the context of the old rural settlement (casale) of Secondigliano. The street developed along a strategic route connecting Naples with the agricultural and rural centres to the north, facilitating the transport of produce such as fruit, wine, grain, and vegetables into the city. During the Bourbon period, the area saw the construction of villas and farmhouses, reflecting a phase of agricultural prosperity.

Until the 1920s, the thoroughfare was known as Corso Umberto I, in honour of King Umberto I of Italy, who was assassinated in 1900.

On 23 January 1996, the Quadrivio di Secondigliano, a key junction along the corso, was the site of a serious tragedy. During construction work on the Strada statale 87 NC, a gas leak caused an explosion, leading to the collapse of buildings and the opening of a sinkhole about 20 metres wide. The incident killed eleven people who are commemorated every year on 23 January by a torchlight procession.

== Description ==
Notable buildings along the street include Villa Alfiero, a historic Art Nouveau-style residence dating from the early 20th century, the row of five buildings belonging to the Barons Carbonelli di Letino, Palazzo Capasso Visconti, and Palazzo di Nocera, also linked to one of the aristocratic families once settled in the area. Other historic buildings, often once owned by local noble families, stand along the corso and in its immediate vicinity.

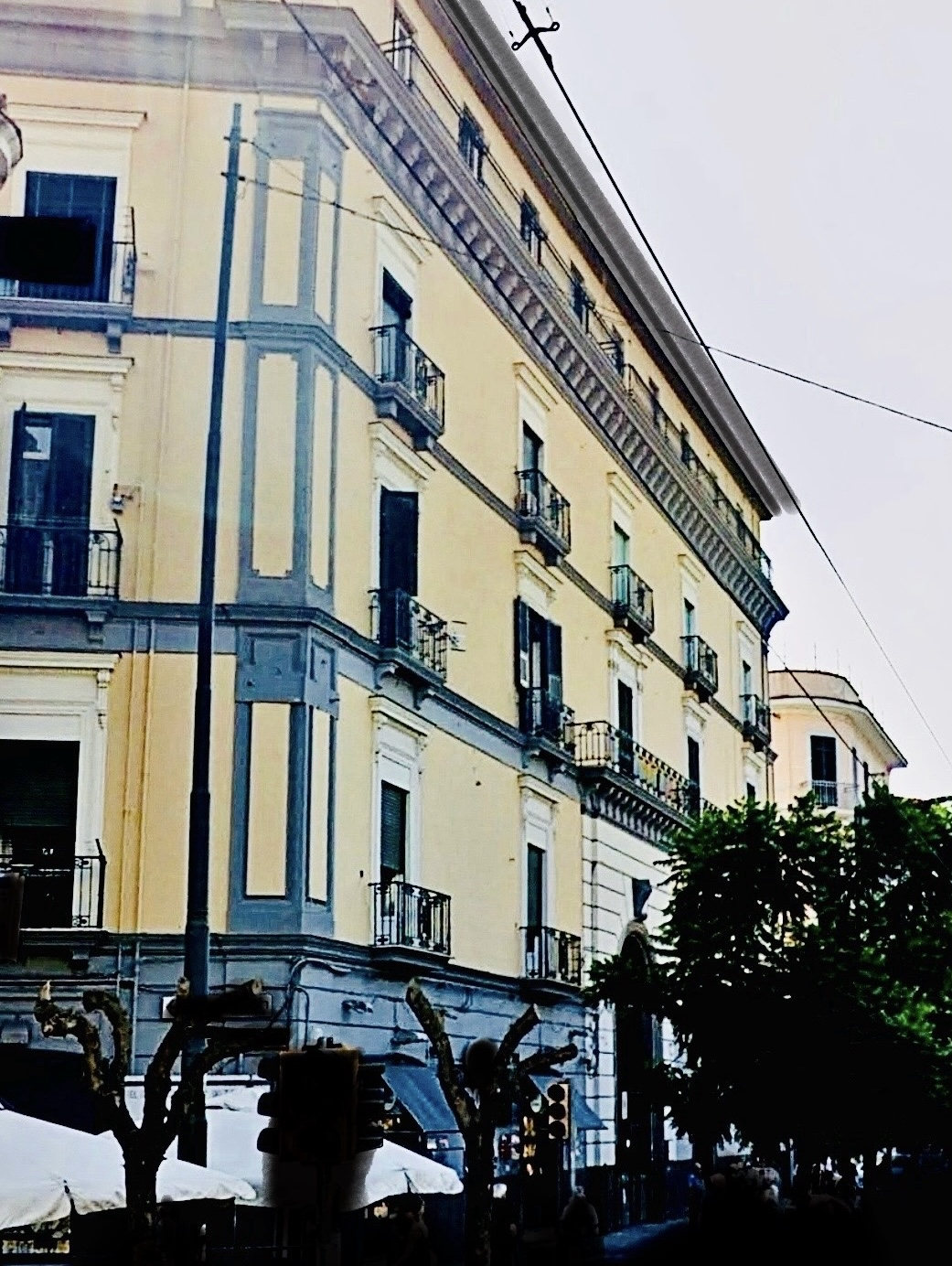
Palazzo di Nocera

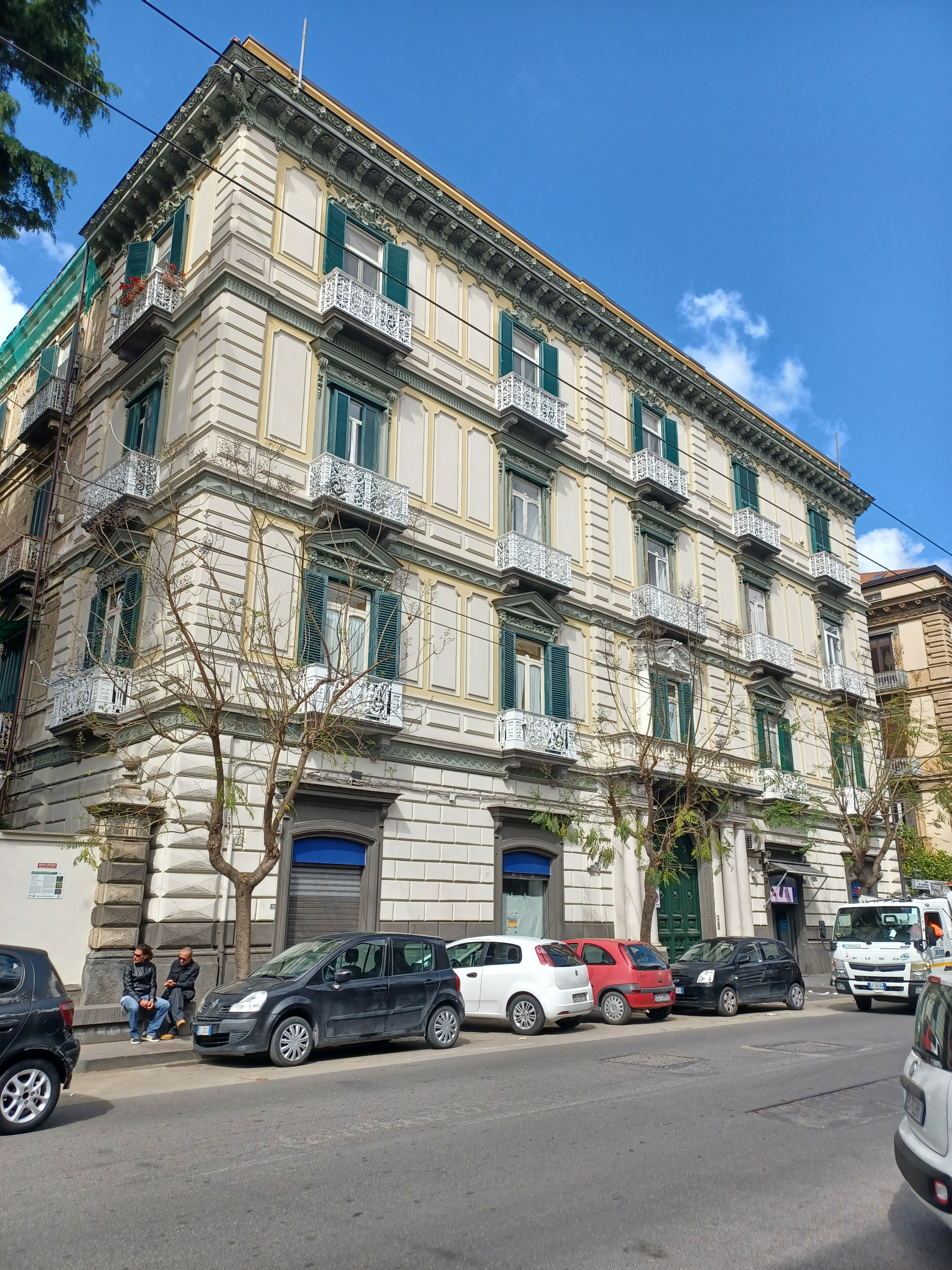
Palazzo Carbonelli di Letino, 487 of Corso Secondigliano

Today Corso Secondigliano is considered one of the city's main shopping streets. It hosts a wide variety of shops, in particular artisan clothing boutiques, shoe shops, homeware stores, and furniture shops, which draw residents and visitors from the surrounding districts.

It also includes the so-called 'Ncopp 'o ponte area, the junction between the corso and via Vittorio Emanuele, opposite via Regina Margherita.

== Bibliography ==
- Marrone, Romualdo. Le strade di Napoli. Newton Compton, 2004
