= Secondigliano tragedy =

1996 gas explosion in Naples, Italy

The Secondigliano tragedy, better known as the Secondigliano abyss, was a disaster in January 1996 involving gas leak explosion that occurred in Naples, on Corso Secondigliano, in the Secondigliano quarter, where a total of 11 people lost their lives.

== Background ==
For some time the Secondigliano crossroads had been involved in the construction works of the tunnel of the state road 87 NC from Miano to Arzano. Eight in all the workers who worked inside the tunnel for the company "Scarl Arzano".

== Event ==
At 4:20 pm on Tuesday 23 January 1996, inside the tunnel, a gas leak occurred which immediately caused a very strong explosion, due to the drilling of a methane gas pipe inside the tunnel. The explosion took the buildings of the crossroads in full, where the wing of a three-storey building, the latter with an eviction order issued just a few days earlier, collapsed, causing a massive fire and causing the all, opening a chasm about 30 m wide.

The chasm, of unusual width, destroyed the square: the fire that had affected the area of the crossroads made it completely impossible for rescuers to arrive, who managed to tame it only eight hours later, around 1:00 am on 24 January. In the morning the rescuers had to dig for a long time to try to rescue someone still alive under the burnt rubble, but no one was found alive.

It took a long time to rebuild the entire crossroads and to put the damaged buildings back in place, while instead, since then, the construction of the tunnel after the tragedy was interrupted and, to this day, work has not resumed.

== Victims ==
There were a total of 11 victims, 6 workers, 2 people in their cars, and 3 in the collapsed building. Two workers managed to get to safety, exiting the tunnel just before the explosion. The victims are Michele Sparaco, Alfonso Scala, Mario De Girolamo, Giuseppe Petrellese, Gennaro De Luca, Emilia Laudati, Francesco Russo, Pasquale Silvestro, Ciro Vastarella, Serena De Santis, Stefania Bellone While most bodies of the victims were recovered, only that of Stefania Bellone has never been found since then.

== Commemoration ==
The "Family Victims of the Secondigliano Tragedy" association was formed, formed precisely by the families of the victims of the disaster, who each time reaffirm justice for the victims, having only 20 arrests and 3 convictions. Every year, on 23 January at 4:20 pm, the time of the disaster, there is a torchlight procession in memory of the disaster.
