= Gaetano Errico =

Italian Roman Catholic saint (1791–1860)

Saint Gaetano Errico MSSCC
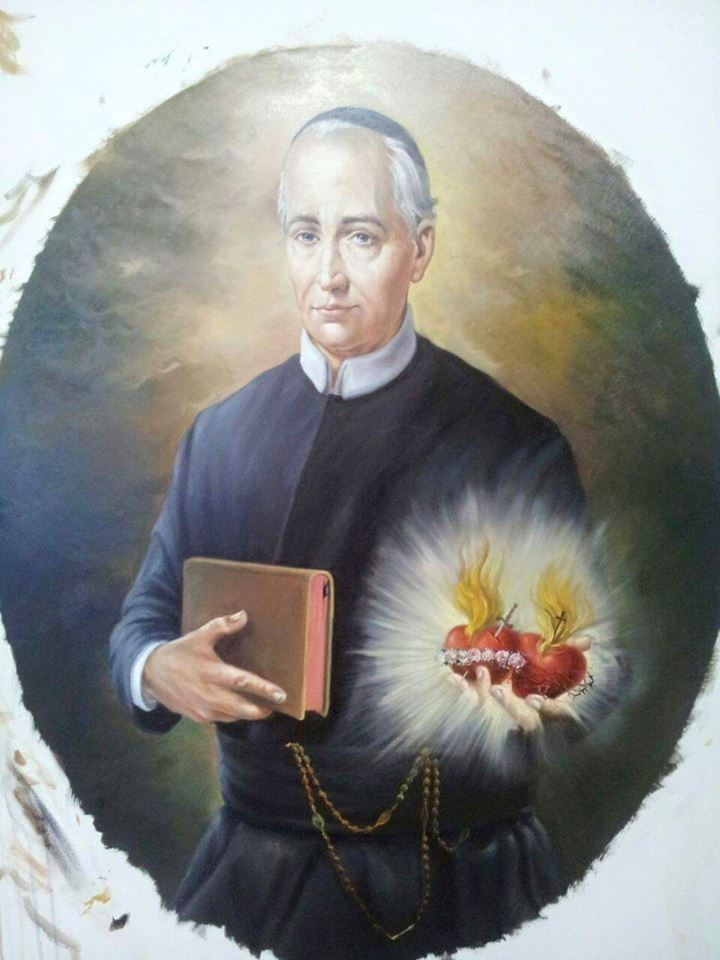

Priest
- Born: 19 October 1791; Secondigliano, Naples, Kingdom of Naples
- Died: 29 October 1860 (aged 69); Secondigliano, Naples, Kingdom of Italy
- Venerated in: Roman Catholic Church
- Beatified: 14 April 2002, Saint Peter's Square, Vatican City by Pope John Paul II
- Canonized: 12 October 2008, Saint Peter's Square, Vatican City by Pope Benedict XVI
- Feast: 29 October
- Attributes: Crucifix; Sacred Heart; Priest's cassock
- Patronage: Missionari dei Sacri Cuori di Gesù e Maria

Gaetano Errico, MSSCC (19 October 1791 – 29 October 1860) was an Italian Catholic priest from Naples and the founder of the Missionaries of the Sacred Hearts of Jesus and Mary.

Errico was born to devout and hardworking parents whose income was modest but sufficient for him to do his ecclesial studies in Naples. It was common for him to be seen twice a week tending to the ill despite his studies and he also helped his father on occasion at his warehouse. He became a teacher after his ordination and later a parish priest.

Errico became better known for having had a vision while on a retreat in 1818 in which Alphonsus Liguori came to him in a vision requesting he both found a religious congregation and oversee the establishment of a new church dedicated to the Blessed Mother. Errico did this despite several obstacles, though he did not see it through to the end until just over a decade later.

His canonization cause was introduced under Pope Leo XIII in 1884 and he became titled as a Servant of God; Pope Paul VI later named him as Venerable in 1974 upon confirming his heroic virtue while Pope John Paul II later beatified him on 14 April 2002. Pope Benedict XVI canonized Errico as a saint on 12 October 2008 in Saint Peter's Square.

== Life ==
Gaetano Errico was born on 19 October 1791 in Secondigliano in Naples as the second of nine children to Pasquale Errico (d. 28 March 1834; Good Friday) and Maria Marseglia (d. 19 April 1837); his parents were married on 17 April 1788 in the Saint Charles church. His father (who came from Miano but whose relations hailed from Frattamaggiore) managed a small pasta warehouse and his mother (who was born in Secondigliano) worked at the local loom weaving plush. Errico was a pious child having learnt the Christian faith from his devout parents whom he helped in their work or in the chores around the house. His nephew Beniamino Errico became a priest and two cousins were part of the Order of Friars Minor Capuchin as friars.

His mother once took him as a child to the Redemptorists to be blessed and the priest did this after having looked at the child, telling his mother: "This child will be a priest, a great preacher, he will be a saint and he will do good work in Secondigliano". Errico often aided his father at his warehouse where his father would sometimes lose his temper when under financial strain; he would sometimes slap Errico when he would lose his temper irrespective of whether or not Errico had behaved. The priests Giovanni Tagliamonte and Michelangelo Vitagliano were his teachers growing up and Vitagliano would later serve as Errico's confessor until Vitaglaino died. The parish priest Fr. Pumpo gave him his First Communion when he turned seven and he received his Confirmation on 2 January 1802 in the Naples Cathedral from Bishop Iorio; the priest Domenico Cafolla acted as his sponsor.

Errico first felt compelled to enter the priesthood after he turned fourteen and he received permission from his parents to pursue that vocation. He had his sights set on either entering the Order of Friars Minor Capuchin (since two cousins were friars) or the Redemptorists, however, both rejected his application on the basis of his age. But he was not dejected due to this experience and instead focused on his ecclesial studies that he began in Naples in January 1808 (also receiving the clerical cassock for the first time); he had to walk five miles from home to get to class since he was not living in Naples due to his parents' meagre income. Errico – during his studies – visited the sick twice per week and also would encourage children to attend catechism classes for instruction in the faith.

He received his ordination to the priesthood in the Naples Cathedral in the Santa Restituta chapel on 23 September 1815 from Cardinal Luigi Ruffo Scilla. He became a teacher after his ordination and worked as such until 1835 while he also served as a parish priest for the Santi Cosma e Damiano parish church. He was devoted to the sacrament of penance and ministering to the ill, which both became trademarks for his life. He also imposed austerities on himself and penances such as consuming only bread and water and self-flagellation. Errico made annual retreats to the Redemptorist house in Pagani in Salerno. In 1818 during one such retreat he had a vision in which Saint Alfonso Maria de' Liguori came to him and told him that God wanted him to build a new church and to found a new religious congregation. Errico set himself on doing this, and had strong support from the people after having announced it at Pentecost in 1826 (he purchased the land back in 1822). However, this support started to fade over time due to a lack of adequate funding and low work levels. But he continued the project and dedicated and blessed the new church of Madonna Addolorata on 9 December 1830; this church would become a popular destination for pilgrims.

Around the beginning of 1833, he built a small house for himself and a companion (and left his parents' home); it was close to that church so that he could tend to its needs. His companion was not a priest but helped maintain the church. In 1833 came the first members of what would become Errico's religious order known as the Missionari dei Sacri Cuori di Gesù e Maria. On 8 February 1834 the group signed a petition addressed to Cardinal Filippo Giudice Caracciolo asking that they be considered a religious congregation. but the priests grew impatient and left Errico to manage on his own. This small group received diocesan support on 14 March 1836 while the Rome-based Sacred Consistorial Congregation also provided approval on 30 June 1838. He also had to receive permission from the Kingdom of the Two Sicilies which provided its assent on 13 May 1840. In April 1846 he travelled to Rome with the intention of receiving papal approval for his order. This did not materialize for Pope Gregory XVI died on 1 June, leaving Errico in Rome during the conclave. He had a brief encounter with Cardinal Giovanni Mastai-Ferretti and referred to him as "Your Holiness" when speaking with him, having some indication that he would become pope. The order later received full papal approval on 7 August 1846 from the new Pope Pius IX after he and Errico met sometime prior to this. He served as the order's first Superior General.

Errico died in his hometown on 29 October 1860 at 10:00 am due to a visceral fever. He had been ill since mid-October, having contracted bronchitis at that point. It became hard for him to breathe on 26 October at which point his priest nephew Beniamino Errico celebrated Mass at his bedside. On 28 October he received the Anointing of the Sick, and died the next morning while looking at a statue of the Blessed Mother. In 2015 his order had 27 houses (in places such as Indonesia and the United States of America) with 141 religious and 90 priest members. The order's generalate is based in Rome at the Santa Maria in Publicolis church.

== Beatification process ==
=== Diocesan process ===
The beatification process commenced in Naples in an informative process tasked to collect evidence and documentation on Errico's life and possible prospects for being proclaimed a saint. The introduction of the cause came on 18 December 1884 under Pope Leo XIII, in which Errico was titled as a Servant of God – the first official stage in the sainthood process. Theologians deemed his writings to be in line with the magisterium of the faith in 1893 and later held an apostolic process. Both processes received validation from the Congregation of Rites on 11 December 1897.

Errico became titled as venerable on 4 October 1974 after Pope Paul VI recognized that he had lived a life of heroic virtue in accordance with the cardinal and theological virtues.

=== Beatification ===
The process for the investigation of a miracle both opened and concluded in 1999 and received validation from Congregation for the Causes of Saints' officials in Rome on 10 December 1999. The healing believed to be a miracle was deemed to be a legitimate miracle on 24 April 2000 at the behest of Pope John Paul II who in a decree confirmed that Errico could be beatified on that basis. The miracle in question was the healing of Caccioppoli Salvatore who had a perforated stomach wall; his wife put a relic under his pillow and his health improved at a quick pace. This illness was first noted during the morning on 9 January 1952 and Salvatore healed in the hospital a short while later. John Paul II beatified Errico on 14 April 2002.

=== Canonization ===
The process for the investigation of the miracle required for canonization opened in Naples on 10 November 2004 and concluded its business on 10 October 2005 prior to it being validated in 2006. It received the papal approval of Pope Benedict XVI in mid-2007 in which he acknowledged the 2003 healing of Anna Russo (who hailed from Errico's hometown). The date for the canonization was announced on 1 March 2008. On 12 October 2008, Errico was proclaimed to be a saint of the Roman Catholic Church during a Mass held in Saint Peter's Square.
