= Via Dante =

Via Dante may refer to:

- Via Dante, Naples, Italy
- Via Dante, Milan, Italy
