= Missionaries of the Sacred Hearts of Jesus and Mary =

Catholic religious congregation

The Missionaries of the Sacred Hearts of Jesus and Mary, abbreviated as MSSCC, was founded by Saint Gaetano Errico in 1836 in Secondigliano, Italy. It is a religious congregation of priests and brothers. In his book Holiness is Always in Season, Pope Benedict XVI described it as an order devoted to the sacrament of reconciliation, formerly known as confession or penance, calling the saint and his missionaries "expert[s] in the 'science' of forgiveness".
