= Santissimo Salvatore, Naples =

Church in Naples, Italy

The Santissimo Salvatore Church is a church in Naples, located in the historical centre of the Piscinola suburb.

== History ==
It was a parish before the Council of Trent, as evidenced by the records of births and deaths kept in the parish; It existed before the year 1033, as shown by a notarized manuscript, in which he mentions, among other things, the special devotion to the Most Holy Saviour of piscinolesi, already elected to the protector of the town. Perhaps the foundation of the church dates back to the second half of the tenth century.

The church was made in the fourteenth century in Gothic style, but was badly damaged by earthquakes over the centuries that followed, as the terrible 1688, the same earthquake that devastated the Basilica of San Paolo Maggiore in Naples. The church was restored after a few years in the Baroque style, with a rectangular nave with side chapels of patrons. On the side altars and the greater the paintings representing the venerated saints they were placed.

The church has the furnishings of the period prior to the Second Vatican Council, which is the wooden pulpit, the marble balustrade and baptismal font, with the absence of the central altar. Restorations that followed after 1950 the church took its present shape: the façade was re-executed, with alignment to the bell tower, was redesigned the main altar, with the placement of the statue of the Holy Saviour and the wooden statues were also placed in Sant ' Anthony of Padua, St. Blaise and St. Anthony Abbot, all the eighteenth-century works.

During one of these restorations, it emerged plaster a beautiful fresco dating from the fourteenth century, defined by experts "of clear Neapolitan school of Giotto", representing the face of the Madonna della Misericordia. The fresco was detached and nestled above the main altar.

In the early 2000s, the church was again restored, so also in the seventeenth-century wooden organ, the facade and roof trusses. It was then built an oratory, with a theater and open spaces for sport and leisure.

Underneath the church are pre-19th-century communal tombs, with separate chambers for adults and children.
