= Kobret =

Low grade heroin smuggled by Camorra

Kobret is a low-grade form of heroin, notable for its use in Campania, Italy, and its sale by criminal organizations in the area. In Scampia, a neighborhood of Naples, the drug is sold by the criminal organization Camorra. In the large open-air drug market within Scampia, Kobret is sold along with cocaine, crack, hashish and heroin. The drug is common along with heroin and cocaine along the Viale della Resistenza.
