= Piscinola =

Quarter of Naples, Italy

Coordinates: 40°54′N 14°14′E

- Quarter of Naples
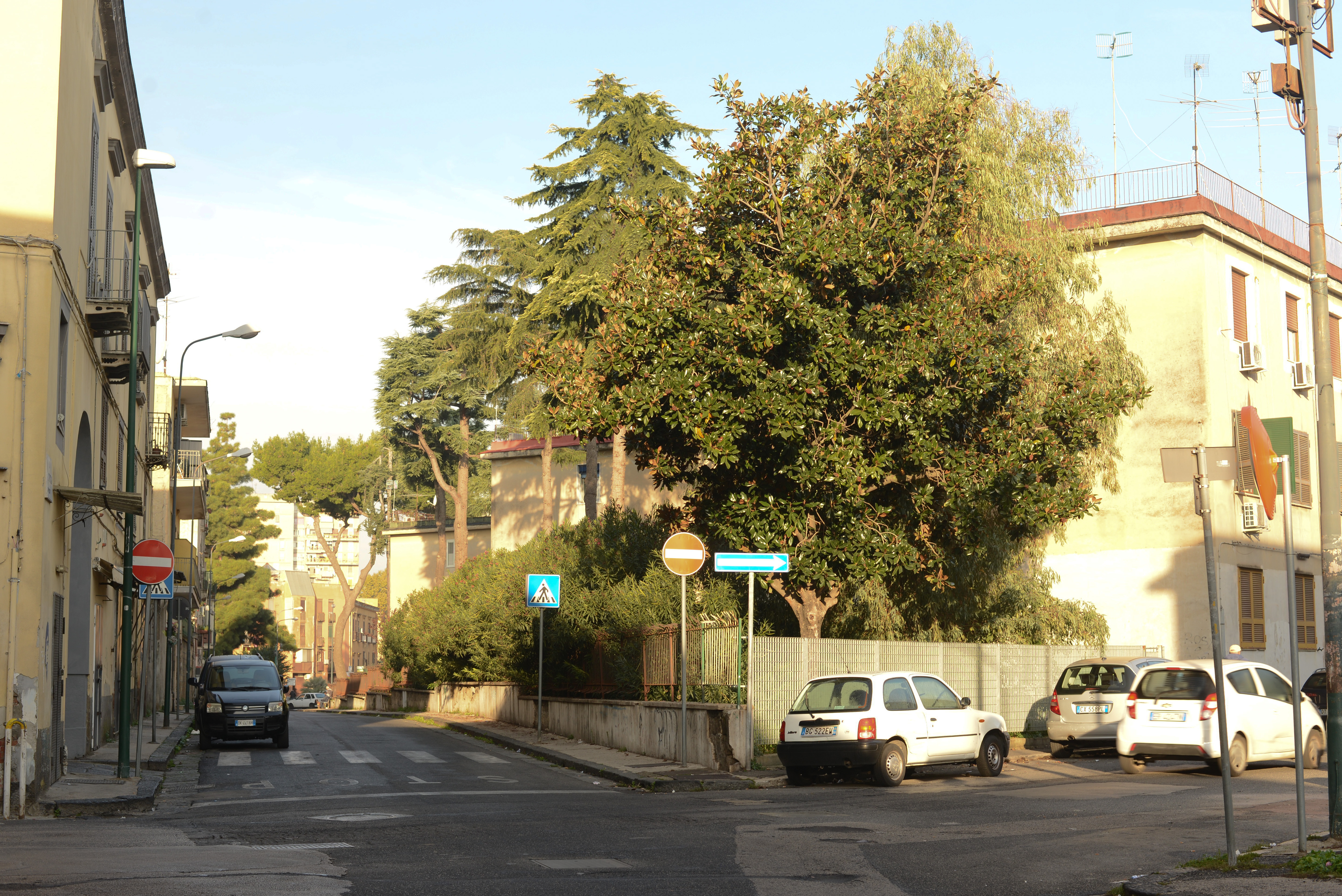
- View of via Napoli a Piscinola.

- Location of Piscinola within Naples
- Country: Italy
- Region: Campania
- City: Naples
- Municipalità: 8th

Area
  - Total: 3.55 km^{2} (1.37 sq mi)

Population
  - Total: 27,534
  - Density: 7,760/km^{2} (20,100/sq mi)
- Postal code: 80145

Piscinola is a northern quarter of Naples, Italy, with a population of ca. 20,000. It is bordered to the north by the Scampia district, north-west with the municipality of Mugnano of Naples, on the west by the Chiaiano district, to the south with the district of San Carlo all'Arena and east with the district Miano.

With the Marianella neighborhood and adjacent neighborhoods Chiaiano and Scampia, Piscinola constitutes, since 2005, the 8th municipality of Naples.

An autonomous municipality until 1866, since its annexation to the City of Naples, Piscinola has also been known as one of the suppressed municipalities of Italy.

== Transports ==
=== Naples Metro ===
Since 1995, the northern branch of Line 1 of Naples Metro has connected the area to the center of Naples. The rail depot is located next to Piscinola station as the suburban terminus.

Piscinola is also connected to Aversa Centro, through Line 11, also called "rainbow line", managed by the Ente Autonomo Volturno, opened in 2005 to replace an old station along the railway Alifana active between 1913 and 1975.

=== Urban mobility ===
Piscinola is served by

- Buses in local and long-distance, operated respectively by ANM and CTP
- Piscinola Scampia station, like Garibaldi beyond it a Line 1 northern terminus of the Naples Metro, allowing interchange with Line 11 terminus below and from a nearby station the railway Naples-Giugliano-Aversa ending in the northwest of Campania.

Between 1926 and 1960 the town was connected with the center via the Line 2 of local trams (associated with in-between Capodimonte).

== Monuments and places of interest ==
=== Cultural heritage ===
- Church of the Santissimo Salvatore
- Church of Arciconfraternita Estaurita of Santissimo Sacramento
- Churches of the Madonna delle Grazie, S. M. del Soccorso and S. Maria della Pietà (called St. Vincent)
- Various archaeological finds
- Various palaces
- Palaces "At court," and "estates" in the local agricultural style
- Ancient center adjacent to the street SS. Salvatore
- Vico operai (historic building founded by the farmers of the Scampia lands)
- Public garden "Mario Musella"
- Municipal library "Don D. Severino"

=== Historic Piscinola center ===
Although greatly altered in the period after the earthquake, the historic center of Piscinola still retains many interesting architectural relics of the past. The "island" which is defined by way of the Salvatore, Napoli Street and Miano street, is the oldest part, whose plant is perhaps coeval with the foundation of the church of SS. Salvatore, i.e. around the year 950. Surely the buildings rise in the area were made, to replace the previous artifacts, in later ages, between the 16th and 18th centuries.

== Social solidarity ==
Which has become a symbol of redemption for the "Villa Nestor 'district is the main pole of social welfare activities Piscinola managed by the municipal administration in partnership with the Rotary Club and the Italian Red Cross. The structure can count on a large construction of premises: gym, ballroom, an auditorium, a senior center, a cooking workshop and the door to immigrants. In consultation with the school district 44 and the Territorial Unit of Base 48 they have also been initiated for integration testing, e.g. l '"garden villa" entrusted to a mixed group of children and the elderly, the "Newspaper of the Villa", curated by the "invisible Doors", which documents the local activities and the "Game Room".
