= 8th municipality of Naples =

Eighth Municipality of Naples Municipalità 8 Ottava Municipalità
- Borough
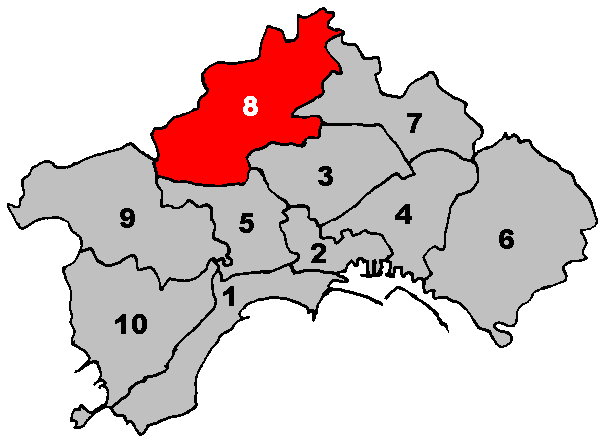
- Location within Naples
- Coordinates: 40°53′34″N 14°14′16″E
- Country: Italy
- Municipality: Naples
- Established: 2005
- Seat: Viale Resistenza, comp. 12

Government
  - President: Carmine Malinconico
  - Vice President: Nicola Tortella

Area
  - Total: 17.45 km^{2} (6.74 sq mi)

Population (2007)
  - Total: 92,616
  - Density: 5,308/km^{2} (13,750/sq mi)
- Website: M8 on Naples site

The Eighth Municipality (In Italian: Ottava Municipalità or Municipalità 8) is one of the ten boroughs in which the Italian city of Naples is divided.

== Geography ==
The municipality represents the northernmost suburb of the city and borders with Arzano, Casandrino, Melito di Napoli, Mugnano di Napoli and Marano di Napoli.

Its territory includes the zone of Marianella and Santa Croce.

== Administrative division ==
The Eighth Municipality is divided into 3 quarters:

Quarter	Population	Area (km^{2})
Chiaiano	23,045	9.67
Piscinola	28,221	3.55
Scampìa	41,350	4.23
Total	92,616	17.45
