= Coat of arms of Naples =

Naples
- Armiger: Gaetano Manfredi, Mayor of Naples
- Adopted: 1943

The coat of arms of Naples consists of a Samnite shield divided horizontally in half with the upper part in gold and the lower half in red. The shield is stamped with a turreted city crown of the type in use before the Royal decree n. 652 of 7 June 1943.

== Blazon ==
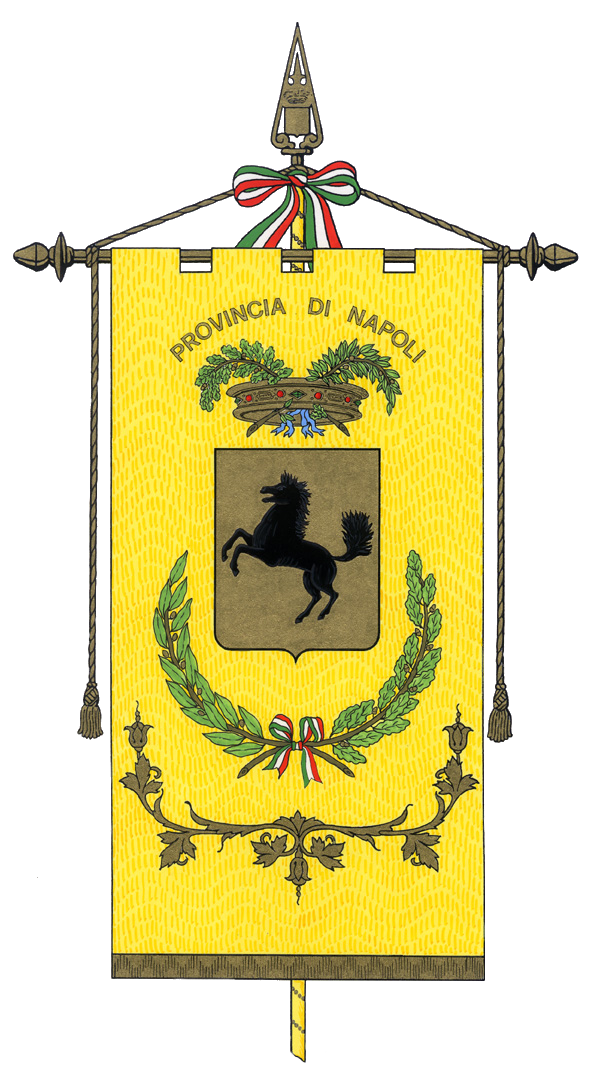

The coat of arms, approved by decree of 13 January 1941, has the following blazon:

Troncato d'oro e di rosso.

The description of the banner is as follows:

Troncato d'oro e di rosso, caricato dello stemma civico, con l'iscrizione in oro "Comune di Napoli".

The banner is decorated with a gold medal for military valor for the sacrifices of the population and for the activities in the partisan struggle during the so-called Four days of Naples uprising.

== History ==
The origins of the city's coat of arms is the subject of several legends, most of them originating in the 17th century. One legend on the origin of the coat of arms of Naples claims that it alludes to the colors of the sun and moon cult practiced by the city's pre-Christian inhabitants. The most widespread legend, supported by Summonte, explains that the colors in the coat of arms were used to welcome Emperor Constantine I and his mother Elena in 324, when the population converted to Christianity by renouncing the ancient cult of the sun and moon to which the two colors alluded. Alternatively, it was considered to be a symbol of the struggles fought at the time of the independent Duchy (755–1027) against the Longobard Principality of Benevento and in alliance with the Norman Count of Aversa Rainulfo. These theses were already declared unfounded by the historian Bartolommeo Capasso in 11th century.

Coat of arms of Aragon

One of the first symbols used by the city was the horse, used in the coinage of the municipality of Naples after Frederick II, mid-thirteenth century, and still present today on the emblem of the Metropolitan City of Naples. The first documentary attestation of the use of the current coat of arms is perhaps a seal present on a document dated 31 January 1488 and therefore one of the first hypotheses of scholars was that the coat of arms of Naples descended from that of the Aragonese kings (the famous Bars of aragon) due to the fact that the same colors are present on the two symbols and that its adoption took place after their conquest of the kingdom of Naples by Alfonso V of Aragon, which took place in 1442. In reality, the fact that two representations of that which could be the Neapolitan emblem are present in two earlier documents, from the Angevin period, would lead to anticipate the birth of the symbol itself.

The first document, the Regia carmina, is from the 14th century, it is a panegyric in honor of King Robert of Anjou, probably the work of Convenevole da Prato, composed between 1328 and 1336; in this illuminated manuscript there is a miniature in which a standard bearer bears two insignia, the main and largest is the flag of the Royal House of France (in blue sown with golden lilies), to which the Angevins belonged, while the second it is smaller and is a simple vertically divided flag of red-gold color; it must be considered that in the Middle Ages the flags were obtained from the coats of arms through a 90° rotation. By scholars this second symbol, not immediately connected with anything known at the time, was often considered "allegorical" or to be identified with the oriflamme of the French royal house. The two hypotheses are to be discarded as the first does not explain why an "allegorical" symbol (the flag of Anjou) should be accompanied by an "allegorical" one, the second underestimates the fact that the oriflamme belonged to the king of France alone. as well as being different from the one shown here. It is possible that instead it is a further Angevin symbol which later went on to identify the capital city of the kingdom.

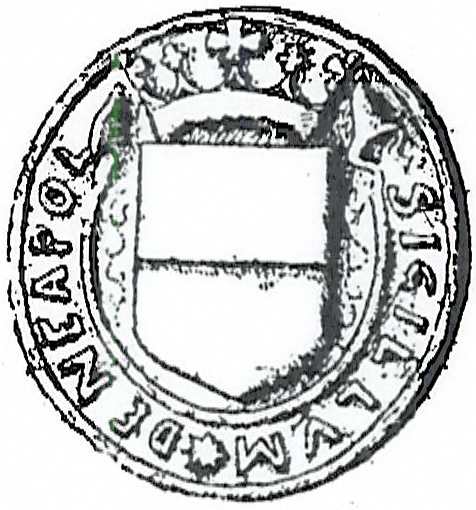
Seal of 1488 bearing the coat of arms of Naples.

The second document is a pilot book whose drafting dates back to the years 1325–1330 by Angelino Dalorto, in which unlike contemporary works, Naples is not assigned the Angevin insignia but a two-colored flag, the color of the parchment in the part of the rod and red in the other half. A commentator on the work warns that "it is not the emblem of the realm, but only the city."

On the provenance of the red and gold colors to the Angevins, from whom they passed to the city, it can be observed that red-gold are the colors of the Catholic Church of which they stood as champions against the Empire, so it may be that Charles I of Anjou used them at the time of his encounter with Manfredi; on the other hand they too used the Aragon poles as descendants of Blanche of Castile, moreover the fief of Provence inherited by Charles of Anjou also came from the Catalan house of the counts of Barcelona. The Catalan symbol is present in many Angevin testimonies.

The first evidence in which the current coat of arms is used in an official document of the city is an act dated 31 January 1488, with which the Electi Civitatis Neapolis lodge an appeal against some Gabelles; the document has a seal imprinted on paper in turn attached to the sheet with red wax, on the seal there is the city coat of arms surmounted by a ducal crown and surrounded by the legend Sigillvm de Neapol.

At other times, different shapes or symbols were used to represent the coat of arms. During the Neapolitan Republic of 1647, established following the revolt of Masaniello, a letter P was placed in the center of the shield, as a symbol of the supremacy of the people, which then became an initial C of the word civitas. In 1866 the custom of superimposing a ducal crown on the coat of arms was abandoned, in memory of the time when Naples was the capital of the homonymous duchy, to replace it with a turreted crown, a heraldic symbol of "the desire for freedom and municipal independence".

During Fascism the coat of arms, in compliance with the Royal decrees of the time, was initially placed side by side in 1928 with a fasces, while in 1933 the leader of the Littorio was imposed, then eliminated in 1944.

In 2005, with resolution no. 39 of 21 November, the municipal administration launched a competition of ideas to innovate the graphic identity of the municipality while keeping the coat of arms unaltered. From the competition, won by the company Vpoint (Luca Mosele art director), came the new logo with the cyan "wave" and the writing "Comune di Napoli", for which the Roman and bold Frutiger font is used, 1 January 2007, is present on all the acts of the municipality.

Ed in vero quali colori più acconci di questi potevansi scegliere? L'oro simboleggia il sole, l'astro più bello e più splendido che feconda ed illumina la natura. Il rosso è il primo dei colori, perché quello della porpora, che era la veste dei re e degli insigni personaggi. Anzi gli scrittori di araldica dicono che lo scudo spaccato di oro e di rosso dimostra nobiltà magnanima, sovrana giurisdizione con ricchezze, ed animo congiunto alla virtù

— Padiglione, p. 73

== Bibliography ==
- Alessandro Savorelli, L'origine dello stemma di Napoli tra arte, storia e mito, in Napoli nobilissima, vol. XXXVIII, 1999, pp. 185–194, ISSN 0027-7835.
- Carlo Padiglione, Lo stemma della città di Napoli, s.l., s.n., pp. 71–74.
