= Siege of Naples =

There have been several sieges of Naples:

- Siege of Naples (536) by the Byzantines
- Siege of Naples (542–543) by the Ostrogoths
- Siege of Naples (958) by the Byzantines
- Siege of Naples (1078) by Prince Richard I of Capua
- Siege of Naples (1191) by Henry VI, Holy Roman Emperor
- Siege of Naples (1441) by Alfonso V of Aragon
- Siege of Naples (1494) during the Italian War of 1494–1498
- Siege of Naples (1528) by Louis, Count of Vaudémont
- Capture of Naples (1799) by the Army of Naples (France)
- Capture of Naples (1799) by the Sanfedisti
