= Flag of Naples =

Italian municipal flag

Present flag of Naples

The flag of Naples is a vexillological symbol of the city of Naples, the capital of the Southern Italian region of Campania. The current flag representing the city consists of two equal-sized rectangles: golden yellow on the left and red on the right side.

Historically, the flag of Naples was a national flag during the existence of the Kingdom of Naples. Several different flags were used throughout its history, depending on who controlled the nation at the time. Perhaps the most prominent flags associated with the kingdom are the original Angevin flag, the Bourbon flag, and the senyera (used when the country was part of the Crown of Aragon).

== History ==
Naples has had other flags in the past, including flags of the Kingdom of Naples.

After Naples was united with Sicily in 1442, the flag used the colours of Aragon. Starting in 1735, the flag of the Kingdom of Naples was green and white.

When Naples was part of the Parthenopaean Republic (1799), the flag had 3 vertical stripes, blue, yellow and red. After 1806, the flag was composed of three stripes of white, red and black. Both horizontal and vertical versions were in use. This flag was used up to 1808.

When Joachim Murat was the king of Naples (1808–1815), the corners of the flag had 2 red and 2 black triangles, and the coat of arms was inside a rhombus in the center. In 1811 Murat changed the flag to blue with a rectangle in the center whose border was checkered white and red. The coat of arms was on the left side of the rectangle (the civil flag had no coat of arms). From 1820 through 1821, the flag of Naples had 3 horizontal stripes colored blue, black and red. The current flag has been in use since 1821.

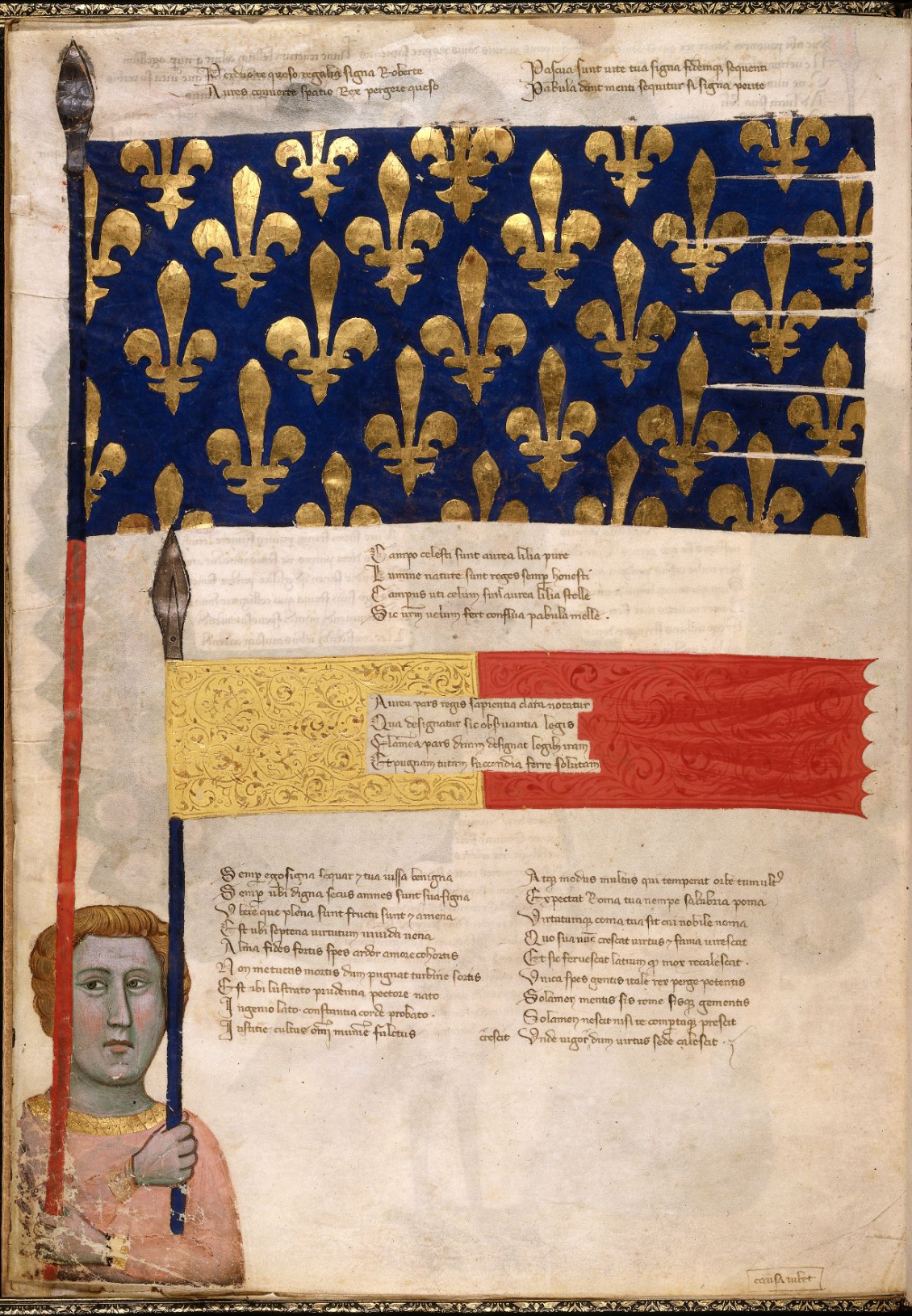
Medieval flags of the Kingdom of Naples (top) and the city of Naples (bottom) c.1335

== Historical flags ==
Naples has formed the basis of many kingdoms and republics during its history. Below are some historical flags associated with Neapolitan domains.

Flag	Period used	Description
	1282–1442	The flag was first introduced during the period when the Capetian House of Anjou founded and ruled the Kingdom of Naples.
	1442–1516 (direct rule)	The kingdom was part of the Crown of Aragon and as thus, the iconic red and yellow senyera became the country's flag. It was represented together with Anjou's colors as well.
	1516–1700	When the Habsburg King Charles V came to the throne, the kingdom adopted the flag of the rest of the Spanish Empire, the Cross of Burgundy.
	1714–1734	After the War of the Spanish Succession, Charles VI, Holy Roman Emperor became King of Naples, as Charles VI, following the Treaty of Rastatt.
	1734–1799; 1799–1806; 1815–1860	This flag was used during the rule of the House of Bourbon, first as the flag of the Kingdom of Naples and later as the flag of the Two Sicilies. Bourbon rule was briefly interrupted by other rulers during the early 19th century. The flags of these are listed below.
	1799	The revolutionary flag of the short lived Parthenopaean Republic, based on the French tricolour with gold in the place of white. It is almost the same as the flags of Romania and Chad.
	1806–1808	This was the Napoleonic flag used for the kingdom during the time that Joseph Bonaparte ruled it.
	1808–1811	This was the Napoleonic flag used for the kingdom during some of the time that Joachim Murat ruled it.
	1811–1815	This was the Napoleonic flag used for the kingdom during the second part of the time that Joachim Murat ruled it. He used this new flag during his period as King of Two Sicilies, representing Hauteville's colors.
