= Chiaiano =

Quarter of Naples, Italy

Coordinates: 40°52′52″N 14°12′37″E

- Quarter of Naples
- Location of Chiaiano within Naples
- Country: Italy
- Region: Campania
- City: Naples
- Municipalità: 8th

Area
  - Total: 9.67 km^{2} (3.73 sq mi)

Population
  - Total: 23.396
  - Density: 2.42/km^{2} (6.27/sq mi)
- Demonym: chiaianesi
- Postal codes: 80145 and 80131

Chiaiano is a north-western quarter of Naples, with a population of about 23,000.

== Geography ==
Chiaiano is a hilly and wooded area that lies between Camaldoli and the Campi Flegrei.

== History ==
Archaeologically, the area is of interest, displaying remnants of pre-and-non-Roman inhabitants such as the Oscans and Samnites.

Since the earthquake of 1980, it is one of the outlying areas that has undergone extreme urbanization—that is, large tracts of public housing to provide for those left homeless by that event.

In 2008, No Dal Molin protested the opening of a refuse tip in the quarries between Chiaiano and Marano.

== Twin towns ==
It is twinned with Manhattan, the commercial quarter of New York and has received the certificate of calmer quarter of the city.
