= 7th municipality of Naples =

Seventh Municipality of Naples Municipalità 7 Settima Municipalità
- Borough
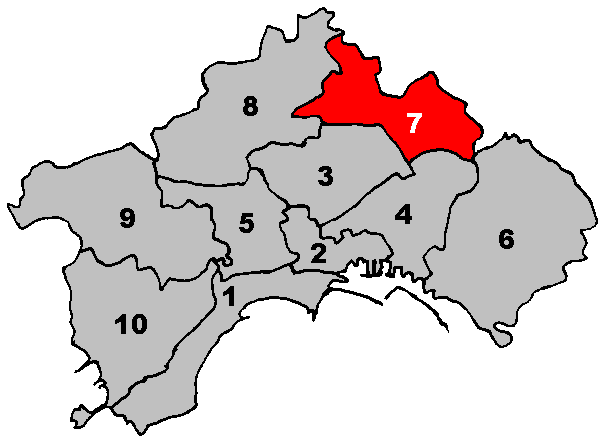
- Location within Naples
- Coordinates: 40°53′27.53″N 14°17′4.85″E
- Country: Italy
- Municipality: Naples
- Established: 2005
- Seat: Piazza Giovanni Guarino, 3

Government
  - President: Giuseppe Esposito
  - Vice President: Nunzia Barbato

Area
  - Total: 10.26 km^{2} (3.96 sq mi)

Population (2007)
  - Total: 91,460
  - Density: 8,914/km^{2} (23,090/sq mi)
- Website: M7 on Naples site

The Seventh Municipality (In Italian: Settima Municipalità or Municipalità 7) is one of the ten boroughs in which the Italian city of Naples is divided.

== Geography ==
The municipality is located in the north-eastern suburb of the city and borders with Casoria, Casavatore and Arzano.

Its territory includes the zones of Ponti Rossi and Capodichino, seat of Naples Airport.

== Administrative division ==
The Seventh Municipality is divided into 3 quarters:

Quarter	Population	Area (km^{2})
Miano	26,501	1.87
San Pietro a Patierno	18,390	5.45
Secondigliano	46,569	2.94
Total	91,460	10.26
