= Scampia =

Suburb of Naples, Italy

Coordinates: 40°54′00″N 14°14′24″E

- Quarter of Naples
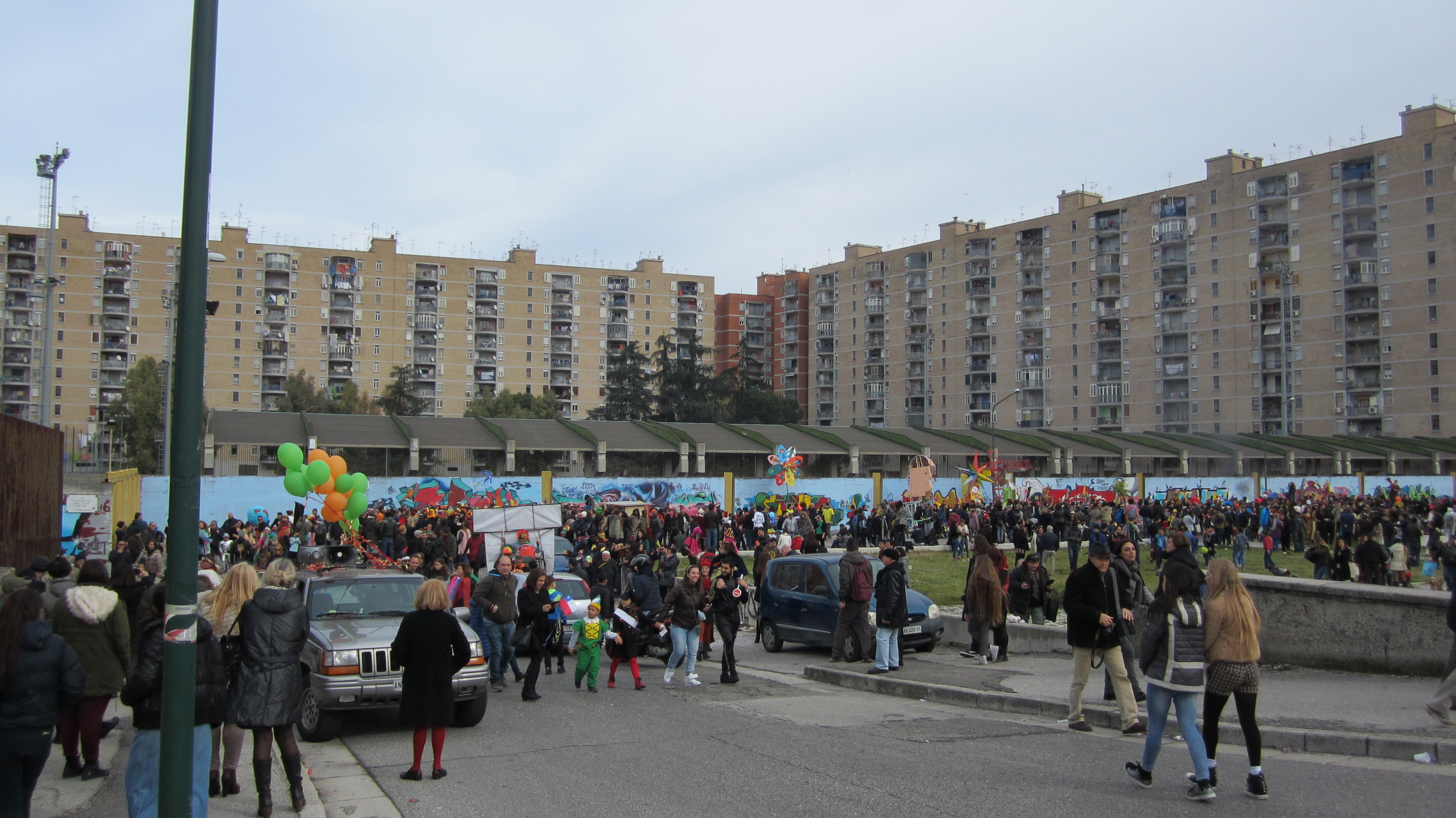
- Scampia Carnival in 2016

- Location of Scampia within Naples
- Country: Italy
- Region: Campania
- City: Naples
- Municipalità: 8th

Area
  - Total: 4.23 km^{2} (1.63 sq mi)

Population
  - Total: 39,060
  - Density: 9,230/km^{2} (23,900/sq mi)
- Demonym: scampiani
- Postal codes: 80144 and 80145

Scampia (Italian: [skamˈpiːa]; Neapolitan: Scampìa) is a modern quarter in the far north of Naples, whose population is about 40,000. To its south are the suburbs of Piscinola, Miano and Secondigliano.

It was built during the second half of the twentieth century. Scampia borders to the south with the Piscinola and Miano suburbs, to the south-east with the Secondigliano district, to the east with the municipality of Arzano; to the north with the municipalities of Casandrino and Melito di Napoli, and to the west with the municipality of Mugnano di Napoli.

== History ==
Naples starts in Scampia.

— Title of an article by Roberto Saviano

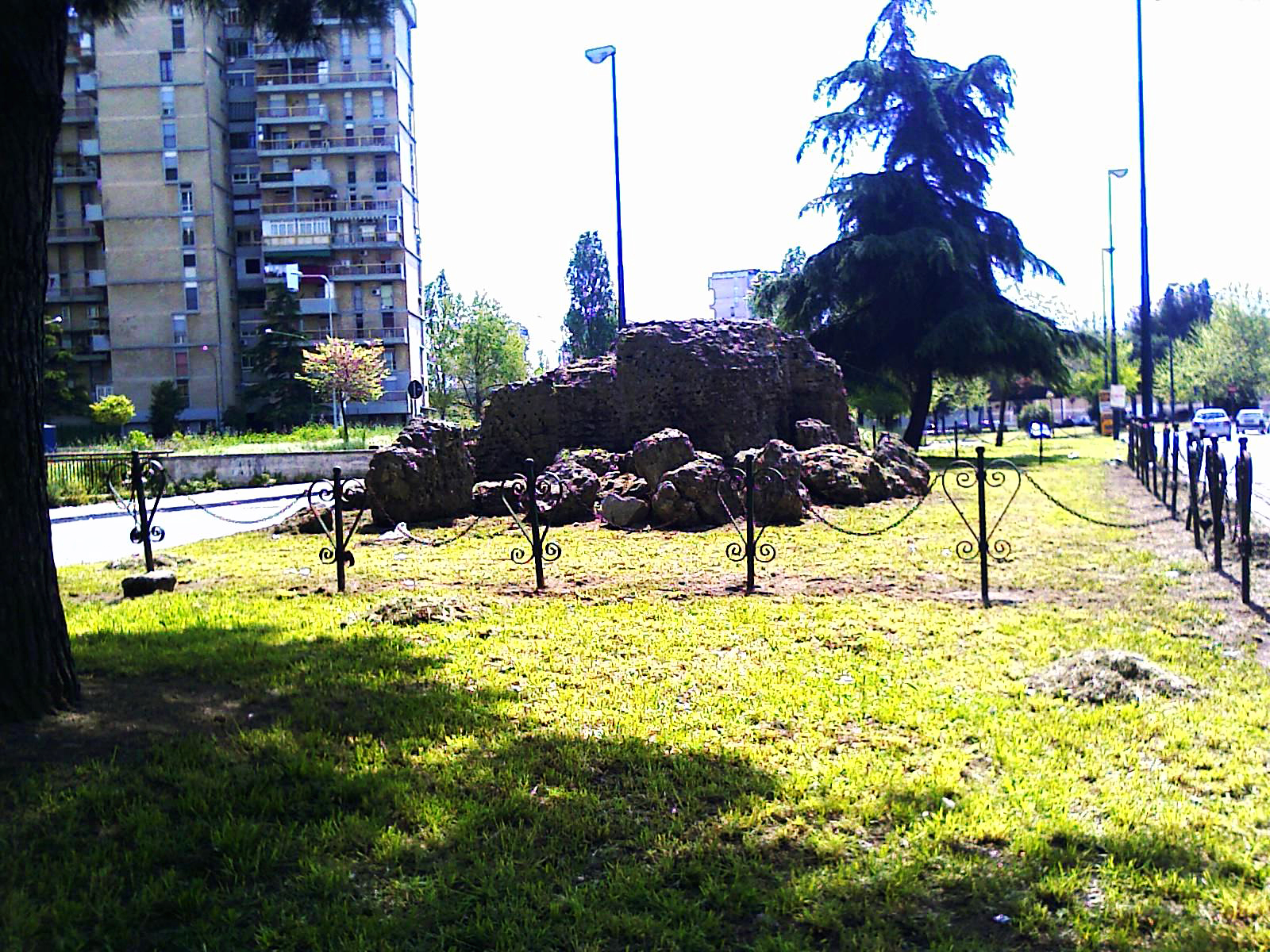
Roman ruins

Scampia is the name of a small rural village, which fell within the nearby municipality of Secondigliano. Some remains of a Roman villa survive as evidence of the original agricultural vocation. It was, in fact, a land rich in fruit trees, especially walnuts and apples. The first modern residential nucleus dates back to the second post-war period, but the real building boom took place only in the twenty years of the 70s and 90s (over 80% of the buildings date back to that period), when the neighborhood was established as the 21st district of Naples.

Since 2006 it has been part of the VIII Municipality of the Municipality of Naples together with the neighboring districts of Piscinola-Marianella and Chiaiano.

Scampia was built as a commuter town in the 1960s. The area was mostly developed in the 1970s and 1980s with huge, high-rise residential blocks, in particular after the 1980 earthquake with construction of housing in the area called "167" for displaced Neapolitans. Huge apartment complexes, wide boulevards and a massive park were built, without commercial districts or entertainment venues. Many people, however, were not placed in Scampia because of the problems caused by the earthquake. They occupied house in different buildings of the neighbourhood, in particular many houses in the "Vele". That was especially due to the Camorra crime syndicate, that took control of the "Vele" and turned them into their own space in which drugs could be sold or hidden from the police. Large metal gates on some of the walkways and stairs in the blocks of flats have been put there, not by the council, but by the Camorra itself, so they can be locked by drug pushers as they flee the police. With over 50% unemployment, the area had in fact a very high crime rate, with heroin (including its low-grade form, kobret) and cocaine sold, and used openly, in the streets.

Scampia was also the territory of the Di Lauro clan, which controlled the drug trade and most other illegal activities in the area. In 2004 a bloody gang war erupted in the area, the so-called Scampia feud, between the Di Lauro family and a breakaway faction, the "secessionists".

The death of an innocent woman, Gelsomina Verde, caused widespread public revulsion and led to a major crackdown by the authorities. She was abducted, brutally beaten in an effort to get her to disclose the whereabouts of a gang member involved in the feud, and finally shot in the neck. Her body was stuffed in a car that was set on fire.

Although most of the services are of a public nature (Municipality, Local Health Authority, UTB), even associations in the form of committees have taken root in the culture of the neighbourhood: for the house, for the felling of the Sails, for the LSU and for the Bros. In addition to these, there are the actors of the voluntary sector and the third sector who have activated various services for the prevention and fight against marginalization such as, for example, the "Arci Scampia" football school, the "Finestra adolescents" project and the "Aizo" association for the social integration of nomadic populations.

Furthermore, on 3 January 2006, the Iervolino junta established "Napolinord", the urban transformation company with a share capital of 500 million euros.

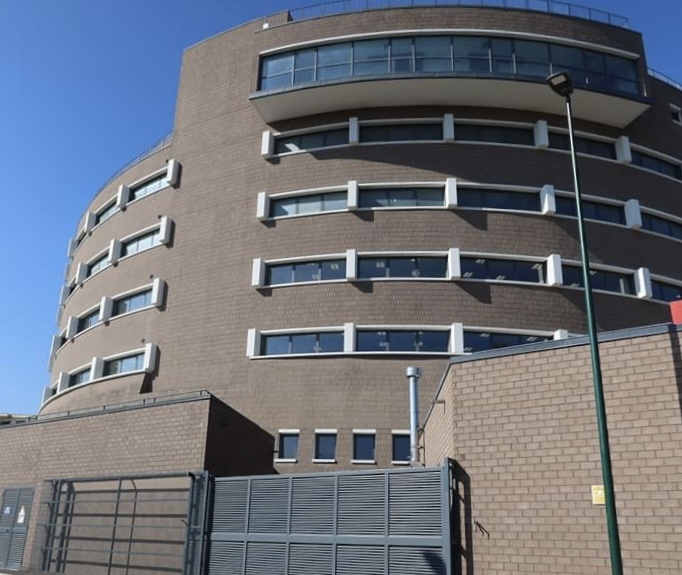
University of Naples Federico II, site of Scampia.

In 2008, with the help of European funds, many projects were presented with the intention of improving the area. First of all, one of the headquarters' of the Medical Department of the University of Naples Federico II.

Moreover, in 2010 many military forces have been placed outside the subway station of "Piscinola" and also in the vicinity of the "Vele" in order to offer more security to the area.

In 2016 many residents that lived in the "Vele" started being placed in the new buildings erected in an area close to the station, in order to carry on the project of demolishing them, in order to also eliminate the symbol of Camorra. The project that has allowed this relocation has been actually named "Restart Scampia".

The Scampia university complex was inaugurated in October 2022, located in Viale della Resistenza in a circular building. The structure houses the three-year and master's courses for the health professions of the Faculty of Medicine and Surgery with the degree courses in Nutrition and Dietetics.

== Geography ==
The neighborhood has a green lung, Parco Ciro Esposito, named in honor of the S.S.C. Napoli fan killed by far-right militant and A.S. Roma ultras Daniele De Santis. The public park is located in Viale della Resistenza.

=== Vele di Scampia ===
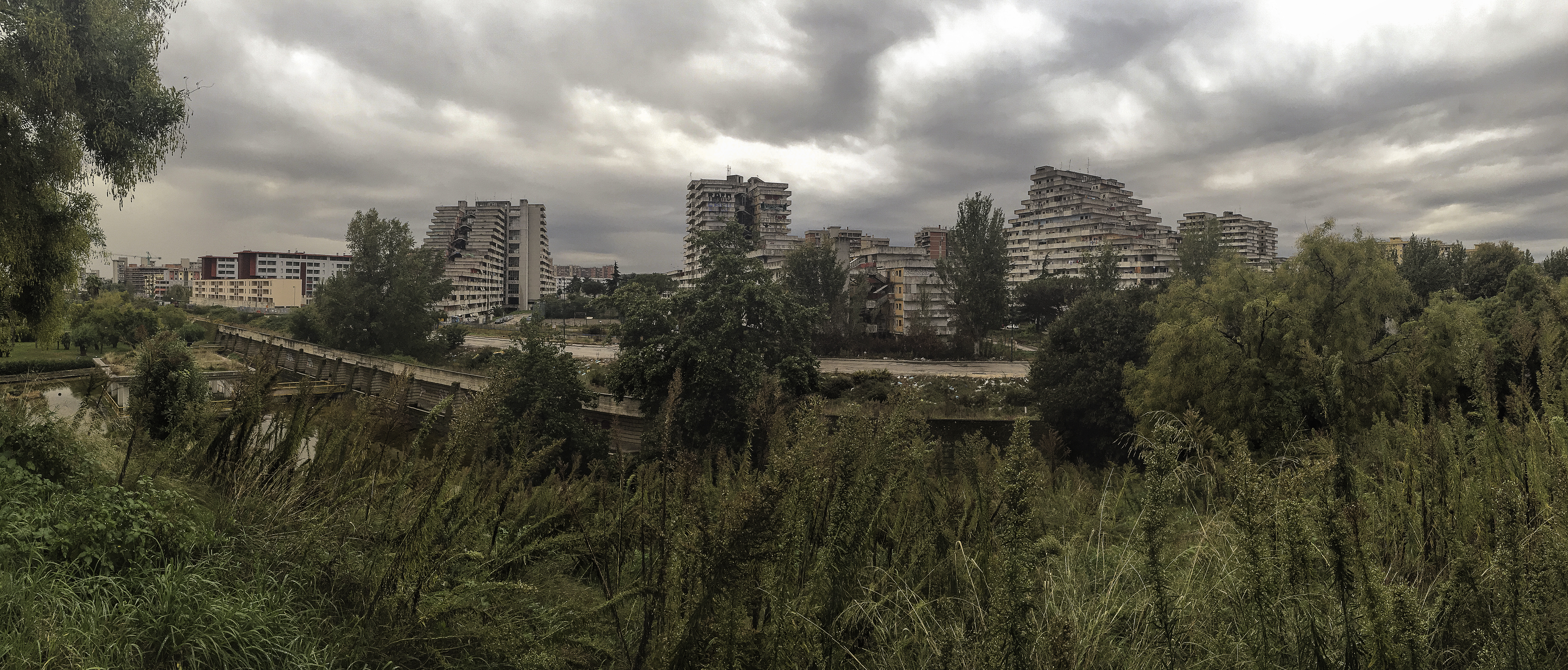
The Vele di Scampia

The Vele di Scampia ("Sails of Scampia") is a large urban housing project built between 1962 and 1975 in the Scampia neighbourhood. Built as a result of Law 167, which was passed in 1962, the Sails of Scampia were designed by Francesco Di Salvo. They were part of a project which also included development of the city of Naples to the east, in Ponticelli. After years of continuous design experiments, the task of establishing a large apartment complex in Scampia was entrusted to the Cassa del Mezzogiorno. The design followed the housing unit principles articulated by Le Corbusier for the design of public housing. He was influenced by the trestle structures proposed by Kenzō Tange. Di Salvo proposed a plan for the district which was based on two building types: a "tower" and "tent". The tent type provides the dominant impression of sails. The buildings were designed to provide subsistence-level dwellings: deliberately minimal, with many shared exterior spaces where life would take place. This was done with the specific aim of reconstructing the spirit of Naples's alleys and courtyards, crowded but congenial, in an apartment building. This philosophy additionally reduced construction costs; and construction was skimped as funds were stolen, and the works were not finished.

==== Decline ====
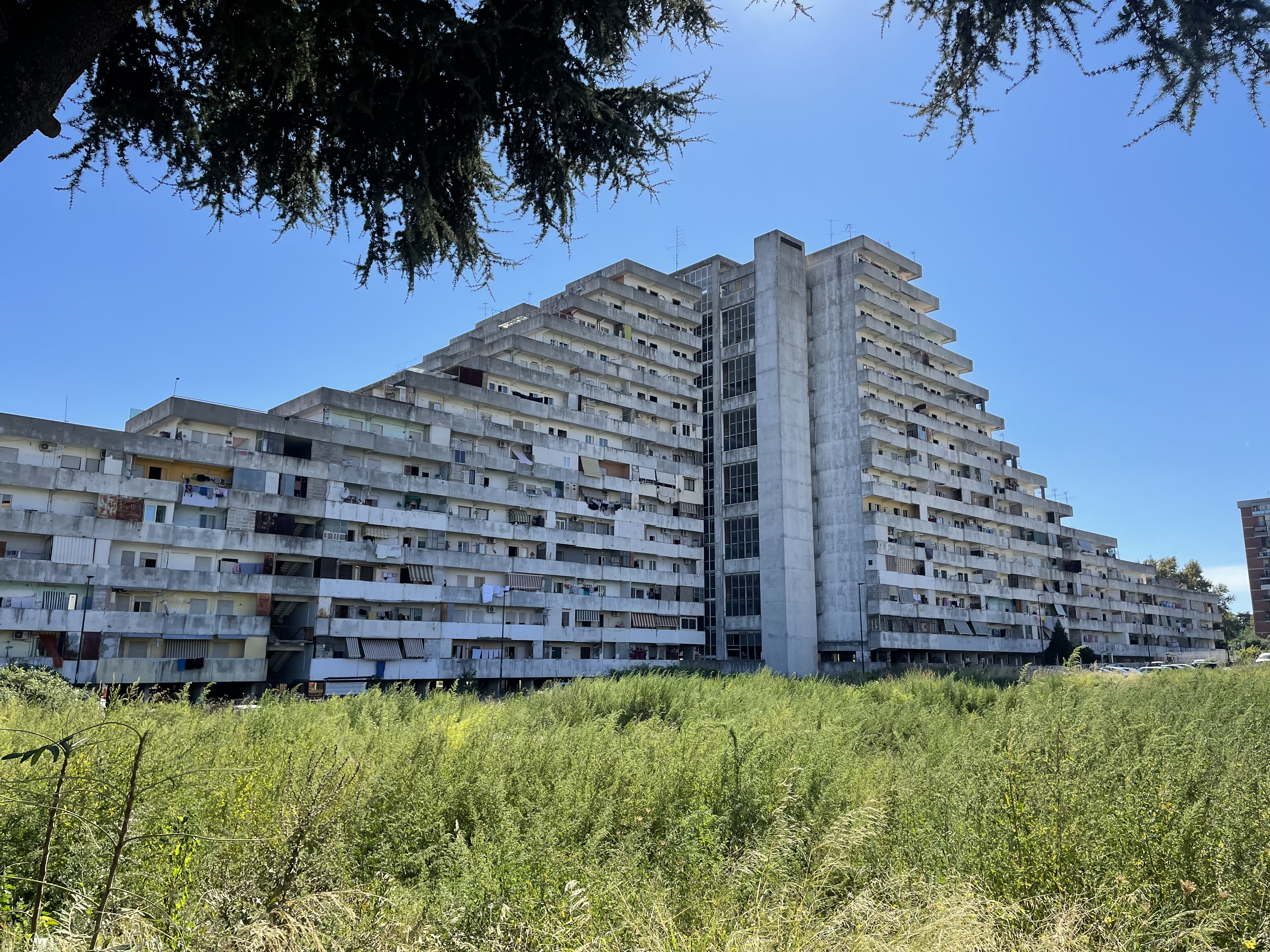
Vela Scampia

Originally, the complex consisted of seven massive apartment blocks, and housed from 40,000 to 70,000 people, although a real headcount was never conducted. Three of the seven blocks were demolished in 1997, 2000 and 2003, but some 40,000 people still lived in the remaining blocks.

The idea behind the project was to provide a huge public housing project, where hundreds of families could socialize and create a community. The design included a public transportation rail station, and a large park area between the two buildings. The planners wanted to create a small city model with large parks, playing fields, and other facilities.

However, various causes have led to what is now regarded as a ghetto. Right after the earthquake in 1980, many families in the area were left homeless. Many of these families without shelter started to occupy the apartments illegally. Tolerated and ignored by the government, more people started to occupy the buildings including criminals. Things were made worse by the total lack of police presence, resulting in drug trafficking, illegal street racing, gangs, and fencing operations. Roberto Saviano wrote the book Gomorrah about organised criminality by the Camorra (the Neapolitan mafia)—with the Vele playing a big part—and discussed the Vele and their decline and criminality extensively in a long article about the demolition of the last of the sails in 2020.

The first police station for the area was established in 1987, fifteen years after people began occupying the apartments.

==== Demolition ====
Following continuous protest by the residents who felt that their extensive problems could not be fixed, the intention to demolish the complex was announced in 2016. In 2019 residents began moving into new apartments built nearby, leaving their old apartments empty and bricked up, awaiting demolition. One tower, the Blue Sail, will be used as offices for the comune of Naples.

Demolition, which was delayed by the discovery of asbestos, started on 20 February 2020 and was almost completed by July 2020. Further demolition started on 10 March 2025.

== Traditions and folklore ==
One of the most important Carnival processions in the city of Naples takes place in Scampia.

Every year the Premio Secondigliano takes place here (district adjacent to Scampia), which rewards all people born in these two districts and who distinguish themselves in the artistic field (literature, theater and music).

At the beginning of 2019, two new Jorti murals "Pasolini" and "Angela Davis" were inaugurated in Scampia. Pasolini's mural is accompanied by the following quote:

Non lasciarti tentare dai campioni dell’infelicità, della mutria cretina, della serietà ignorante. Sii allegro.

T’insegneranno a non splendere.

E tu splendi, invece.

— Pier Paolo Pasolini, Lettere luterane

Do not be tempted by the champions of unhappiness, of dumb cretin, of ignorant seriousness. Be cheerful.

They will teach you not to shine.

And you shine, instead.

— Pier Paolo Pasolini, Lettere luterane

The association "Vo.di.Sca" (Voci di Scampia, in English: Scampia's Voices), created by Rosario Esposito La Rossa, a writer, editor and bookseller born in Scampia, and Maddalena Stornaiuolo, has moved the Neapolitan publishing company "Marotta&Cafiero editori" from Posillipo to Scampia, turning it into an independent and open-source publishing house. It publishes books printed on recycled paper with non-polluting ink having the license "Creative Commons" and produced from the bottom. It is, in fact, the first cooperative made by young people in the northern area of Naples. This publishing house has also embraced the field of music with the recording label "Marotta&Cafiero Recorder", which has published more than 10 CDs and a vinyl.

In 2013 "Marotta&Cafiero" becomes a book store with the name "Marotta&Cafiero Store". It was placed in the "Teatro Bellini" and it has been managed only by women. After one year the store was opened also in Scampia, becoming the first book store of the quarter. It is however a private library into a public school, but it has founded the "caffè letterario equo e solidale Sottopalco" (in English it would be "literary, equal and integral café Sottopalco"), in collaboration with the "Teatro Bellini". It includes three rooms in which are often organized book presentations, debates and conferences. It is of course also a café that sells only integral and equal products, it has spaces used for musical showcases, photographic exhibitions and many other activities. In addition, it has a bistrot that offers only local and fresh products by gastronomy excellences in the area of Naples.

In 2016 the company becomes the responsible of the rebirth of the publishing house "Coppola editore", founded in 1984 by Salvatore Coppola, which was famous because of his dedication to the fight against the organised crime.

== In popular culture ==
Scenes from the movie Gomorrah were filmed in the neighbourhood in 2008.

Moreover, the homonym TV series Gomorrah (2014) was also based on the same book written by Roberto Saviano and it was directed by Stefano Sollima. Many scenes, especially episodes of season two, were filmed in different Scampia's buildings. It also includes actors who actually live in Scampia, like Christian Giroso.

The music video made by the French rap duo PNL's single "Le Monde ou Rien" was recorded in and around the neighbourhood. Another music video for the French rapper SCH's single "Gomorra" was recorded in the neighbourhood buildings.

Le Vele di Scampia is featured by poet and writer Emanuele Cerullo, a resident of one of the buildings. He describes through poetry the dreams and hopes of Scampia's adolescents, portraying a different view of living in this reality than that depicted by the media.

Gerald Seymour's 2009 novel The Collaborator uses this housing project as the setting for its denouement.

In 2021 Stanley Tucci filmed part of his first episode of his travel and food show in Scampia, featuring both Neapolitan cuisine and Romani cuisine.

== Notes and references ==
- Ghirardo, Diane (2014). Italy: Modern Architectures in History, London: Reaktion Books, ISBN 978-1-86189-864-7
