= Miano =

Coordinates: 40°50′N 14°19′E

- Quarter of Naples
- Location of Miano within Naples
- Country: Italy
- Region: Campania
- City: Naples
- Municipalità: 7th

Area
  - Total: 1.87 km^{2} (0.72 sq mi)

Population
  - Total: 23.896
  - Density: 12.8/km^{2} (33.1/sq mi)
- Demonym: mianesi
- Postal code: 80137

Miano is a quarter of Naples, Italy, with a population of around 24,000.

== History ==
Since the recent administrative reorganization of the area, Miano is part of the 7th community board.

== Geography ==
It borders to the north with the Scampia district (Cupa Carbone, Via del Gran Paradiso, Via del Cervino, Via Ettore Ciccotti, Via Don Luigi Guanella), to the east with Secondigliano (Via comune Acquarola, Corso Secondigliano, Via Abate Gioacchino, Via Monte Grappa, Via del Sabotino, Cupa called S. Cesarea, Cupa Capodichino, Via Vicinale Vallone di Miano), to the west with the Piscinola neighborhoods (Via Vicinale a Piscinola, Via Vecchia Miano a Piscinola, Via Giorgio Amendola, Via Vittorio Veneto, Via Rocco Marco di Torrepadula, Via Raffaele Marfella) and to the south with the San Carlo all'Arena district.

In the recent reform of the administrative structure of the Municipality, Miano, together with Secondigliano and San Pietro a Patierno, constitutes the VII Municipality of the Municipality of Naples.

=== Park of Bellaria ===
To get to Miano, you can take the street of the same name which starts from the roundabout of Capodimonte up to the Secondigliano crossroads. Via Miano is the Park of Bellaria.

== Economy and society ==
The area, though not as notorious as neighbouring Scampia, has many of the same problems. Unemployment is cited at about 30% to 50%, and there is a strong presence of the Camorra.

The economy is based on the tertiary sector, but until 2005 the large Peroni beer factory was active in Miano, offering work to hundreds of families. After the sale of the company, the plant was closed and awaits the implementation of a major project that aims to create a commercial-recreational center in the former industrial area, completed in 2018. The same situation grips the Villa Russo clinic for the well-known regional crisis that sees the health sector in the foreground.

A problem of the district, as well as of the entire city and province, is the presence of the Camorra which prevents its economic, social and civil take-off especially for young people who are often misled by the organization.

And it is within this problem that a group of people has entered to collaborate, to be present both as operators and as citizens, for the construction and promotion of interventions aimed at the needs of the minors of Miano. The opportunity was seized thanks to the "Granello di Senape" project born a year after the approval of law no. 216/1991 with the aim of offering the teenagers of the neighborhood the opportunity to learn a lawful profession. The project wanted to be a bet on the ability to produce alternatives to organized crime, without denying the social problems that arise but trying to solve them starting from the character resources of the boys.

The “G. Toniolo”, the Don Guanella Opera House and the “Obiettivo Uomo” Cooperative who have made available the premises suitable for the exercise of the professional practice (barman, tailoring, beautician, hairdresser, pizza chef, etc). In addition to training, the project provides for the possibility of carrying out an internship in affiliated companies and the possibility of participating in summer camps for younger children. The success of the project was such that the proposing association became a point of reference for all the territorial agencies that deal with minors at risk: from 1992 to 1997 about 600 young people found work.

== Infrastructure and transport ==
Public transport in Miano is entrusted to the bus lines operated by the ANM. The main station in the district is Miano, which operates for Line 1 of the Naples Metro and for the Naples–Aversa railway. Between 1902 and 1960 the city was connected with the center by a special branch of the Capodimonte tramways; between 1913 and 1976 there was also a station along the Alifana railway.

== Perspectives on Miano ==
Two stations of Line 1 are under construction in Miano: the first (coming from Piscinola) located in via Miano, the second in via Regina Margherita. The trains of the Arcobaleno line (MCNE) will also stop in both; in this way the district will be directly connected with the city and the province.

A project is envisaged for the construction of a craft citadel, sports facilities, commercial premises and quality housing in the area of the "Caretto" and "Boscariello" barracks, abandoned by the Ministry of Defense and previously designated as land for the new stadium of Napoli Calcio, an intention that was later wrecked. The new Security pole will be built in the Boscariello Barracks, which will house the offices of the State Police including the IV Mobile Department. More than 168 million euros have been allocated by the Conte government for the project. Project confirmed by the Draghi government which also appointed the Extraordinary Commissioner dr. Joseph D'Addato. According to estimates by the State property agency, the structure should be completed and operational by 2024.

== Famous people ==
- Giuseppe Tetamo
- Michele Salvatore Ciociano
- James Senese
- Mario Musella
- Salvatore Bocchetti
- Antonio Bocchetti
- Giuseppe Maddaloni
- Ugo d'Alessio
- Giuseppe Chiarolanza
- Serena Rossi

== Bibliography ==
- Valutazione degli interventi per tossicodipendenti e minori a rischio, 1995, Naples, Labos.
- Italia sera, February 28, 1996.
- Utile futile, January 24, 1995.
- TGR, November 18, 1994.
