= Secondigliano =

Quarter of Naples, Italy

Coordinates: 40°54′N 14°16′E

- Quarter of Naples
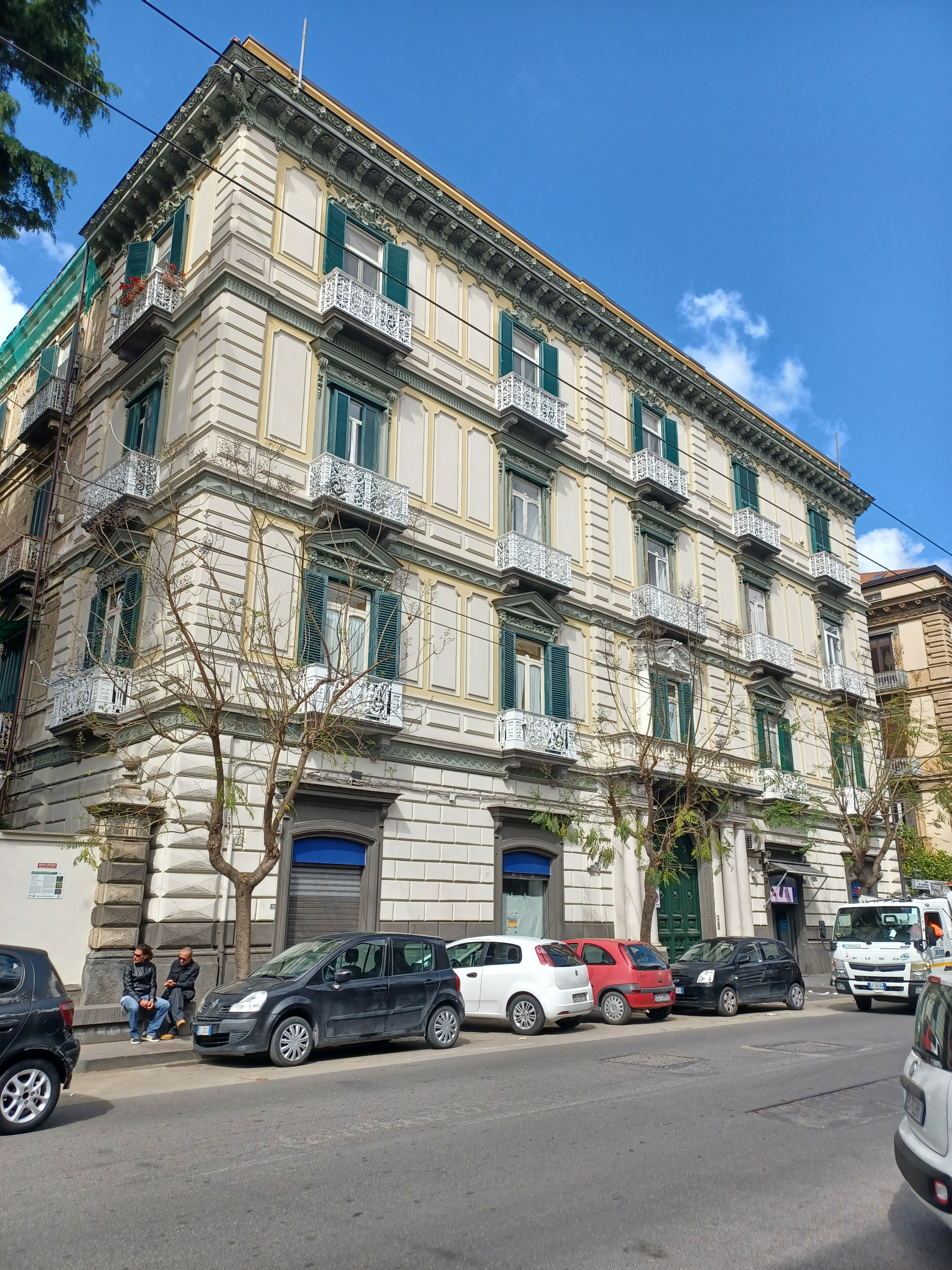
- Palazzo Carbonelli di Letino on Corso Secondigliano

- Location of Secondigliano within Naples
- Country: Italy
- Region: Campania
- City: Naples
- Municipalità: 7th

Area
  - Total: 2.94 km^{2} (1.14 sq mi)

Population
  - Total: 42,827
  - Density: 14,600/km^{2} (37,700/sq mi)
- Demonym: secondiglianesi
- Postal code: 80144

Secondigliano (Italian: [sekondiʎˈʎaːno]; Neapolitan: [sɛcɔndiʝˈʝɑːnə]) is a quarter in the north of Naples, Italy. It is part of the 7th municipality of Naples, along with the neighbourhoods of Miano and San Pietro a Patierno.

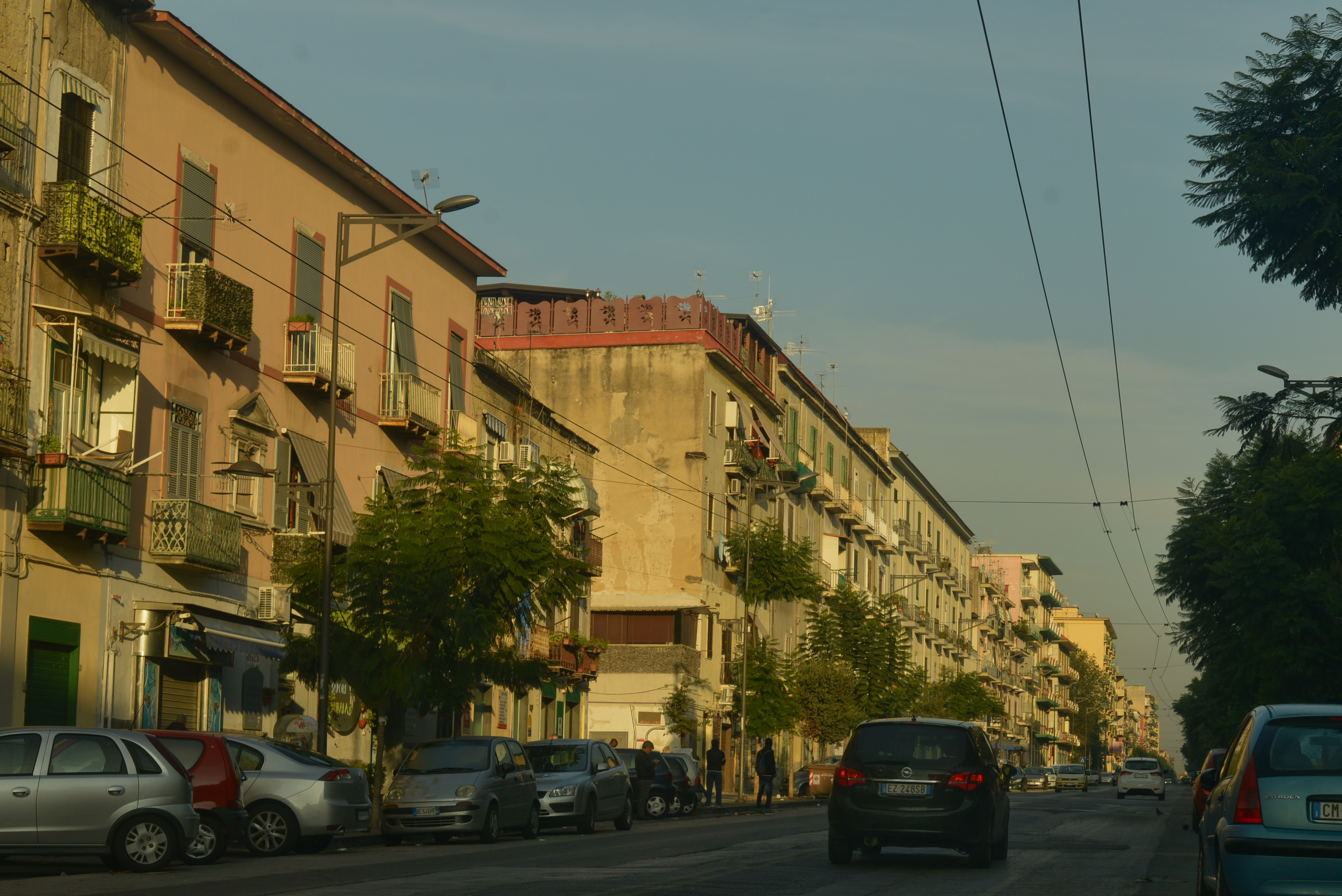
Corso Secondigliano, its main street, in 2017.

First documented in 1113 as a rural hamlet, the area developed thanks to its strategic location along important communication and transport routes. Now a densely populated urban neighbourhood, it underwent extensive urbanization in the decades following the World War II.

== Geography ==
Secondigliano lies between San Pietro a Patierno and Scampia. To the northwest it borders with the suburb of Scampia (Traversa Roma verso Scampia, via Roma verso Scampia, via Miano), to the west with the suburb of Miano (via comunale Acquarola, Corso Secondigliano, via Abate Gioacchino, via Monte Grappa, via del Sabotino, Cupa detta S. Cesarea, Cupa Capodichino, via Vicinale Vallone di Miano), to the south with the suburbs of San Carlo all'Arena (via comunale Vecchia di Miano, Piazza Di Vittorio) and San Pietro a Patierno (Piazza Di Vittorio, via Francesco De Pinedo, via provinciale di Caserta), to the north with the comune of Arzano, and to the northeast with the comune of Casavatore.

Piazza Capodichino marks the beginning of the route that, along Corso Secondigliano towards the Limitone di Arzano, intersects on the right with the Strada Comunale del Cassano. The latter, starting from Perrone, delineates the boundary between the territory of Secondigliano proper and the district of San Pietro a Patierno, as well as the municipality of Casavatore.

To the north, the border between Secondigliano and the municipality of Arzano is marked by the small church of San Gennaro, known as San Gennariello, located next to the farmhouse formerly owned by the Marquis of Montanaro, and by the chapel known as La Bruna. In front of the entrance to Perrone, a road leads to the district of Miano, where the ancient Parascandolo estate was once located; until the 19th century, this route led to the Dominican monastery of Madonna dell'Arco in Miano.

Secondigliano is predominantly situated on flat terrain, at an altitude of approximately 105 metres (344 ft) above sea level, covering an area of 12 square kilometres (4.6 sq mi). It is located about three miles from the Historic Centre of Naples and two kilometers from the comune of Casoria, which served as its district and administrative seat until the late 19th century.

== Etymology ==
The etymology of the toponym Secondigliano has given rise to various interpretations over time, reflecting the area's historical and cultural richness.

One of the most widely accepted theories suggests that the name derives from the Latin phrase secundus miliarium, meaning "second mile." Thus, Secondigliano would be a contraction of "secondo" (second) and "miglio" (mile), referring to the district's location two miles from the city's center, as marked by the second milestone of the Via Atellana or Via Capuana (the ancient road to Capua). This was an important Campanian road established during the Osco-Etruscan-Samnite period, connecting Capua with Atella and Naples, passing through Capodichino and Secondigliano.

Alternatively, according to some historians, the name may originate from the Roman gens Secondii or Secondilii.

Some scholars also suggest that the toponym could derive from the Colli Secondili, geographical elevations located in the northern part of the district, indicating a topographical connection to the surrounding territory. Although less widespread, this hypothesis adds a geophysical dimension to the origin of the name.

The earliest official documentary mention of the name dates back to October 19, 1113, during the seventh indiction, under the reign of Byzantine Emperor Alexios I Komnenos. A lease contract from that time refers to a property located in a place called Villa Secundillani. This villa was a royal hamlet of the city of Naples. Moreover, the source praised the area for being a plain with pure air. Later, in documents from the reign of Charles II of Anjou, the place is mentioned as Secundillyanum. In the archbishop's holy visit of August 29, 1542, it is referred to as Casale Secondigliani, while in the visit of June 3, 1612, it appears as Secundigliani. A volume from 1640 records the name as Secondilliano and Secondigliano. These linguistic variations attest to the phonetic and morphological evolution of the toponym over the centuries.

== History ==
The original nucleus of Secondigliano corresponds to the current area bounded by Piazza Zanardelli, Via dell'Arco, Via Gaetano Enrico, and Via Vittorio Emanuele III. Since the period of Spanish rule, the village has been recognized as a prosperous agricultural center, characterized by extensive orchards and vineyards, although its wine production was of modest quality. This agricultural village, which maintained its vocation until the 1950s, also served as a vacation destination for those, especially from the historic city of Naples, who sought respite or wished to benefit from its favorable climate.

Among the scholars who have studied Secondigliano, Domenico Chianese, in 1938, included it among the 37 hamlets annexed to the city of Naples, which enjoyed specific privileges and prerogatives. More specifically, he classified it among the 10 hamlets located beyond the Capodichino hill. Ambrosi, on the other hand, described the village as situated 99 meters above sea level, characterized by healthy air and a population noted for its exceptional longevity. He also highlighted the presence of wide, well-paved, and regularly arranged streets, as well as an abundance of fountains, with water sourced from the Serino aqueduct and efficiently distributed to all households. Finally, he reaffirmed that the area had existed since at least the 8th century.

=== 15th Century ===
The area was a feudal holding in the Middle Ages, then a Casale (farmhouse) and was not part of the city of Naples until the Fascist period.

The reorganization of Naples' casali was initiated following the Angevin reclamation of the Paduli, a vast marshland extending from the hills of Capodichino to Poggioreale, within the pagliese territory. This reclamation project, which targeted both royal agricultural lands and those already enfeoffed, aimed to foster the development of previously uninhabited or unproductive areas. In this context, a significant portion of Secondigliano’s territory underwent canalization interventions.

The reclamation efforts continued during the Aragonese period, between 1451 and 1458, with a focus not only on draining the marshes but also on regulating water flow through an advanced canalization system. During this phase, geometric land divisions emerged as part of rural rationalization, shaping the layout of the Censi (landholdings). The morphology of the area was thus influenced by both water management and the fragmentation of original land ownership into smaller units.

By the late 15th century, the city of Naples encompassed 43 casali, including Secondigliano. These settlements were distinguished by their thriving production of linen and silk, which were processed locally before being transported to Naples. Similarly, agricultural goods—including wheat, fruit, and their derivatives such as wine and bread—were processed within the masserie (rural estates), ensuring the sustenance of the local population. However, a substantial portion of these resources constituted a tribute to the Kingdom. Additionally, each casale was required to maintain a slaughterhouse, while animal products such as milk, cheese, and meat were traded both in Naples' markets and within designated areas of the casale itself.

=== 16th Century: From Hamlet to Casale ===
Before officially acquiring the status of a casale, Secondigliano was referred to as a caseggiato, a term reflecting its common origins with other casali—settlements that emerged for economic purposes and were characterized by a limited number of dwellings scattered irregularly across the territory. Among these, certain noble residences stood out, shaping a settlement akin to a small borough. It was only through an administrative reorganization that the caseggiato was formally recognized as a casale.

Throughout both phases of its development, Secondigliano’s population primarily consisted of artisans and farmers, bound by servitude to the royal court or the kingdom’s noble families. The transition from caseggiato to casale was marked by an exemption from the focatico tax—a levy imposed on each household unit. This exemption, initiated during the Aragonese period and completed in 1505 under Ferdinand II of Aragon, was a pivotal moment in Secondigliano’s growth.

The abolition of this tax led to a significant demographic increase. While still economically dependent on the ruling class, the inhabitants leveraged available resources to acquire arable land and build their own homes. This transformation profoundly impacted the local agricultural system, ushering in a new phase of economic and social development.

At the time, Naples developed within its city walls, while the surrounding rural areas were progressively divided into casali. Historian Pietro Summonte, in his work on Naples and its kingdom, identified 37 casali, known in Latin as vichi or paghi, which were administratively linked to the city and enjoyed specific privileges or civil immunities. These casali were distributed across four areas: along the coast, in the hinterland, between Capodichino and Capodimonte, and on the slopes of Posillipo.

The first substantial development of Secondigliano, which until then had been isolated by dense vegetation, coincided with the construction of the Capodichino Road (1582–1586). This road, the main entrance to Naples at the time, facilitated trade and communication between the city and the northern plains. The project was carried out during the Viceroyalty of Pedro Téllez-Girón, 1st Duke of Osuna. Before 1585, Secondigliano was largely inaccessible, and contemporary descriptions of the Capodichino area depicted it as a forested zone plagued by brigands.

Nevertheless, the earliest settlement in Secondigliano dates back to the 8th century, centered around the Church of Saints Cosmas and Damian. Originally built in the same period, the church was almost entirely reconstructed in 1695 and is located in today’s Piazza Luigi di Nocera—historically known as Piazza del Casale. Secondigliano was officially listed among the casali of Naples under Charles I of Anjou and Charles II of Naples but was absent from records under Frederick II of Swabia.

During the medieval period, the governance of the casale was based on feudal relations. The land was owned by monastic orders or nobles and was leased to prominent families of the kingdom for cultivation and settlement. These families, in turn, sublet portions of the land to local farmers, who produced only enough to sustain themselves, while the landowners and primary leaseholders benefited from agricultural yields.

By the 12th century, this system was already well established in Secondigliano, shaping its urban morphology and architectural characteristics—some of which remain visible today. However, the true expansion of the casale only began in the late 16th century, following the opening of the Capodichino Road in 1585.

These feudal arrangements also influenced the structure of the masserie, which were not merely residential buildings or agricultural estates but comprehensive agricultural units. The first tier of the feudal lease system involved the landowner granting the entire estate to leaseholders, while the second tier saw leaseholders subdivide the estate among farmers, who were given plots of land, housing units, and farming equipment.

=== 17th Century: Economic Growth ===
During the 17th century, Secondigliano was characterized by numerous masserie, which, together with key administrative buildings, formed the casale. The local economy was predominantly based on agriculture, supported by the exceptional fertility of the soil. The Casale di Secondigliano, which later evolved into an Universitas (a self-governing municipal entity), hosted one of the most active agricultural markets in the Naples area, located in what is now Piazza Luigi di Nocera. This market supplied Naples with high-quality agricultural products, including fruit, wheat, peas, strawberries, barley, wine, and mulberries.

Mulberry cultivation was particularly significant along the ancient Via Appia, which connected Secondigliano to Melito. This fostered a thriving silk industry, producing some of the finest silk in the Kingdom of Naples. The silk woven in Naples’ casali was highly prized and widely sought after. Secondigliano’s residents were known for their industriousness and commercial acumen, with many traveling abroad to sell textiles in international markets. A notable figure was Maria Marseglia, mother of Saint Gaetano Errico, who was a weaver of woolen fabrics. The cultivation of hemp and flax also flourished in the casale, with women primarily engaged in textile production while men handled trade and export.

The casale was also renowned for its pork industry, particularly the production of the famed Salame di Secondigliano, which gained international recognition.

However, the casale suffered a drastic population decline following the 1656 plague, which devastated the Viceroyalty of Naples, reducing the population by up to a third. The crisis was further compounded by two catastrophic earthquakes: one in 1688, which claimed approximately 10,000 lives in the Sannio region, and another in 1694, which resulted in over 6,000 deaths in Irpinia and Basilicata.

In response to these calamities, the community resolved in 1695 to construct a new parish church, as the existing one, built in the early 16th century, had suffered severe damage. The project was funded through popular contributions, the Congregazione del Santissimo Sacramento, and ecclesiastical donations. Construction commenced in 1703 and was completed the following year.

In 1721, the old bell tower was demolished to make way for a new structure, which remains intact to this day.

=== 18th Century ===
Secondigliano has historically been the site of numerous capital executions, particularly during the early decades of the 18th century, as documented in marriage and death registers from that period. These executions, primarily carried out by hanging, took place in the square of Capodichino, a location that still exists today and is now known as Piazza Giuseppe Di Vittorio. This area also serves as a boundary between Secondigliano and the modern district of San Carlo all'Arena.

The structures designated for such executions were erected at the site where, in the 19th century, the so-called Tempietto di Marte (Temple of Mars) would later be constructed. This monument, severely damaged during World War II, was subsequently replaced by a white marble pillar inscribed with the names of fallen soldiers. Death sentences were issued by a commissioner of the countryside, who resided alternately in Capua or Naples. Crimes punishable by execution included theft in public places, arson, extortion, and acts of piracy.

In 1784, Russo, a prominent elementary school teacher and cultural figure, described Secondigliano as a locus amoenus—a picturesque and pleasant retreat. Traditionally favored as a destination for vacations and thermal treatments since antiquity, the hamlet, located in the immediate vicinity of Naples, provided an ideal refuge from the city's relentless bustle, offering a serene and lush environment.

Secondigliano was also renowned for the extraordinary fertility of its lands, nourished by the rivers and streams that coursed through the surrounding valleys. Numerous noble villas, adorned with well-manicured gardens and expansive terraces, accommodated Naples' elite, including aristocrats and wealthy merchants, who sought respite from the oppressive summer heat and urban squalor. These residences were often encircled by citrus orchards and vineyards, while local farmers, diligently tending the fields, contributed significantly to Naples' food supply.

The revolutionary upheaval of the Neapolitan Republic in 1799 triggered widespread social unrest in Secondigliano, causing divisions within families and profound transformations in the local social fabric—effects that would persist for several decades. The hamlet actively participated in these events, with demonstrations in support of revolutionary ideals. Jacobin slogans advocating for liberty and equality, including Viva la libertà e l’uguaglianza (Long live liberty and equality), appeared on the walls of buildings.

Simultaneously, new political formations inspired by French revolutionary principles emerged, although their presence was short-lived, and they quickly faded into obscurity.

During the 18th century, the governance of the hamlet adhered to the same administrative regulations as Naples, while retaining a degree of local autonomy. Over time, however, the traditional obligation for Secondigliano’s residents to provide service to the capital—a duty dating back to the ducal period—gradually diminished and was eventually abandoned.

=== 19th Century ===
The neighborhood is described in the Dizionario geografico-ragionato del Regno di Napoli (Geographical Dictionary of the Kingdom of Naples) as follows:

Royal farmhouse of the city of Naples, approximately 3 miles away, located in a plain with good air, but very humid at sunset. The oldest record we have of this farmhouse dates back to October 19 of the 7th century, under Emperor Alexios, mentioned in our city’s documents, which include the lease of a plot in the 'Secundillani' villa. In two other diplomas from the era of Charles II, it is called 'Secundillyanum,' but it is not listed among the farmhouses of our city under Emperor Frederick II. Its territory covers 2800 moggia and is very fertile; in fact, it is known for fruit production. Its main church, dedicated to Saints Cosmas and Damian, has a robust but unfinished bell tower. Its population numbers around 6000, most of whom are engaged in agriculture, and among them are those who live beyond 100 years.

Studies on the toponymy of these areas indicate that until 1799, part of the district belonged to the Monastery of Saints Sergius and Bacchus, which was later annexed to the Monastery of Saint Sebastian. This ownership was limited to the small area known as Perrone. Meanwhile, the so-called Terra dei Lazzari in Capodichino was recorded as property of the Ebdomadari of the Naples Cathedral.

Regarding the area where Vicolo and Vicoletto San Gaetano Errico are located, the land was registered as an annuity in favor of the venerable Monastery of Saint Francis of Paola in Borgo Sant'Antonio Abate. A farmstead with shrubs and vineyards, situated between Via dell’Arco and Piazza Zanardelli, was listed among the holdings of the Royal Monastery of Saint Peter Martyr al Pendino.

The Fossa del Lupo was owned by the Governors of the Pio Monte di Misericordia. Scampia, referred to as Sette Ponti, was included in the real estate and territorial assets of the Community of Jesus delle Monache, as were the farmsteads belonging to the Monastery of Santa Maria in Donnaromita in Spaccanapoli.

At the beginning of the 19th century, the outdated Universitas institutions were abolished and converted into autonomous municipalities.

During the 19th century and the early 20th century, the municipality of Secondigliano experienced significant demographic and economic growth. The presence of numerous factories, combined with the advent of steam-powered machinery for textile production, not only generated greater employment but also significantly shaped the architectural landscape. Economic prosperity encouraged local merchants to expand their businesses beyond national borders, strengthening Secondigliano’s role in the economic framework of the time.

The economic boom, largely driven by industries such as textile mills, pasta factories, and various manufacturing plants, led to a notable expansion along the district’s main thoroughfare. Once known as Corso Napoli, it was later renamed Corso Umberto I and is now Corso Secondigliano.

Among the most prominent industrial enterprises in Secondigliano were the Improta and Barbato pasta factories, the cheese-making firm of the Baroni Carbonelli di Letino, whose Carbonelli IGP provolone is still produced and marketed today by the Zanetti company, the Simonetti glassworks, and the cotton mills owned by the di Nocera family.

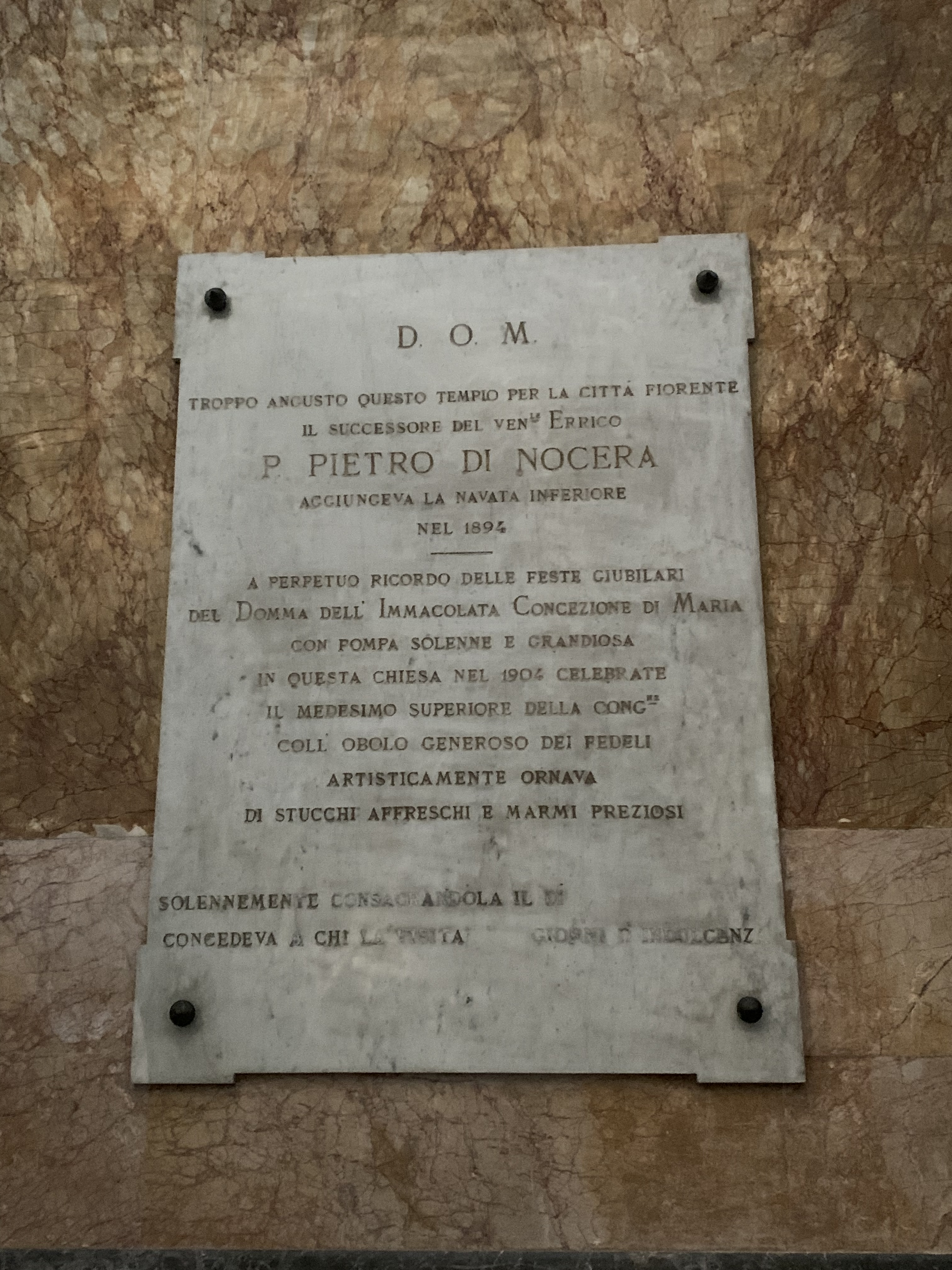
Commemorative plaque honoring Pietro di Nocera and the citizens for their contribution to the expansion and embellishment of the Church of the Addolorata.

In 1883, the di Nocera family also established one of the first Italian banche popolari (cooperative banks), headquartered in Secondigliano, to combat usury and provide further stimulus to the local economy.

This period of economic expansion was also reflected in urban development, with the construction of prestigious buildings along the district’s main thoroughfare.

The influx of nobles, local bourgeoisie, landowners, merchants, and intellectuals—along with a segment of the Neapolitan middle class that moved from the city center to the suburbs—was instrumental in promoting a neoclassical and neo-Renaissance architectural style. This refined yet elegant aesthetic was complemented by lavish gardens adorned with statues, fountains, and ornamental plants.

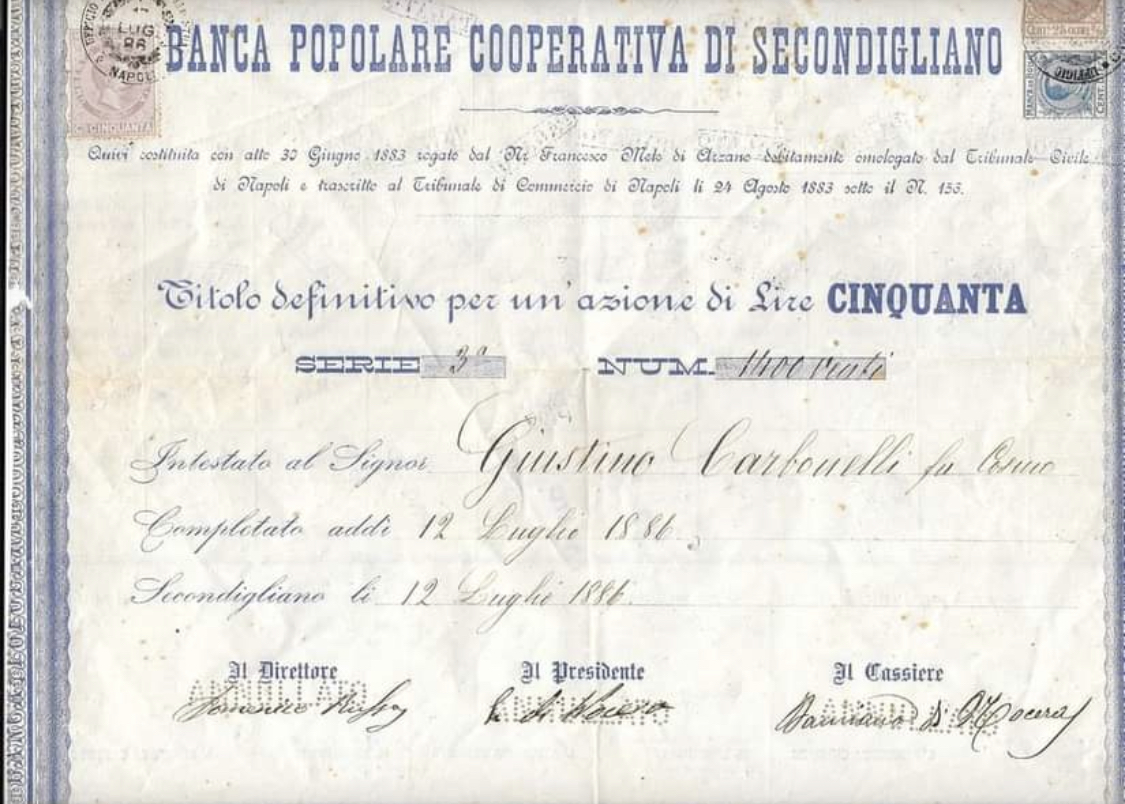
A share certificate of the Banca Popolare di Secondigliano, 1883.

Among the most striking examples of this architectural evolution are the palazzi that still stand as symbols of this golden age. The palazzo at No. 148, built in 1890, and the palazzo at No. 165, dating from 1889, showcase the stylistic refinement of the period, while the palazzo at No. 264, completed in 1870, is distinguished by architectural motifs reminiscent of the work of Ferdinando Sanfelice. It was this very building that, in 1883, was selected as the headquarters of the Banca Popolare di Secondigliano, underscoring the district’s financial stability and its newfound economic prominence.

=== 20th Century ===
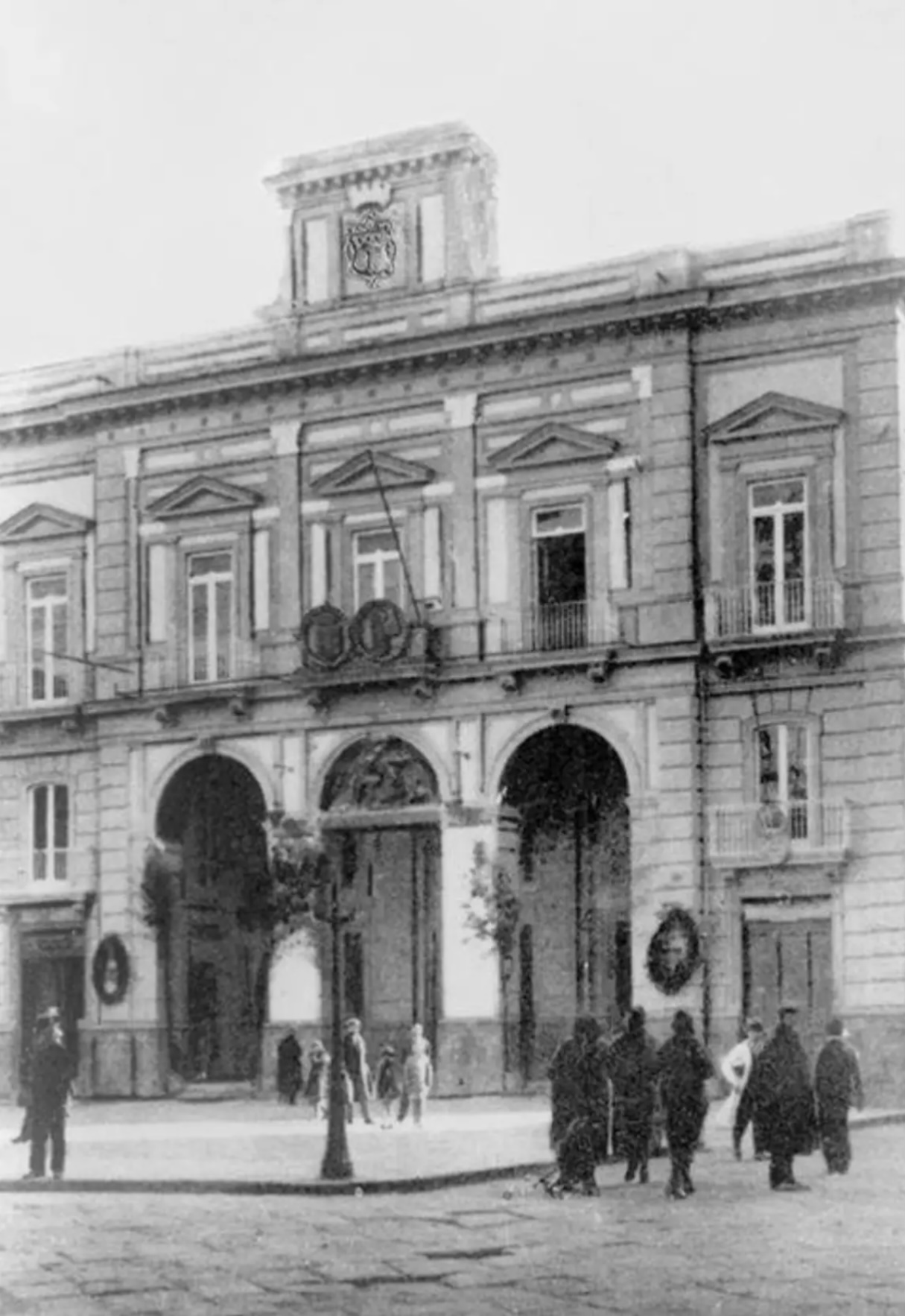
Municipal building located in Piazza Luigi di Nocera, built by the eponymous count in 1883. Image from 1890.

After the Restoration, the rural settlements that had not yet been incorporated into the city became suburban municipalities. Secondigliano was an autonomous municipality (including Scampia) from March 17, 1861, to July 3, 1926, before being merged with the municipality of Naples, becoming its fifteenth district during Mussolini's fascist dictatorship in 1926.

Secondigliano was once a village characterized by bucolic tranquility, as lyrically described by Arturo Capasso, a local-born writer. He depicted this area as a "fertile and bountiful land," rich in life and natural resources.

In the gardens, there were little goats, while pigeons nested on the terraces. But there were also chickens in the gardens, and I quickly learned how to tell if they had laid an egg. They had to be isolated, and a sort of stocking had to be placed around their beaks; otherwise, they would peck at the freshly laid egg. It was a simple, orderly world—many people rode bicycles. There were four or five families of major merchants and small industrialists, then a middle class, and finally a very poor population that lived near the cemetery, in the area known as 'dei Censi.'

— Arturo Capasso

During the 19th century and the early 20th century, the municipality of Secondigliano experienced significant demographic and economic growth. The presence of numerous factories, coinciding with the advent of new steam machines for fabric processing, not only generated greater employment but also significantly shaped the architectural landscape. The economic fervor, primarily due to industrial activities such as cotton mills, pasta factories, and various other establishments, led to notable urban expansion along the street formerly known as Corso Napoli, later renamed Corso Umberto I, and today called Corso Secondigliano. Among the major industries in Secondigliano were the Improta and Barbato pasta factories, the cheese company of the Baroni Carbonelli di Letino, whose "Carbonelli IGP" provolone is still produced and marketed by the Zanetti company, and the cotton mills owned by the Nocera family. The latter also established one of the first people's banks in Italy in 1883, headquartered in Secondigliano, to combat usury and further boost the city's economy.

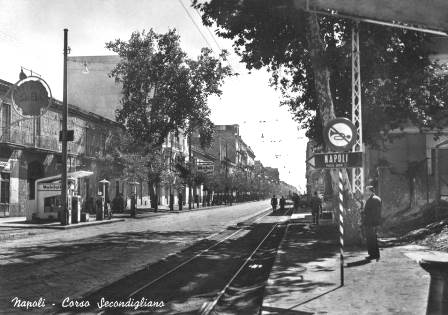
Corso Secondigliano in the early 20th century.

The influx of nobles, local bourgeoisie, landowners, merchants, and intellectuals, along with a segment of the Neapolitan bourgeoisie that left the city center for the suburbs, was thus crucial in promoting a sober and elegant neoclassical and neo-Renaissance architecture. This architectural style was accompanied by expensive gardens adorned with plants, statues, and fountains.

In the final months of World War II, in 1945, the district of Secondigliano suffered from a severe food shortage. A significant event from this period involved a group of partisans from the Vomero district who traveled to Secondigliano to retrieve supplies from a large mill located near the present-day Via De Pinedo, not far from the Capodichino airfield, which was then occupied by German troops (now Naples International Airport). Despite the difficulties of the operation, the mission was successful, allowing the local population to obtain several rations of bread and temporarily alleviating the food crisis.

Until the 1950s, Secondigliano retained its characteristics as a rural village, becoming a favored destination for family outings among Neapolitans. The district was appreciated for its fresh air and numerous traditional trattorias.

In the post-war period, Secondigliano underwent a profound transformation of its urban fabric, driven by intense private and public construction activity. With the completion of the grid-like residential settlement adjacent to Via De Pinedo, numerous public housing projects were developed in the 1950s and 1960s. Among the most notable residential complexes built during this period were the Rione Berlingieri and the Rione INA-Casa along Corso Secondigliano towards Scampia. Later, following the approval of Law No. 167 of April 18, 1962, the northwestern area of Secondigliano saw the development of a working-class district that would eventually become part of the Scampia administrative division and later an independent district.

During the 1960s and 1970s, significant urban expansion occurred, often exceeding the provisions of the existing regulatory plan. Some areas adjacent to the historic center saw unauthorized construction, such as the Rione Kennedy and, later, certain zones near Corso Italia, in violation of the 1972 zoning plan.

In 1976, Secondigliano was included in the Piano delle Periferie (Periphery Plan), an urban intervention program affecting the entire northern belt of Naples. This plan was later revised and expanded through the Programma Straordinario di Edilizia Residenziale (PSER, Extraordinary Residential Building Program), developed in response to the 1980 Irpinia earthquake. Despite certain challenges, including management issues and architectural inconsistencies, these initiatives represented an initial attempt at urban modernization, aligning with the principles of Third-Generation Urban Planning.

During the 1980s and 1990s, urban interventions focused on the redevelopment of the Censi area through conservation efforts, completion projects, and building replacements. Additionally, a new working-class neighborhood, Rione dei Fiori, was established, hosting key administrative functions such as the municipal office, the local health authority (ASL), and the headquarters of the municipal police. These initiatives contributed to the progressive urban regeneration of Secondigliano, shaping the district's long-term development.

In 1973, the Claudio Villa club was inaugurated on Corso Secondigliano, with the presence of the renowned singer and actor himself.

Most of the buildings in the district date back to the 1970s and 1980s, following the first major wave of urbanization that began in the 1950s. The district's design also saw contributions from the organic architect Piero Maria Lugli.

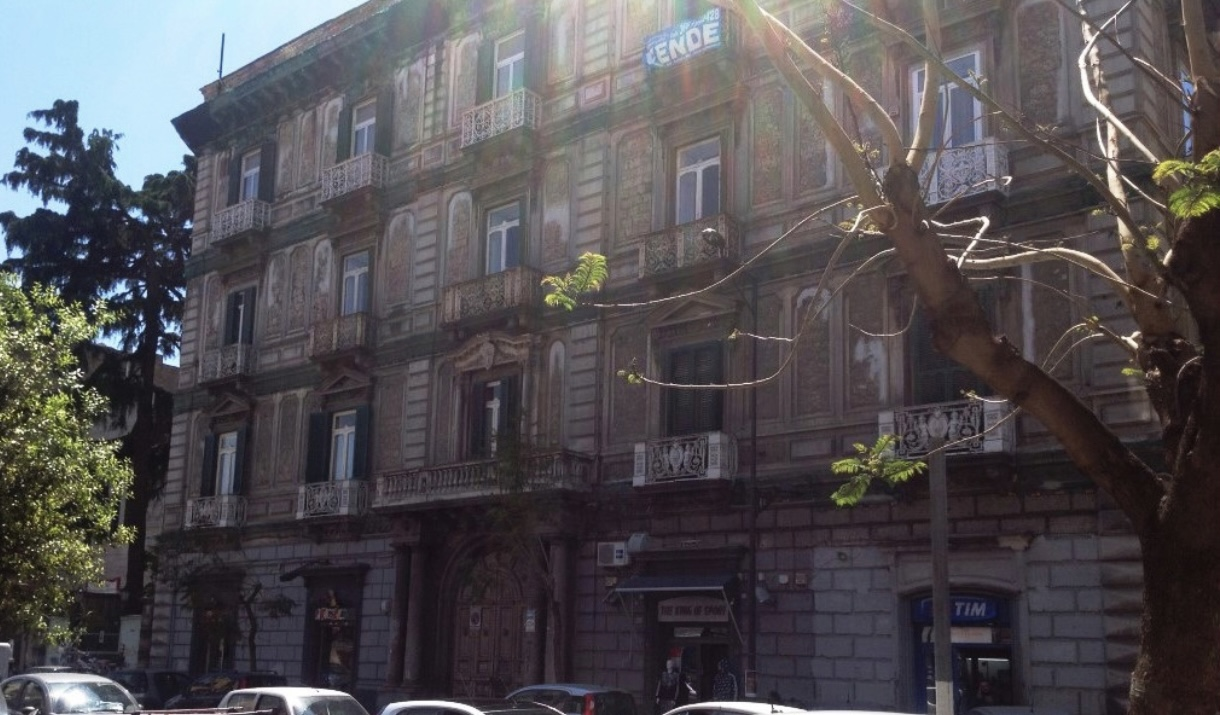
Palazzo dei Baroni Carbonelli di Letino, Secondigliano, Naples.

Very well known was the Secondigliano tragedy, on 23 January 1996, when 11 people died.

== Transport ==
The Secondigliano neighborhood is served by the Tangenziale di Napoli via the exit of the same name. The main thoroughfare of the neighborhood is Corso Secondigliano, which connects Piazza Giuseppe Di Vittorio with the hinterland. Between 1882 and 1959, this artery hosted the tracks of the Naples-Aversa/Giugliano tramway, managed by the Société Anonyme des Tramways Provinciaux (SATP). Additionally, the area was served by a terminal for the so-called Capodimonte trams from 1907 to 1960, and by the Secondigliano station of the lower Alifana railway from 1913 to 1976.

Public transportation is provided by ANM for urban, suburban, and interurban connections. As of 2024, the Secondigliano, Regina Margherita, and Di Vittorio stations of Naples Metro Line 1 are under construction, which will serve Corso Secondigliano, Piazza Di Vittorio (better known as Piazza Capodichino), and the Naples International Airport.

== See also ==
- Quarters of Naples
- Secondigliano station
