= San Pietro a Patierno =

Suburb of Naples, Italy

Coordinates: 40°53′32.6″N 14°17′14.2″E

- Quarter of Naples
- Location of San Pietro a Patierno within Naples
- Country: Italy
- Region: Campania
- City: Naples
- Municipalità: 7th

Area
  - Total: 5.45 km^{2} (2.10 sq mi)

Population
  - Total: 17,324
  - Density: 3,180/km^{2} (8,230/sq mi)
- Demonym: sanpietrini
- Postal code: 80144

San Pietro a Patierno is a quarter of Naples, the regional capital of Campania, Italy.

== Geography ==
It is one of the largest suburbs of Naples and is relatively lightly populated compared to surrounding areas, with around 20,000 residents. The district of Capodichino includes Naples International Airport, the Ugo Niutta military airport, and the US Naval Support Activity where the United States Sixth Fleet has its home base.

== History ==
Historically, the area was a feudal holding under the Angevin rule of Naples in the Middle Ages and called by its Latin name, Sanctus Petrus ad Peternum. It was abolished as a fief by Murat in the early 19th century and finally incorporated into the city of Naples during the Fascist period.
