= List of municipalities of the Metropolitan City of Naples =

The following is a list of the 92 municipalities (comuni) of the Metropolitan City of Naples in the region of Campania in Italy.

== List ==
Municipality	Population (2026)	Area (km²)	Density
Acerra	58,585	54.71	1,070.8
Afragola	61,581	17.91	3,438.4
Agerola	7,844	19.83	395.6
Anacapri	6,746	6.47	1,042.7
Arzano	31,613	4.71	6,711.9
Bacoli	24,783	13.47	1,839.9
Barano d'Ischia	9,953	10.96	908.1
Boscoreale	25,645	11.35	2,259.5
Boscotrecase	9,796	7.53	1,300.9
Brusciano	16,149	5.62	2,873.5
Caivano	35,886	27.22	1,318.4
Calvizzano	12,869	4.01	3,209.2
Camposano	5,010	3.33	1,504.5
Capri	6,705	4.06	1,651.5
Carbonara di Nola	2,463	3.65	674.8
Cardito	21,434	3.21	6,677.3
Casalnuovo di Napoli	46,663	7.83	5,959.5
Casamarciano	2,990	6.38	468.7
Casamicciola Terme	7,361	5.85	1,258.3
Casandrino	13,055	3.19	4,092.5
Casavatore	18,244	1.53	11,924.2
Casola di Napoli	3,598	2.59	1,389.2
Casoria	73,257	12.13	6,039.3
Castellammare di Stabia	61,937	17.81	3,477.7
Castello di Cisterna	7,855	3.92	2,003.8
Cercola	16,702	4.23	3,948.5
Cicciano	12,342	7.33	1,683.8
Cimitile	6,907	2.74	2,520.8
Comiziano	1,665	2.45	679.6
Crispano	11,566	2.22	5,209.9
Ercolano	49,179	19.89	2,472.5
Forio	17,464	13.08	1,335.2
Frattamaggiore	28,677	5.37	5,340.2
Frattaminore	15,412	2.05	7,518.0
Giugliano in Campania	125,018	94.62	1,321.3
Gragnano	27,420	14.64	1,873.0
Grumo Nevano	17,057	2.88	5,922.6
Ischia	19,415	8.14	2,385.1
Lacco Ameno	4,469	2.08	2,148.6
Lettere	6,019	12.02	500.7
Liveri	1,474	2.71	543.9
Marano di Napoli	57,631	15.64	3,684.8
Mariglianella	8,047	3.26	2,468.4
Marigliano	29,496	22.58	1,306.3
Massa di Somma	4,933	3.04	1,622.7
Massa Lubrense	14,116	19.84	711.5
Melito di Napoli	36,156	3.81	9,489.8
Meta	7,855	2.25	3,491.1
Monte di Procida	11,735	3.70	3,171.6
Mugnano di Napoli	35,506	5.25	6,763.0
Naples	905,050	119.02	7,604.2
Nola	34,064	39.19	869.2
Ottaviano	23,364	20.02	1,167.0
Palma Campania	16,254	20.67	786.4
Piano di Sorrento	12,136	7.34	1,653.4
Pimonte	5,883	12.54	469.1
Poggiomarino	22,803	13.20	1,727.5
Pollena Trocchia	12,654	8.02	1,577.8
Pomigliano d'Arco	39,607	11.71	3,382.3
Pompei	23,517	12.42	1,893.5
Portici	51,213	4.60	11,133.3
Pozzuoli	74,665	43.44	1,718.8
Procida	9,971	4.26	2,340.6
Qualiano	24,799	7.43	3,337.7
Quarto	41,531	14.16	2,933.0
Roccarainola	6,463	28.33	228.1
San Gennaro Vesuviano	12,164	7.01	1,735.2
San Giorgio a Cremano	41,585	4.11	10,118.0
San Giuseppe Vesuviano	30,550	14.17	2,156.0
San Paolo Bel Sito	3,358	2.95	1,138.3
San Sebastiano al Vesuvio	8,571	2.65	3,234.3
San Vitaliano	6,580	5.37	1,225.3
Sant'Agnello	8,425	4.15	2,030.1
Sant'Anastasia	25,999	18.74	1,387.4
Sant'Antimo	32,516	5.90	5,511.2
Sant'Antonio Abate	18,766	7.93	2,366.5
Santa Maria la Carità	11,902	3.98	2,990.5
Saviano	16,063	13.88	1,157.3
Scisciano	6,371	5.50	1,158.4
Serrara Fontana	3,065	6.44	475.9
Somma Vesuviana	33,225	30.65	1,084.0
Sorrento	14,949	9.96	1,500.9
Striano	9,266	7.65	1,211.2
Terzigno	17,373	23.50	739.3
Torre Annunziata	39,496	7.54	5,238.2
Torre del Greco	78,839	30.63	2,573.9
Trecase	8,522	6.21	1,372.3
Tufino	3,350	5.21	643.0
Vico Equense	20,133	29.38	685.3
Villaricca	31,482	6.88	4,575.9
Visciano	4,119	10.90	377.9
Volla	25,921	6.20	4,180.8

== See also ==
- List of municipalities of Campania
- List of municipalities of Italy
