= Casandrino =

- Comune
- Comune di Casandrino
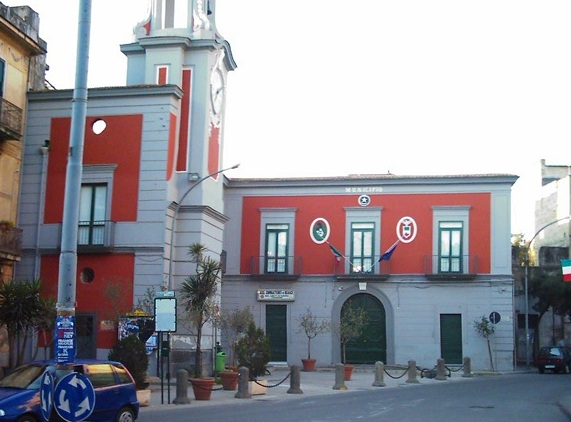
- Town hall.

- Coat of arms

- Location within Italy Location within Campania
- Coordinates: 40°56′N 14°15′E
- Country: Italy
- Region: Campania
- Metropolitan city: Naples (NA)

Government
  - Mayor: Rosa Marrazzo

Area
  - Total: 3.2 km^{2} (1.2 sq mi)
- Elevation: 84 m (276 ft)

Population (31 March 2016)
  - Total: 14,308
  - Density: 4,500/km^{2} (12,000/sq mi)
- Demonym: Casandrinesi
- Time zone: UTC+1 (CET)
  - Summer (DST): UTC+2 (CEST)
- Postal code: 80025
- Dialing code: 081

Casandrino is a comune (municipality) in the Metropolitan City of Naples in the Italian region Campania, located about 11 km (6.8 mi) north of Naples.

Casandrino borders the following municipalities: Arzano, Grumo Nevano, Melito di Napoli, Naples, Sant'Antimo.
