= Mariglianella =

- Comune
- Comune di Mariglianella
- Location within Italy Location within Campania
- Coordinates: 40°55′N 14°26′E
- Country: Italy
- Region: Campania
- Metropolitan city: Naples (NA)

Area
  - Total: 3.2 km^{2} (1.2 sq mi)

Population (31-7-2022)
  - Total: 7,729
  - Density: 2,400/km^{2} (6,300/sq mi)
- Time zone: UTC+1 (CET)
  - Summer (DST): UTC+2 (CEST)
- Postal code: 80030
- Dialing code: 081

Mariglianella is a comune (municipality) in the Metropolitan City of Naples in the Italian region Campania, located about 20 km (12 mi) northeast of Naples. As of 31-7-2022, it had a population of 7,729 and an area of 3.2 km^{2} (1.2 sq mi).

Mariglianella borders the following municipalities: Brusciano, Marigliano.

== Demographic evolution ==
Historical population

Year	Pop.	±%
1861	2,338	—
1871	2,491	+6.5%
1881	2,545	+2.2%
1901	2,550	+0.2%
1911	2,669	+4.7%

Year	Pop.	±%
1921	2,510	−6.0%
1931	2,818	+12.3%
1936	2,996	+6.3%
1951	3,689	+23.1%
1961	3,863	+4.7%

Year	Pop.	±%
1971	4,088	+5.8%
1981	4,645	+13.6%
1991	5,393	+16.1%
2001	6,199	+14.9%

Source: Data from ISTAT

=== Twin towns – sister cities ===
Mariglianella is twinned with:

- A Coruña, Spain
