= Cicciano =

- Comune
- Comune di Cicciano
- Coat of arms

- Location within Italy Location within Campania
- Coordinates: 40°58′N 14°32′E
- Country: Italy
- Region: Campania
- Metropolitan city: Naples (NA)

Government
  - Mayor: Raffaele Arvonio

Area
  - Total: 7.1 km^{2} (2.7 sq mi)
- Elevation: 52 m (171 ft)

Population (1 March 2010)
  - Total: 12,246
  - Density: 1,700/km^{2} (4,500/sq mi)
- Demonym: Ciccianesi
- Time zone: UTC+1 (CET)
  - Summer (DST): UTC+2 (CEST)
- Postal code: 80033
- Dialing code: 081
- Website: Official website

Cicciano is a comune (municipality) in the Metropolitan City of Naples in the Italian region Campania, located about 30 km (19 mi) northeast of Naples.

Cicciano borders the following municipalities: Camposano, Comiziano, Nola, Roccarainola, Tufino.
