= Tufino =

- Comune
- Comune di Tufino
- Coat of arms

- Location within Italy Location within Campania
- Coordinates: 40°57′N 14°34′E
- Country: Italy
- Region: Campania
- Metropolitan city: Naples (NA)
- Frazioni: Schiava, Risigliano, Vignola

Government
  - Mayor: Antonio Mascolo

Area
  - Total: 5.2 km^{2} (2.0 sq mi)

Population (31 December 2004)
  - Total: 3,420
  - Density: 660/km^{2} (1,700/sq mi)
- Time zone: UTC+1 (CET)
  - Summer (DST): UTC+2 (CEST)
- Postal code: 80030
- Dialing code: 081
- Patron saint: St. Bartholomew
- Saint day: August 24

Tufino is a town and comune (municipality) of c. 3,400 inhabitants in the Metropolitan City of Naples in the Italian region Campania, located about 30 km (19 mi) northeast of Naples.

Tufino borders the following municipalities: Avella, Casamarciano, Cicciano, Comiziano, Roccarainola.

== Demographic evolution ==
Historical population

| Year | Pop. | ±% |
|---|---|---|
| 1861 | 2,218 | — |
| 1871 | 2,115 | −4.6% |
| 1881 | 2,314 | +9.4% |
| 1901 | 2,202 | −4.8% |
| 1911 | 2,076 | −5.7% |

| Year | Pop. | ±% |
|---|---|---|
| 1921 | 2,033 | −2.1% |
| 1931 | 2,149 | +5.7% |
| 1936 | 2,254 | +4.9% |
| 1951 | 2,706 | +20.1% |
| 1961 | 2,927 | +8.2% |

| Year | Pop. | ±% |
|---|---|---|
| 1971 | 2,808 | −4.1% |
| 1981 | 3,038 | +8.2% |
| 1991 | 3,042 | +0.1% |
| 2001 | 3,247 | +6.7% |

Source: Data from ISTAT

== Notable people ==
- Vito Genovese, crime boss and namesake of the Genovese crime family, from the frazione of Risigliano
