= Castello di Cisterna =

- Comune
- Comune di Castello di Cisterna
- Coat of arms

- Location within Italy Location within Campania
- Coordinates: 40°55′N 14°25′E
- Country: Italy
- Region: Campania
- Metropolitan city: Naples (NA)

Government
  - Mayor: Aniello Rega

Area
  - Total: 4.0 km^{2} (1.5 sq mi)
- Elevation: 40 m (130 ft)

Population (30 November 2015)
  - Total: 7,856
  - Density: 2,000/km^{2} (5,100/sq mi)
- Demonym: Cisternesi
- Time zone: UTC+1 (CET)
  - Summer (DST): UTC+2 (CEST)
- Postal code: 80030
- Dialing code: 081
- Website: Official website

Castello di Cisterna (also unofficially Castel Cisterna) is a comune (municipality) in the Metropolitan City of Naples in the Italian region Campania, located about 15 km (9.3 mi) northeast of Naples.

Castello di Cisterna borders the following municipalities: Acerra, Brusciano, Pomigliano d'Arco, Somma Vesuviana.

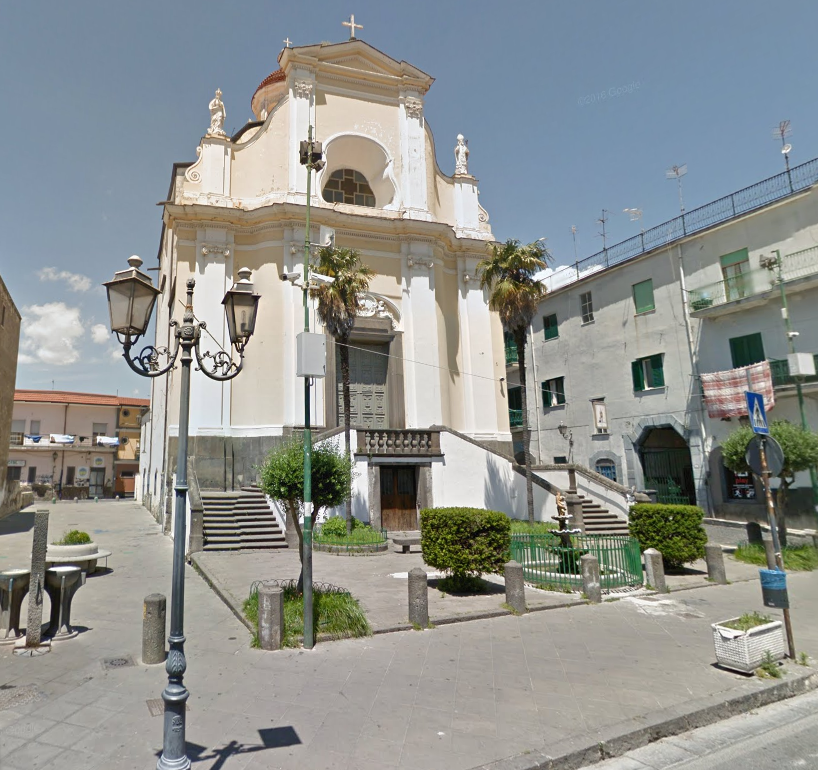
Castle in Castello di Cisterna
