= Melito di Napoli =

Melito di Napoli Melito 'e Napule (Neapolitan)
- Comune
- Comune di Melito di Napoli
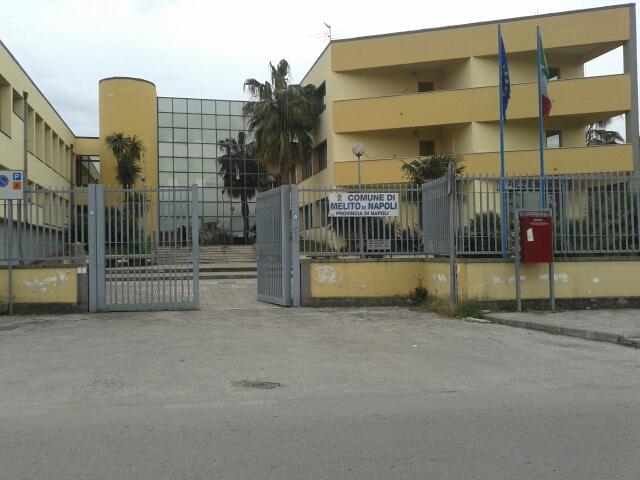
- Town hall

- Location within Italy Location within Campania
- Coordinates: 40°55′N 14°14′E
- Country: Italy
- Region: Campania
- Metropolitan city: Naples (NA)

Government
  - Mayor: Luciano Mottola

Area
  - Total: 3.7 km^{2} (1.4 sq mi)
- Elevation: 89 m (292 ft)

Population (30 June 2019)
  - Total: 37,904
  - Density: 10,000/km^{2} (27,000/sq mi)
- Demonym: Melitesi
- Time zone: UTC+1 (CET)
  - Summer (DST): UTC+2 (CEST)
- Postal code: 80017
- Dialing code: 081
- Website: Official website

Melito di Napoli (Neapolitan: Melito 'e Napule) is a comune (municipality) in the Metropolitan City of Naples in the Italian region of Campania, located about 9 kilometres (5.6 mi) north of Naples.

Melito di Napoli borders the following municipalities: Casandrino, Giugliano in Campania, Mugnano di Napoli, Naples, Sant'Antimo.

== History ==
According to historical documents, the origin of Melito is to be traced back to the emperor Frederick II, who declared Melito Casale di Napoli (Hamlet of Naples). It came to be known as Casale di Napoli up until 1800. Originally it was a small rural village in the north of the city; it was founded without bastions or fortresses, which leads us to infer the village was located in an essentially peaceful territory.

Another Historian derives the name Melito from Mellito which in Latin meant deep trench. At the time of the Duchy of Naples there used to be a border that limited the boundary between Naples and Capua and Melito was one of villages included, among other rural territories.

== Monuments and Landmarks ==
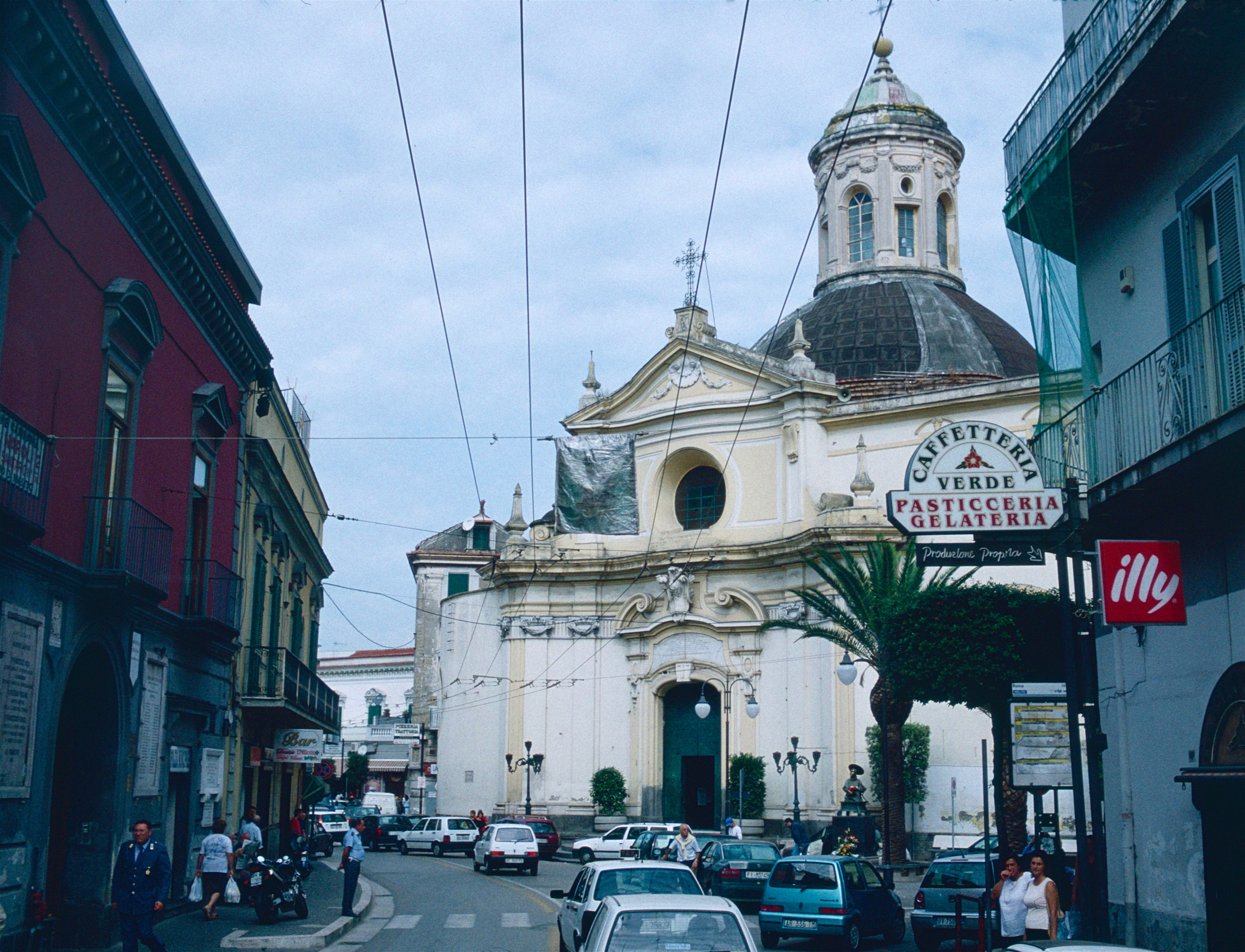
The main church in the central square

Features of interest include the main church Chiesa Santa Maria delle Grazie located in the central square Piazza Santo Stefano, named after the patron saint of Melito. Other landmarks include the Colonne di Giugliano, two columns that represent a geographical point of reference to locals and confining towns, the Chiesa di San Vincenzo Romano, and a commemorative plaque dating back to 1921 in memory of soldiers who died in The Great War.

== Society ==
=== Demographics and Foreign minorities ===
Melito is one of the most densely populated municipalities in Italy and it can enumerate a vast percentage of foreign minorities with residents from Ukraine, Burkina Faso, Bulgaria, India, Pakistan, Romania, Poland and China.

== Culture ==
Melito presents various elementary and lower secondary schools and a secondary school Liceo Immanuel Kant that offers scientific, linguistic and human science educational offers.

The municipal library is located in the central square, Piazza Santo Stefano.

=== Typical foods and dishes ===
Traditional dish in the area is Samurchio, a typical kind of cured meat prepared boiling pig's blood.

Although less cooked and consumed nowadays, Samurchio is a fundamental part of the melitese tradition and it is still possible to find some kiosks serving it according to the original recipe.

==== Melito in media ====
Melito is referenced to in Gomorrah the bestselling book by writer and journalist Roberto Saviano and in the TV series based on the book, Gomorrah- The Series.

===== Events and Folklore =====
The local festival in honour of the patron saint of Melito, Santo Stefano, is held on the second Sunday in October and lasts for the whole week-end until the following Tuesday.

The festival is organised and patronised by local charities and the list of the events include musical concerts, gigs and an auction in which local products and plants are sold to the general public whose bids are donated to less well- off families and homeless people.

== Economy ==
Melito is home to an important coffee company, Kimbo Caffè, a firm active nationwide and expanding abroad.
