= Striano =

- Comune
- Comune di Striano
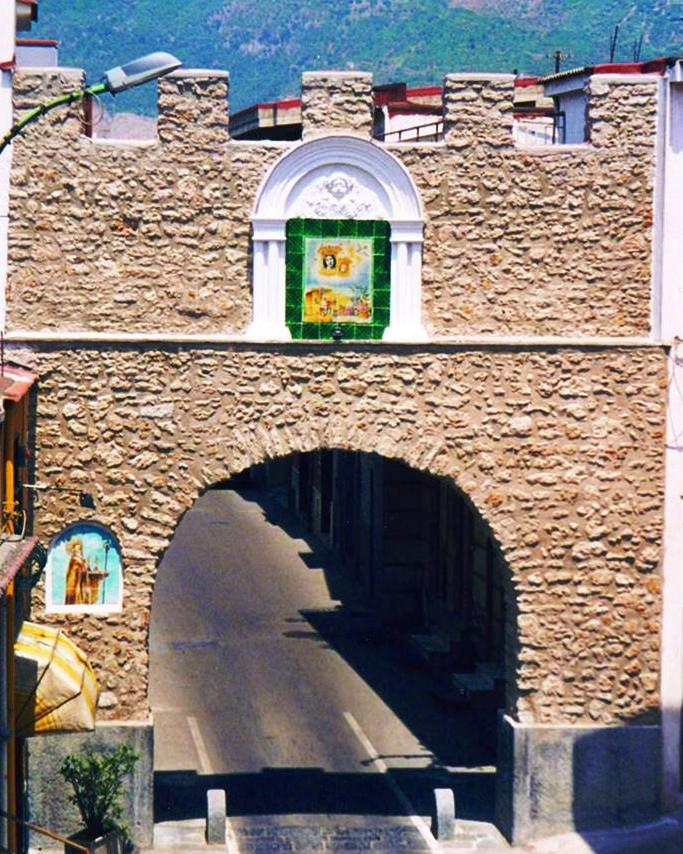
- Civic Gate.

- Coat of arms

- Location within Italy Location within Campania
- Coordinates: 40°49′N 14°34′E
- Country: Italy
- Region: Campania
- Metropolitan city: Naples (NA)

Government
  - Mayor: Aristide Rendina

Area
  - Total: 7.6 km^{2} (2.9 sq mi)
- Elevation: 22 m (72 ft)

Population (30 November 2014)
  - Total: 8,371
  - Density: 1,100/km^{2} (2,900/sq mi)
- Demonym: Strianesi
- Time zone: UTC+1 (CET)
  - Summer (DST): UTC+2 (CEST)
- Postal code: 80040
- Dialing code: 081
- Patron saint: Severinus of Noricum
- Saint day: 8 January
- Website: Official website

Striano is an Italian municipality of 8,764 inhabitants in the Metropolitan City of Naples in Campania, located in the Sarno Valley.

== Physical geography ==
=== Territory ===
The city is located in the Sarno Valley, the south-eastern portion of the Campanian plain, a plain nestled between the Apennine Mountains, Vesuvius, the Lattari Mountains and open towards the Tyrrhenian Sea.

It borders Palma Campania to the north, Sarno (SA) to the east, San Valentino Torio (SA) to the south, Poggiomarino to the west and San Giuseppe Vesuviano to the northwest; the right part of the municipality is bathed by the Sarno river. The municipal territory extends over a surface area of approximately 7.58 km² and its altitude above sea level is between 30 and 16 meters (22 meters in Piazza 4 Novembre). In this area, which is not particularly large, a sustained demand for housing is being triggered. The municipality is part of the Sarno River Hydrographic Basin Regional Park.

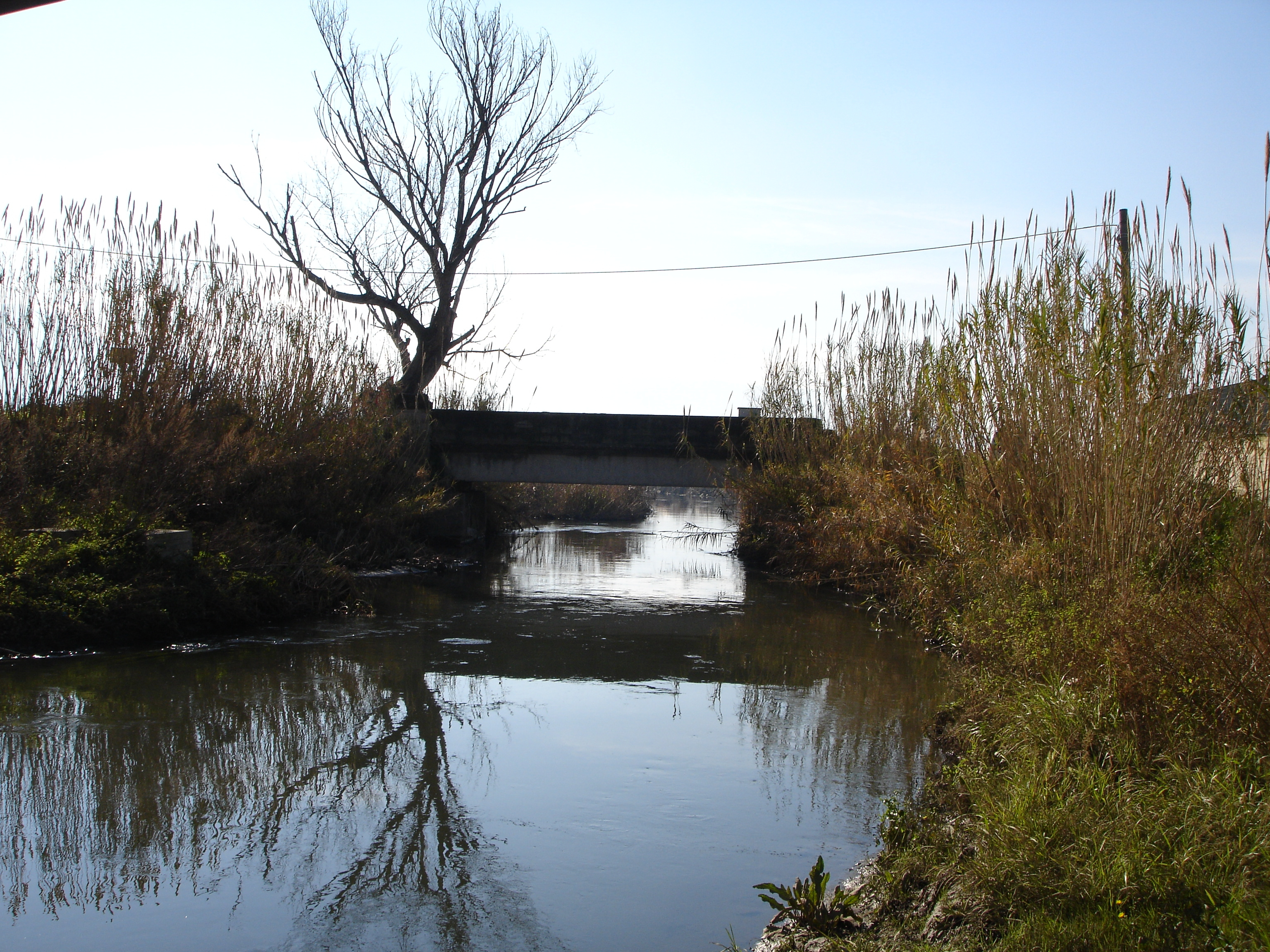
The bridge over the Sarno river on the border with San Valentino Torio

The population growth from 1998 to today is due to the fact that following a flood in nearby Sarno, many people settled in Striano, to get away from the risk areas. Another factor is the immigration of EU and non-EU citizens, as well as the excellent geographical position that guarantees efficient connections with the provincial capitals, Pompeii, the Neapolitan, Amalfi and Sorrento coastal strip.

=== Climate ===
The nearest weather station for which data are available is Naples Capodichino. According to monthly averages calculated over the period 1961–1990, the average temperature of the coldest month (January) is approximately 8.1 °C (46.6 °F), while that of the warmest month (August) is approximately 23.7 °C (74.7 °F). The average annual precipitation is approximately 1,000 mm (39 in).

Climate data for Striano (altitude: 22 metres (72 feet) above sea level.)
Month	Jan	Feb	Mar	Apr	May	Jun	Jul	Aug	Sep	Oct	Nov	Dec	Year
Mean daily maximum °C (°F)	12.5 (54.5)	13.2 (55.8)	15.2 (59.4)	18.2 (64.8)	22.6 (72.7)	26.2 (79.2)	29.3 (84.7)	29.5 (85.1)	26.3 (79.3)	21.8 (71.2)	17.0 (62.6)	13.6 (56.5)	20.5 (68.9)
Mean daily minimum °C (°F)	3.8 (38.8)	4.3 (39.7)	5.9 (42.6)	8.3 (46.9)	12.1 (53.8)	15.6 (60.1)	18.0 (64.4)	17.9 (64.2)	15.3 (59.5)	11.6 (52.9)	7.7 (45.9)	5.1 (41.2)	10.5 (50.9)
Average precipitation mm (inches)	104.4 (4.11)	97.9 (3.85)	85.7 (3.37)	75.5 (2.97)	49.6 (1.95)	34.1 (1.34)	24.3 (0.96)	41.6 (1.64)	80.3 (3.16)	129.7 (5.11)	162.1 (6.38)	121.4 (4.78)	1,006.6 (39.63)
Average relative humidity (%)	75	73	71	70	70	71	70	69	73	74	76	75	72.3
Mean monthly sunshine hours	111	132	153	189	237	279	303	285	234	183	126	102	2,334

- Climate classification of Striano:
  - Climate zone C, 1178 DD.

== Origins of the name ==
There are conflicting opinions on the toponym of the municipality. The toponym Striano is of Roman origin. A fundus Histrianus is cited in the Velleja table and Striano is its apheretic form. In the Middle Ages we find the toponym Histricanum cited in the Bull of erection of the Diocese of Sarno of 1066. Traditionally it was thought that it came from Istra, an erroneous place of origin of Saint Severinus, the patron saint of the municipality. Recently, through studies and research, it has been demonstrated that the toponym derives exactly from the characteristic configuration of the Strianese lands called stigati, and from the way of working them.

== History ==
The first settlements in the Striano area date back to the 9th century BC, as evidenced by the findings of a necropolis of the village that arose between the mid-Bronze Age and the 6th century BC on the banks of the Sarno River.

The land was reclaimed by the Opici, indigenous peoples who increased the cultivation of cereals and grapes in the fertile valley. Conquered by the Etruscans, after a lost battle with the Syracusans, they were forced to cede it to the Samnites, who settled in rustic villas, a type of agricultural estate.

== Sources ==
- Striano: history, traditions and flavours, tour guide
