= Palma Campania =

Palma Campania Parma (Neapolitan)
- Comune
- Comune di Palma Campania
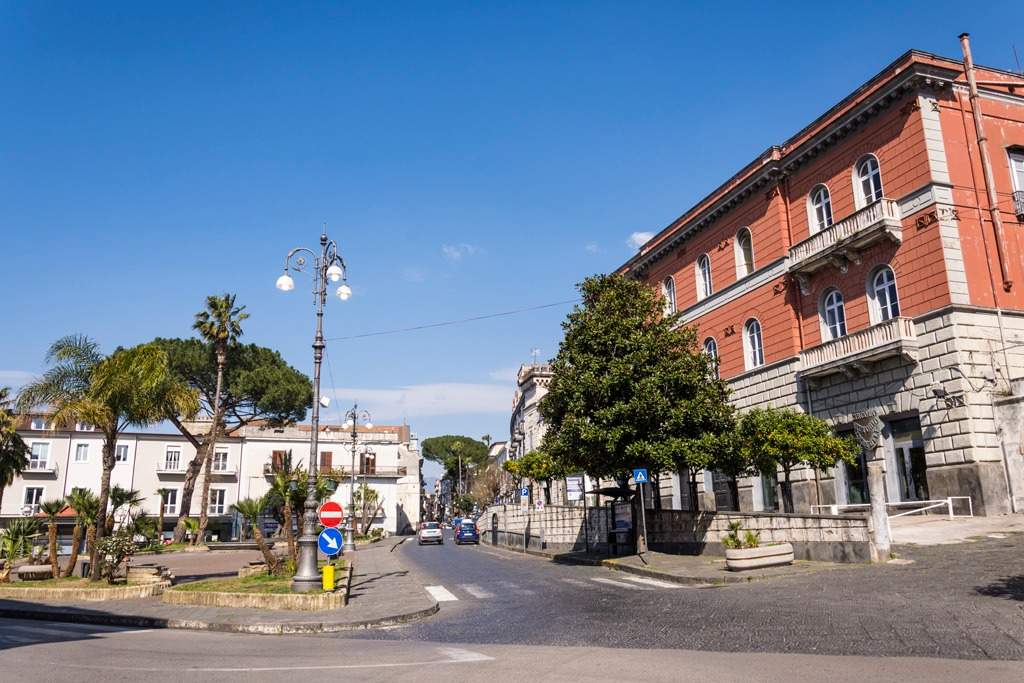
- Piazza de Martino

- Coat of arms

- Location within Italy Location within Campania
- Coordinates: 40°52′N 14°33′E
- Country: Italy
- Region: Campania
- Metropolitan city: Naples (NA)
- Frazioni: Pozzoromolo, Vico di Palma, Castello di Palma, Fiume

Government
  - Mayor: Aniello Donnarumma

Area
  - Total: 20.8 km^{2} (8.0 sq mi)
- Elevation: 85 m (279 ft)

Population (30 June 2019)
  - Total: 16,489
  - Density: 793/km^{2} (2,050/sq mi)
- Demonym: Palmesi
- Time zone: UTC+1 (CET)
  - Summer (DST): UTC+2 (CEST)
- Postal code: 80036
- Dialing code: 081
- Website: Official website

Palma Campania (Neapolitan: Parma), known until 1863 as Palma di Nola, is a comune (municipality) in the Metropolitan City of Naples in the Italian region Campania, located about 25 km (16 mi) east of Naples.

Palma Campania borders the following municipalities: Carbonara di Nola, Domicella, Lauro, Liveri, Nola, Poggiomarino, San Gennaro Vesuviano, San Giuseppe Vesuviano, Sarno, Striano, Ottaviano.

The city is famous also for the Carnevale palmese, i.e. the local Carnival celebration.

== History ==
Archaeological evidence indicates human habitation of the area in the early Bronze Age (c. 1850 BCE), but the foundation of the town is more recent. It has been suggested that Palma was founded in the sixth century CE by people taking refuge from the eruptions of Mount Vesuvius; alternatively it may be linked to a Roman consul named Palma who held office at the beginning of the first century CE.

Remains of the ancient Roman Aqua Augusta aqueduct feeding the bay of Naples are nearby at Ponte Tirone.

The oldest building still standing is the ninth-century church of San Martino, in the frazione Vico. The earliest extant documentary record of the place dates to 997. During the Middle Ages the town's fortunes were linked to the noble families Di Palma, Orsini, Della Tolfa, Pignatelli, Di Bologna, Caracciolo, Salluzzo, and Compagna.
