= Piano di Sorrento =

- Comune
- Comune di Piano di Sorrento
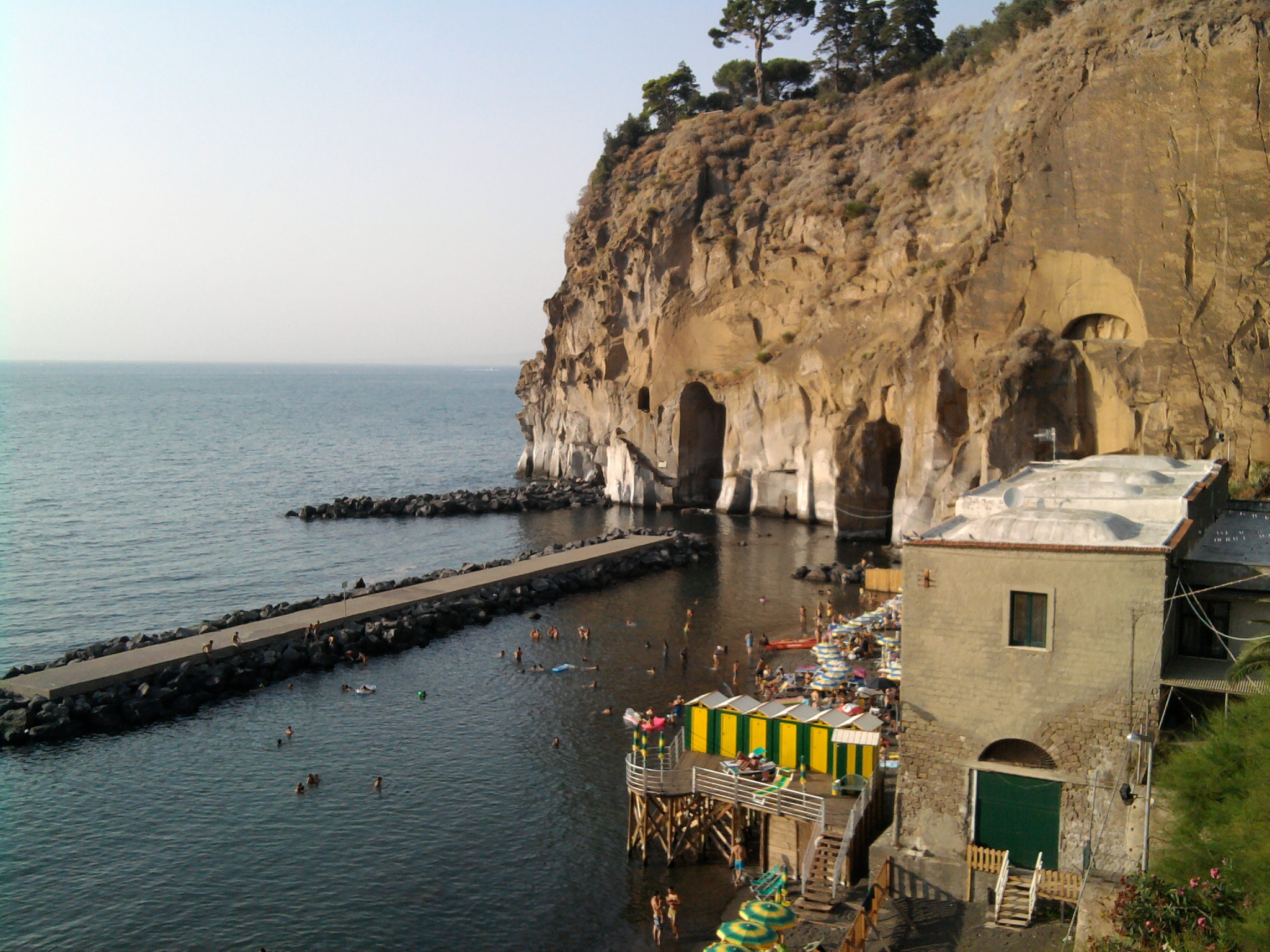
- Beach of Piano di Sorrento

- Coat of arms

- Location within Italy Location within Campania
- Coordinates: 40°38′N 14°25′E
- Country: Italy
- Region: Campania
- Metropolitan city: Naples (NA)
- Frazioni: Cassano, Colli San Pietro, Mortora, Trinità

Government
  - Mayor: Salvatore Cappiello

Area
  - Total: 7.3 km^{2} (2.8 sq mi)
- Elevation: 96 m (315 ft)

Population (31 December 2010)
  - Total: 13,136
  - Density: 1,800/km^{2} (4,700/sq mi)
- Demonym: Carottesi
- Time zone: UTC+1 (CET)
  - Summer (DST): UTC+2 (CEST)
- Postal code: 80063
- Dialing code: 081
- ISTAT code: 063053
- Website: Official website

Piano di Sorrento is a comune (municipality) in the Metropolitan City of Naples in the Italian region Campania, located about 25 km (16 mi) southeast of Naples. Piano di Sorrento borders the following municipalities: Meta, Sant'Agnello, Vico Equense.

Victorian poet Robert Browning sojourned in the area and mentions the countryside of Piano and other localities of the Surrentine peninsula in the poem "The Englishman in Italy".

== Economy ==
In the 19th century, Piano di Sorrento's economy was based mainly on fishing, agriculture and shipbuilding activities. At the beginning of the 20th century, Piano di Sorrento underwent a socio-economic transformation caused by the gradual decline of agriculture and shipbuilding, and the growing importance of trade and tourism. During the 20th century, Piano di Sorrento developed thanks to improvements in electricity and water supplies thanks to the expansion of electricity and water services to homes and the development of the transport link between Sorrento and Castellammare di Stabia, initially served by a tramway and later by a railway (the Circumvesuviana line).

== Twin towns ==
- Schwarzheide, Germany
- Cáceres, Spain

== See also ==
- Sorrentine Peninsula
- Amalfi Coast
