= San Paolo Bel Sito =

San Paolo Bel Sito Santu Paulo (Neapolitan)
- Comune
- Comune di San Paolo Bel Sito
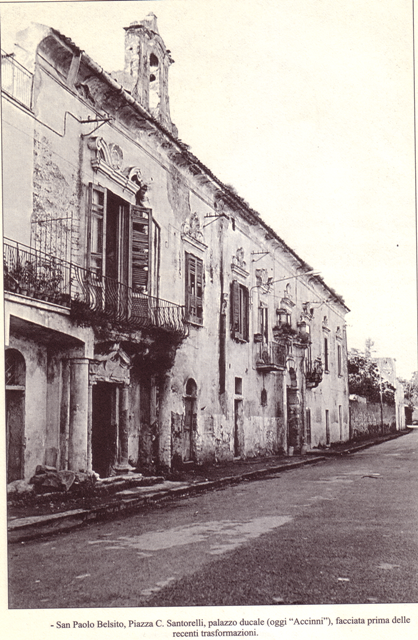

- Location within Italy Location within Campania
- Coordinates: 40°55′N 14°33′E
- Country: Italy
- Region: Campania
- Metropolitan city: Naples (NA)
- Frazioni: Livardi, Scaravito

Government
  - Mayor: Manolo Cafarelli

Area
  - Total: 3.0 km^{2} (1.2 sq mi)
- Elevation: 50 m (160 ft)

Population (31 December 2010)
  - Total: 3,546
  - Density: 1,200/km^{2} (3,100/sq mi)
- Demonym: Sampaolesi or Sanpaolesi
- Time zone: UTC+1 (CET)
  - Summer (DST): UTC+2 (CEST)
- Postal code: 80030
- Dialing code: 081
- Website: Official website

San Paolo Bel Sito (Neapolitan: Santu Paulo) is a comune (municipality) in the Metropolitan City of Naples in the Italian region of Campania. It is located about 25 km (16 mi) northeast of Naples.

San Paolo Bel Sito borders the municipalities of Liveri and Nola.
