= Carbonara di Nola =

Municipality in Campania, Italy

- Comune
- Comune di Carbonara di Nola
- Location within Italy Location within Campania
- Coordinates: 40°53′N 14°35′E
- Country: Italy
- Region: Campania
- Metropolitan city: Naples (NA)
- Frazioni: Battaglia

Government
  - Mayor: Michele Paradiso

Area
  - Total: 3.65 km^{2} (1.41 sq mi)
- Elevation: 158 m (518 ft)

Population (31 May 2017)
  - Total: 2,424
  - Density: 664/km^{2} (1,720/sq mi)
- Demonym: Carbonaresi
- Time zone: UTC+1 (CET)
  - Summer (DST): UTC+2 (CEST)
- Postal code: 80030
- Dialing code: 081
- Website: Official website

Carbonara di Nola is a comune (municipality) in the Metropolitan City of Naples in the Italian region Campania, located about 30 km (19 mi) east of Naples.

Carbonara di Nola borders the following municipalities: Domicella, Lauro, Liveri, Palma Campania.
