= Casoria =

- Comune
- Comune di Casoria
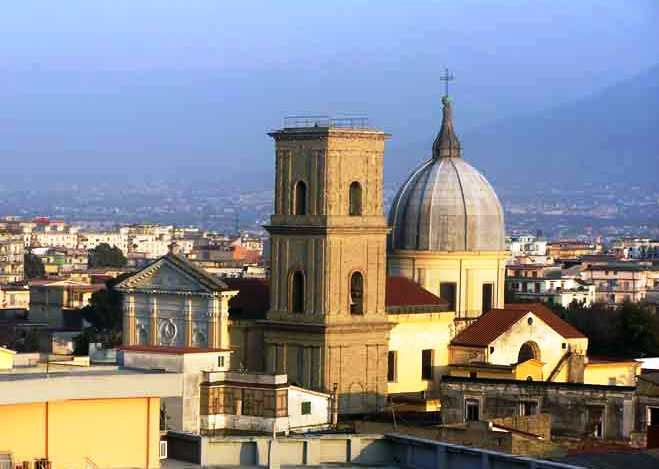
- View of Casoria

- Coat of arms

- Location within Italy Location within Campania
- Coordinates: 40°54′N 14°18′E
- Country: Italy
- Region: Campania
- Metropolitan city: Naples (NA)
- Frazioni: Arpino

Government
  - Mayor: Raffaele Bene

Area
  - Total: 12.13 km^{2} (4.68 sq mi)
- Elevation: 70 m (230 ft)

Population (2026)
  - Total: 73,257
  - Density: 6,039/km^{2} (15,640/sq mi)
- Demonym: Casoriani
- Time zone: UTC+1 (CET)
  - Summer (DST): UTC+2 (CEST)
- Postal code: 80026
- Dialing code: 081
- Website: Official website

Casoria (Italian: [kaˈzɔːrja], Neapolitan: [kaˈsɔːrjə]) is a city and comune (municipality) in the Metropolitan City of Naples in the region of Campania in southern Italy, located about 5 kilometres (3 miles) northeast of Naples. It has 73,257 inhabitants.

Casoria borders the municipalities of Afragola, Arzano, Cardito, Casalnuovo di Napoli, Casavatore, Frattamaggiore, Naples, and Volla.

== History ==
The name of Casoria is mentioned for the first time in documents from 993 to 998, connected to the casa aurea raviosa (Italian: "Casa d'Oro di Raviosa", in English: "Golden House of Raviosa") mentioned in other documents from 952 to 988. However, numerous findings have proven that the territory was inhabited several centuries BCE.

The village of Casoria developed after the year 1000 AD, thanks to the Benedictine monastery of San Gregorio Armeno of Naples. In the 13th century it was a fief of the archbishop of Naples. In 1580 it was acquired by the Royal Estate of the Kingdom of Naples. In 1815 it was made capital of a circondario of the Kingdom of the Two Sicilies, including 19 communes.

Its marshy territory was reclaimed in the same period, becoming one of the most fertile areas in the region. Until the 1950s, Casoria was an agricultural center, also producing pasta and wine, as well as cannabis handicrafts. Its industrial development, during which it became the main industrial hub in southern Italy, caused the population to increase by four times from 1951 to 1991. Most of the industries have disappeared now.

In 2005 the communal council was dissolved due to camorra connections of its members.

== Demographics ==
As of 2026, the population is 73,257, of which 48.2% are male, and 51.8% are female. Minors make up 17.2% of the population, and seniors make up 20.3%.

Historical population

Year	Pop.	±%
1861	7,214	—
1871	7,671	+6.3%
1881	7,943	+3.5%
1901	9,948	+25.2%
1911	10,895	+9.5%
1921	12,626	+15.9%
1931	14,601	+15.6%
1936	16,090	+10.2%

Year	Pop.	±%
1951	19,786	+23.0%
1961	26,277	+32.8%
1971	54,785	+108.5%
1981	68,521	+25.1%
1991	79,707	+16.3%
2001	81,888	+2.7%
2011	78,647	−4.0%
2021	74,394	−5.4%

Source: ISTAT

=== Immigration ===
As of 2025, immigrants make up 2.7% of the population. The 5 largest foreign countries of birth are Ukraine, Germany, Indonesia, Romania, and Sri Lanka.
