= Liveri =

- Comune
- Comune di Liveri
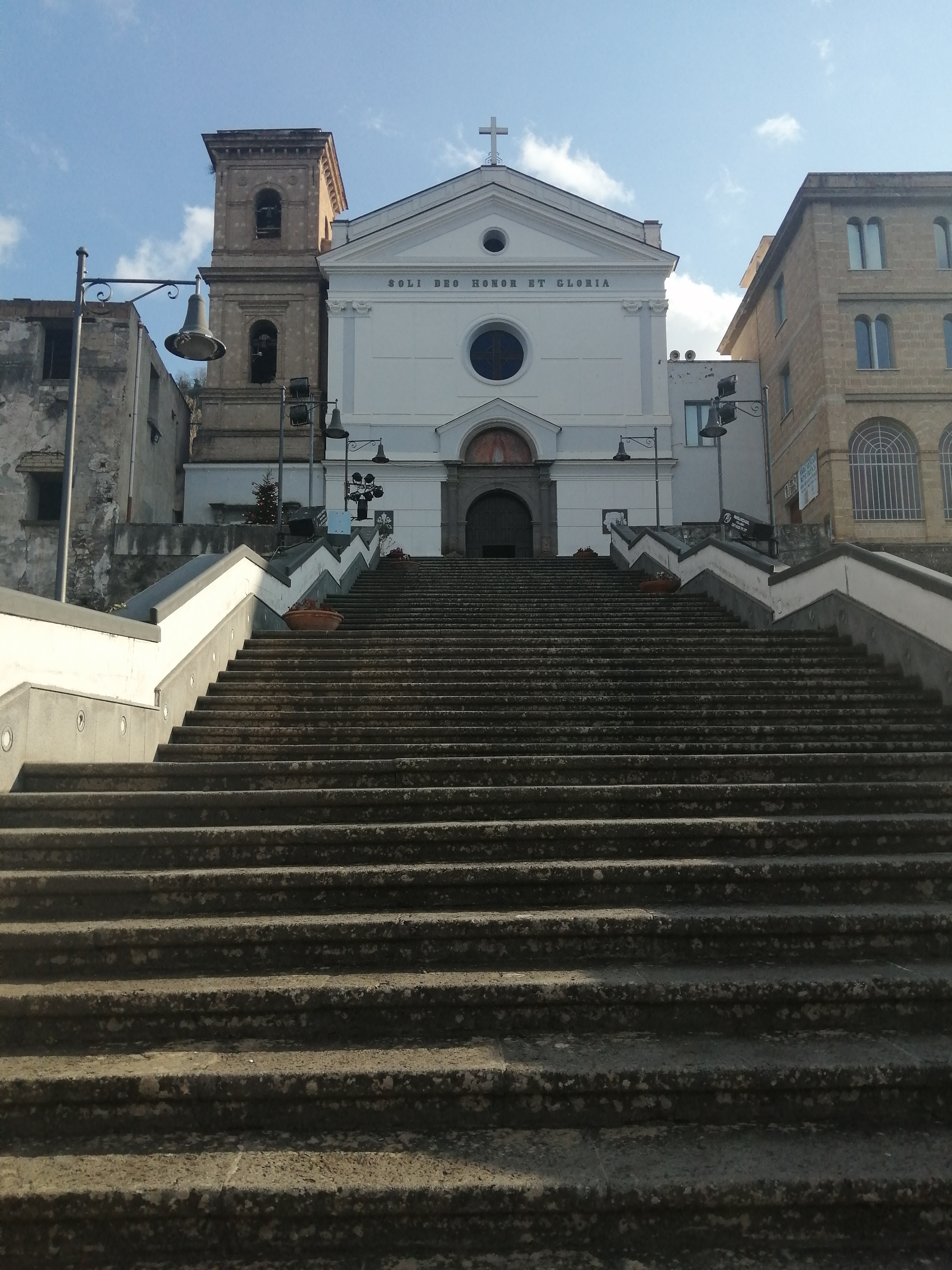

- Location within Italy Location within Campania
- Coordinates: 40°54′N 14°34′E
- Country: Italy
- Region: Campania
- Metropolitan city: Naples (NA)

Government
  - Mayor: Raffaele Coppola

Area
  - Total: 2.6 km^{2} (1.0 sq mi)
- Elevation: 90 m (300 ft)

Population (1 January 2014)
  - Total: 1,630
  - Density: 630/km^{2} (1,600/sq mi)
- Demonym: Liveresi
- Time zone: UTC+1 (CET)
  - Summer (DST): UTC+2 (CEST)
- Postal code: 80030
- Dialing code: 081
- Patron saint: St. George
- Saint day: 23 April
- Website: Official website

Liveri is a comune (municipality) in the Metropolitan City of Naples in the Italian region Campania, located about 30 km (19 mi) northeast of Naples.

Liveri borders the following municipalities: Carbonara di Nola, Domicella, Marzano di Nola, Nola, Palma Campania, San Paolo Bel Sito, Visciano.
