= Casamarciano =

- Comune
- Comune di Casamarciano
- Coat of arms

- Location within Italy Location within Campania
- Coordinates: 40°56′N 14°33′E
- Country: Italy
- Region: Campania
- Metropolitan city: Naples (NA)

Government
  - Mayor: Andrea Manzi

Area
  - Total: 6.3 km^{2} (2.4 sq mi)
- Elevation: 70 m (230 ft)

Population (31-07- 2022)
  - Total: 3,043
  - Density: 480/km^{2} (1,300/sq mi)
- Demonym: Casamarcianesi
- Time zone: UTC+1 (CET)
  - Summer (DST): UTC+2 (CEST)
- Postal code: 80032
- Dialing code: 081
- Website: Official website

Casamarciano is a comune (municipality) in the Metropolitan City of Naples in the Italian region Campania, located about 30 kilometres (19 mi) northeast of Naples.

Casamarciano borders the following municipalities: Avella, Cimitile, Comiziano, Nola, Tufino, Visciano.
