= Comiziano =

- Comune
- Comune di Comiziano
- Coat of arms

- Location within Italy Location within Campania
- Coordinates: 40°57′N 14°33′E
- Country: Italy
- Region: Campania
- Metropolitan city: Naples (NA)
- Frazioni: Gallo

Government
  - Mayor: Paolino Napolitano

Area
  - Total: 2.4 km^{2} (0.93 sq mi)
- Elevation: 73 m (240 ft)

Population (1 March 2010)
  - Total: 1,829
  - Density: 760/km^{2} (2,000/sq mi)
- Demonym: Comizianesi
- Time zone: UTC+1 (CET)
  - Summer (DST): UTC+2 (CEST)
- Postal code: 80030
- Dialing code: 081
- Website: Official website

Comiziano is a comune (municipality) in the Metropolitan City of Naples in Italy, Campania region, located about 30 km (19 mi) northeast of Naples.

Comiziano borders the following municipalities: Camposano, Casamarciano, Cicciano, Cimitile, Tufino.
