= Casavatore =

- Comune
- Comune di Casavatore
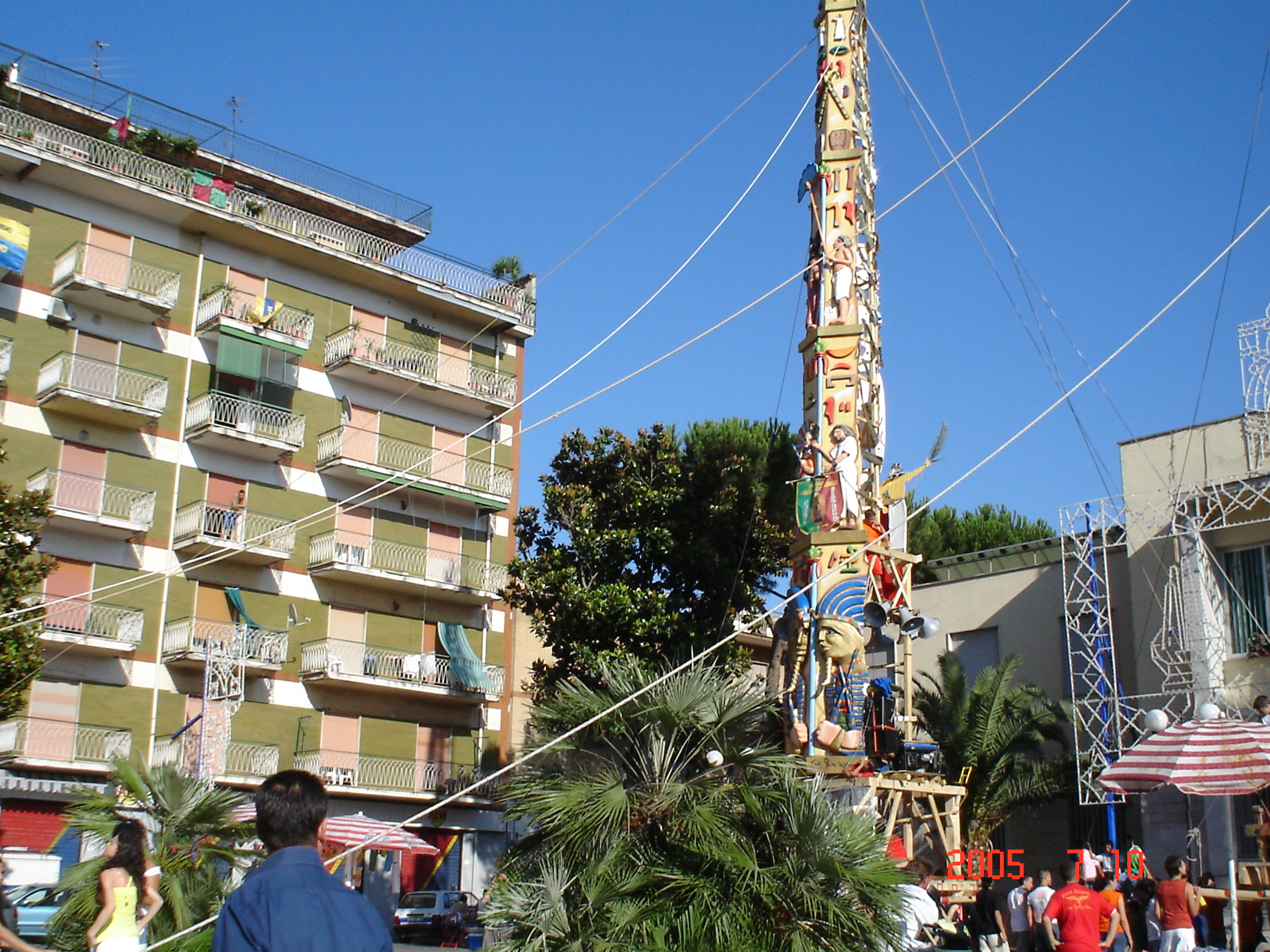

- Coat of arms

- Location within Italy Location within Campania
- Coordinates: 40°54′N 14°16′E
- Country: Italy
- Region: Campania
- Metropolitan city: Naples (NA)

Government
  - Mayor: Fabrizio Celaj (Partito Democratico)

Area
  - Total: 1.53 km^{2} (0.59 sq mi)
- Elevation: 80 m (260 ft)

Population (2026)
  - Total: 18,244
  - Density: 11,900/km^{2} (30,900/sq mi)
- Demonym: Casavatoresi
- Time zone: UTC+1 (CET)
  - Summer (DST): UTC+2 (CEST)
- Postal code: 80020
- Dialing code: 081
- Patron saint: St. John the Baptist
- Saint day: 24 June

Casavatore is a comune (municipality) in the Metropolitan City of Naples in the Italian region of Campania, located about 8 kilometres (5.0 mi) north of Naples. It is the first Italian comune by population density and land consumed, with 90.9% of urbanized land. It has 18,244 inhabitants.

Casavatore borders the municipalities of Arzano, Casoria and Naples.

== Demographics ==
As of 2026, the population is 18,244, of which 48.5% are male, and 51.5% are female. Minors make up 17.6% of the population, and seniors make up 20.1%.

Historical population

| Year | Pop. | ±% |
|---|---|---|
| 1861 | 1,657 | — |
| 1871 | 1,762 | +6.3% |
| 1881 | 1,824 | +3.5% |
| 1901 | 2,777 | +52.2% |
| 1911 | 3,325 | +19.7% |
| 1921 | 3,359 | +1.0% |
| 1931 | 3,756 | +11.8% |
| 1936 | 4,151 | +10.5% |

| Year | Pop. | ±% |
|---|---|---|
| 1951 | 5,007 | +20.6% |
| 1961 | 5,803 | +15.9% |
| 1971 | 13,292 | +129.1% |
| 1981 | 20,182 | +51.8% |
| 1991 | 20,869 | +3.4% |
| 2001 | 20,087 | −3.7% |
| 2011 | 18,663 | −7.1% |
| 2021 | 18,282 | −2.0% |

Source: ISTAT

=== Immigration ===
As of 2025, of the known countries of birth of 18,101 residents, the most numerous are: Italy (17,918 – 99%), Most of immigrants are from China and Ukraine.
