= Metropolitan City of Naples =

City in Campania, Italy

Metropolitan City of Naples Città metropolitana di Napoli (Italian)
- Metropolitan city
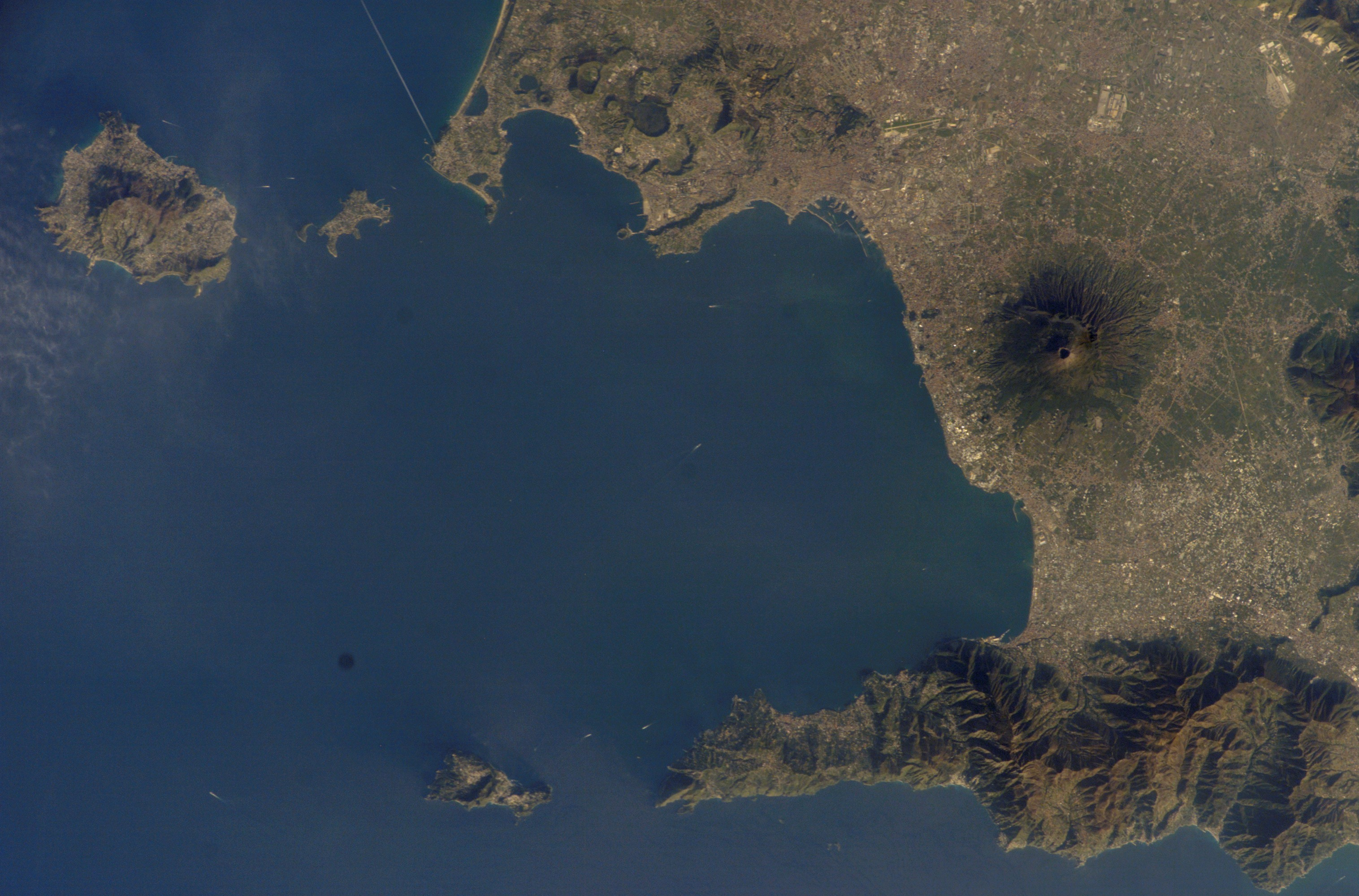
- Aerial view of the Metropolitan City of Naples

- Flag Coat of arms

- Location of the Metropolitan City of Naples in Italy
- Coordinates: 40.8333°N 14.2500°E
- Country: Italy
- Region: Campania
- Established: 1 January 2015
- Capital(s): Naples
- Municipalities: 92

Government
  - Metropolitan mayor: Gaetano Manfredi

Area
  - Total: 1,178.93 km^{2} (455.19 sq mi)

Population (2026)
  - Total: 2,954,847
  - Density: 2,506.38/km^{2} (6,491.50/sq mi)

GDP
  - Metro: €97.860 billion (2021)
  - Per capita: €33,101 (2021)
- Time zone: UTC+1 (CET)
  - Summer (DST): UTC+2 (CEST)
- Postal code: 80121–80147 (cap); 80010–80079 (rest)
- Telephone prefix: 081
- Vehicle registration: NA
- ISTAT: 263
- Website: www.cittametropolitana.na.it

The Metropolitan City of Naples (Italian: città metropolitana di Napoli) is a metropolitan city in the region of Campania in southern Italy. Its capital is the city of Naples. The province was established on 1 January 2015 and contains 92 comuni (sing.: comune). It was first created by the reform of local authorities (Law 142/1990) and established by Law 56/2014, thus replacing the province of Naples in 2015. With a population of 2,954,847 as of 2026, making it the 3rd most populous metropolitan city in the country.

The Metropolitan City of Naples is headed by the Metropolitan Mayor (sindaco metropolitano) and the Metropolitan Council (consiglio metropolitano). Since 18 October 2021, its head has been Gaetano Manfredi, mayor of the capital city.

== Geography ==
Location of the Metropolitan City in Campania region

The city is the 96th out of 110 Italian provinces and metropolitan cities by landmass, with an area (1,178.93 square kilometres (455.19 sq mi) including islands) that is smaller than the municipality of Rome (1,287.36 square kilometres (497.05 sq mi)). Naples is, however, Italy's third largest metropolitan city by population, making it one of the most densely populated areas in Europe; the metropolitan region also includes the municipality of Casavatore, the highest-density municipality in Italy (at 12,000 inhabitants/km^{2}). While it contains more than half of Campania's population, it only occupies 8.6% of Campania's landmass (13,590 km^{2}), creating a strong demographic and territorial imbalance with the other four provinces in Campania.

Municipalities (comune) in the Metropolitan City vary in size, ranging from 1.62 km^{2} (0.63 sq mi) (Casavatore) to 117.27 km^{2} (45.28 sq mi) (Naples); 60% of the municipalities are small (less than or equal to 10 km^{2} (3.9 sq mi)), 36% of medium-sized (> 10 km^{2} and ≤ 25 km^{2}), the rest (11%) more than 25 km^{2} (9.7 sq mi) and, of this, only two municipalities (Acerra and Giugliano) are between 50 and 100 km^{2} (39 sq mi) and only the municipality of Naples exceeds 100 km^{2} (39 sq mi).

Because of its proximity to Vesuvius and Phlegraean Fields, the city is vulnerable to seismic and volcanic activity.

== Government ==
=== Metropolitan Council ===
Metropolitan Cities give large urban areas the administrative powers of a province, a system designed to improve local administration, create efficiency in spending, and better coordinate basic services (including transport, school and social programs) and environment protection. The Mayor of Naples thus also has powers as Metropolitan Mayor, presiding over a Metropolitan Council formed by 24 mayors of municipalities (comune) within the Metropolitan City.

The first Metropolitan Council of the City was elected on 28 September 2014.The current Metropolitan Council of the City was elected on 13 March 2022:

| Group | Seats |
|---|---|
| PD • SI • EV | 14 / 24 |
| M5S | 3 / 24 |
| FI | 3 / 24 |
| FdI | 1 / 24 |
| L | 1 / 24 |
| A | 1 / 24 |
| Others | 1 / 24 |

=== List of metropolitan mayors ===
| | Metropolitan Mayor | Term start | Term end | Party |
|---|---|---|---|---|
| 1 | Luigi de Magistris | 1 January 2015 | 18 October 2021 | DemA |
| 2 | Gaetano Manfredi | 18 October 2021 | Incumbent | Ind |

=== Municipalities ===
The metropolitan city has 92 municipalities:

- Acerra
- Afragola
- Agerola
- Anacapri
- Arzano
- Bacoli
- Barano d'Ischia
- Boscoreale
- Boscotrecase
- Brusciano
- Caivano
- Calvizzano
- Camposano
- Capri
- Carbonara di Nola
- Cardito
- Casalnuovo di Napoli
- Casamarciano
- Casamicciola Terme
- Casandrino
- Casavatore
- Casola di Napoli
- Casoria
- Castellammare di Stabia
- Castello di Cisterna
- Cercola
- Cicciano
- Cimitile
- Comiziano
- Crispano
- Ercolano
- Forio
- Frattamaggiore
- Frattaminore
- Giugliano in Campania
- Gragnano
- Grumo Nevano
- Ischia
- Lacco Ameno
- Lettere
- Liveri
- Marano di Napoli
- Mariglianella
- Marigliano
- Massa di Somma
- Massa Lubrense
- Melito di Napoli
- Meta
- Monte di Procida
- Mugnano di Napoli
- Naples
- Nola
- Ottaviano
- Palma Campania
- Piano di Sorrento
- Pimonte
- Poggiomarino
- Pollena Trocchia
- Pomigliano d'Arco
- Pompei
- Portici
- Pozzuoli
- Procida
- Qualiano
- Quarto
- Roccarainola
- San Gennaro Vesuviano
- San Giorgio a Cremano
- San Giuseppe Vesuviano
- San Paolo Bel Sito
- San Sebastiano al Vesuvio
- San Vitaliano
- Sant'Agnello
- Sant'Anastasia
- Sant'Antimo
- Sant'Antonio Abate
- Santa Maria la Carità
- Saviano
- Scisciano
- Serrara Fontana
- Somma Vesuviana
- Sorrento
- Striano
- Terzigno
- Torre Annunziata
- Torre del Greco
- Trecase
- Tufino
- Vico Equense
- Villaricca
- Visciano
- Volla

== Demographics ==
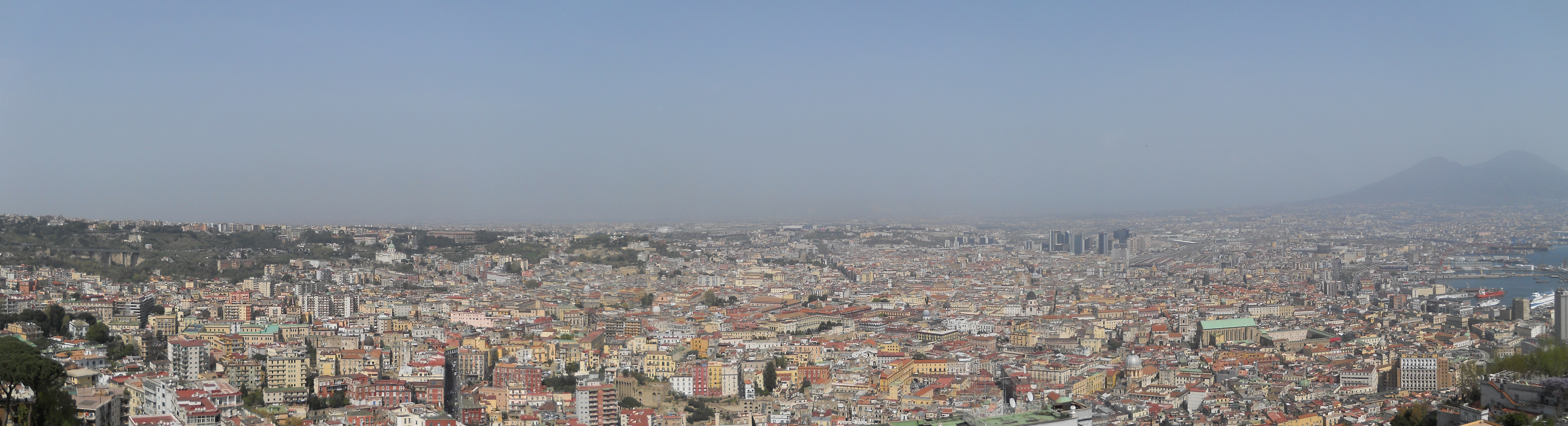
Naples urban area

Historical population
| Year | Pop. | ±% |
|---|---|---|
| 1861 | 951,026 | — |
| 1871 | 997,179 | +4.9% |
| 1881 | 1,086,149 | +8.9% |
| 1901 | 1,244,577 | +14.6% |
| 1911 | 1,414,568 | +13.7% |
| 1921 | 1,587,834 | +12.2% |
| 1931 | 1,648,430 | +3.8% |
| 1936 | 1,734,848 | +5.2% |
| 1951 | 2,081,119 | +20.0% |
| 1961 | 2,421,243 | +16.3% |
| 1971 | 2,709,929 | +11.9% |
| 1981 | 2,970,563 | +9.6% |
| 1991 | 3,016,026 | +1.5% |
| 2001 | 3,059,196 | +1.4% |
| 2011 | 3,054,956 | −0.1% |
| 2021 | 2,988,376 | −2.2% |
Source: ISTAT

As of 2026, the population is 2,954,847, of which 48.7% are male, and 51.3% are female. Minors make up 16.9% of the population, and seniors make up 21%.

=== Immigration ===
As of 2025, of the known countries of birth of 2,916,975 residents, the most numerous are: Italy (2,812,459 – 96.4%).

== Economy ==
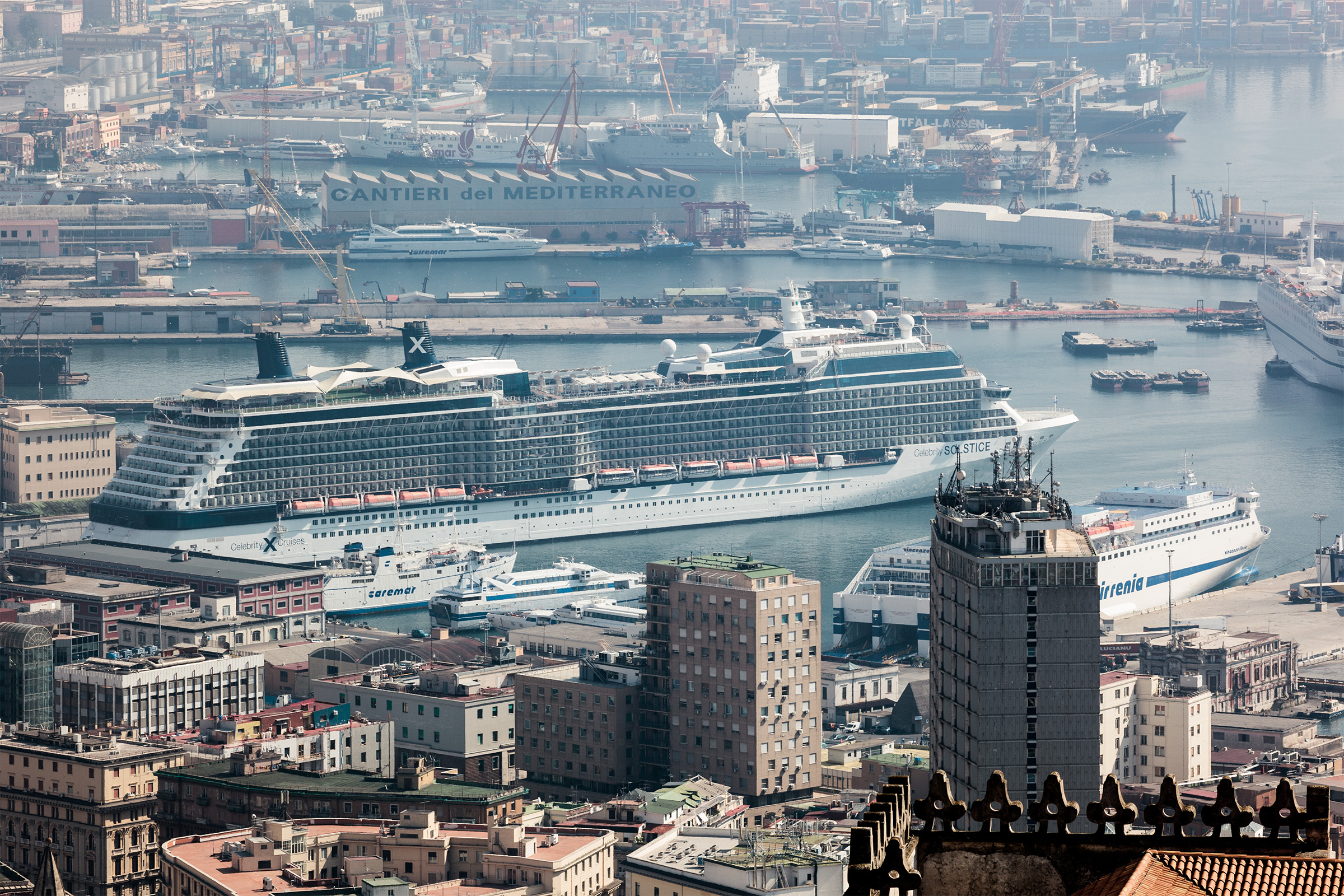
The port of Naples

Naples, within its administrative limits, is Italy's fourth-largest economy after Milan, Rome and Turin, and is the world's 103rd-largest urban economy by purchasing power, with an estimated 2024 GDP of €28.4 billion, equivalent to €30.804 per capita. Naples is a major cargo terminal, and the port of Naples is one of the Mediterranean's largest and busiest. The city has experienced significant economic growth since World War II, but joblessness remains a major problem,

Naples is, with Florence, Rome, Venice and Milan, one of the main Italian tourist destinations. With 20,000,000 visitors in 2025, the city has completely emerged from the strong tourist depression of past decades (due primarily to the unilateral destination of an industrial city but also due to the damage to the city's image caused by the Italian media, from the 1980 Irpinia earthquake and the waste crisis, in favour of the coastal centres of its metropolitan area).

== Tourism ==
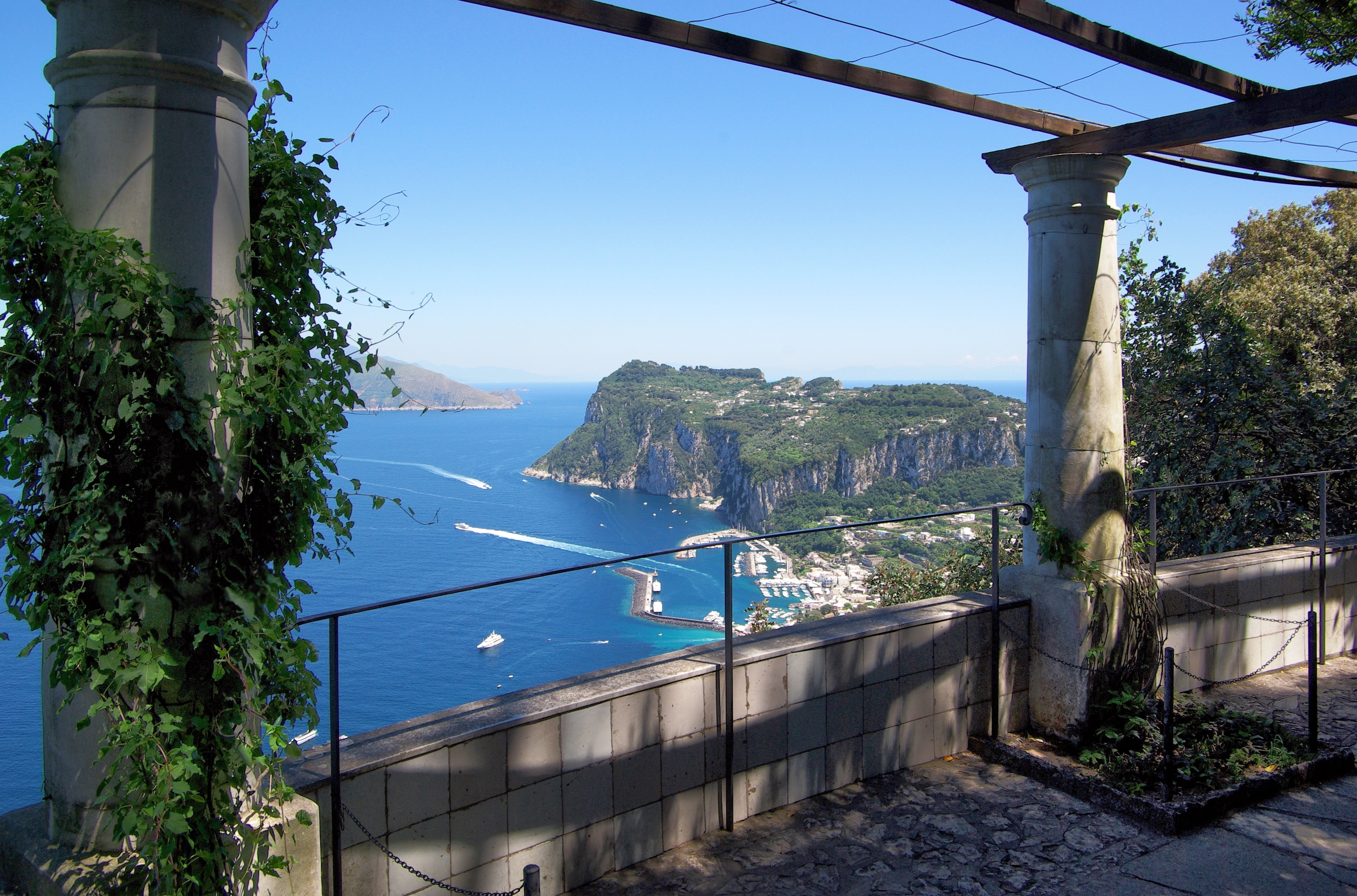
Capri

The area is particularly fruitful for tourism, both national and international. Pompeii, the excavated Roman city which was destroyed by Mount Vesuvius in 79 AD is among the most popular destinations in all of Italy. Three islands in the Gulf of Naples are also prominent destinations; Ischia, Procida, part of the Phlegrean Islands, and Capri. Together they are also known as the Campanian Archipelago. On Capri, there is the famous Blue Grotto; inside the grotto the sea seems to be lit from underwater, it is a magnificent blue colour, hence its name.

The Sorrentine Peninsula (and its main town Sorrento) has long been a popular destination for tourism, it is well known for the drink Limoncello and its luxurious sea cliffs. It is rich with villas, castles, guard towers, churches, and in Vico Equense ancient farmhouses.

== Sport ==
The most popular sport in the metropolitan city is football. This area was one of the first in Southern Italy to start playing sports, when English sailors brought them in during the early 1900s. The most successful club from the province are by far SSC Napoli, who have won Serie A (the Italian Championship) four times and the UEFA Cup while Diego Maradona was with the club.

At present there are four professional football clubs playing within the Italian leagues from the province; in Serie A there is SSC Napoli, while in Lega Pro the province is represented by SS Ischia Isolaverde, SS Juve Stabia and AC Savoia.

== See also ==
- Province of Naples
