= Sant'Antonio Abate =

Sant'Antonio Abate Sant'Antuono (Neapolitan)
- Comune
- Comune di Sant'Antonio Abate
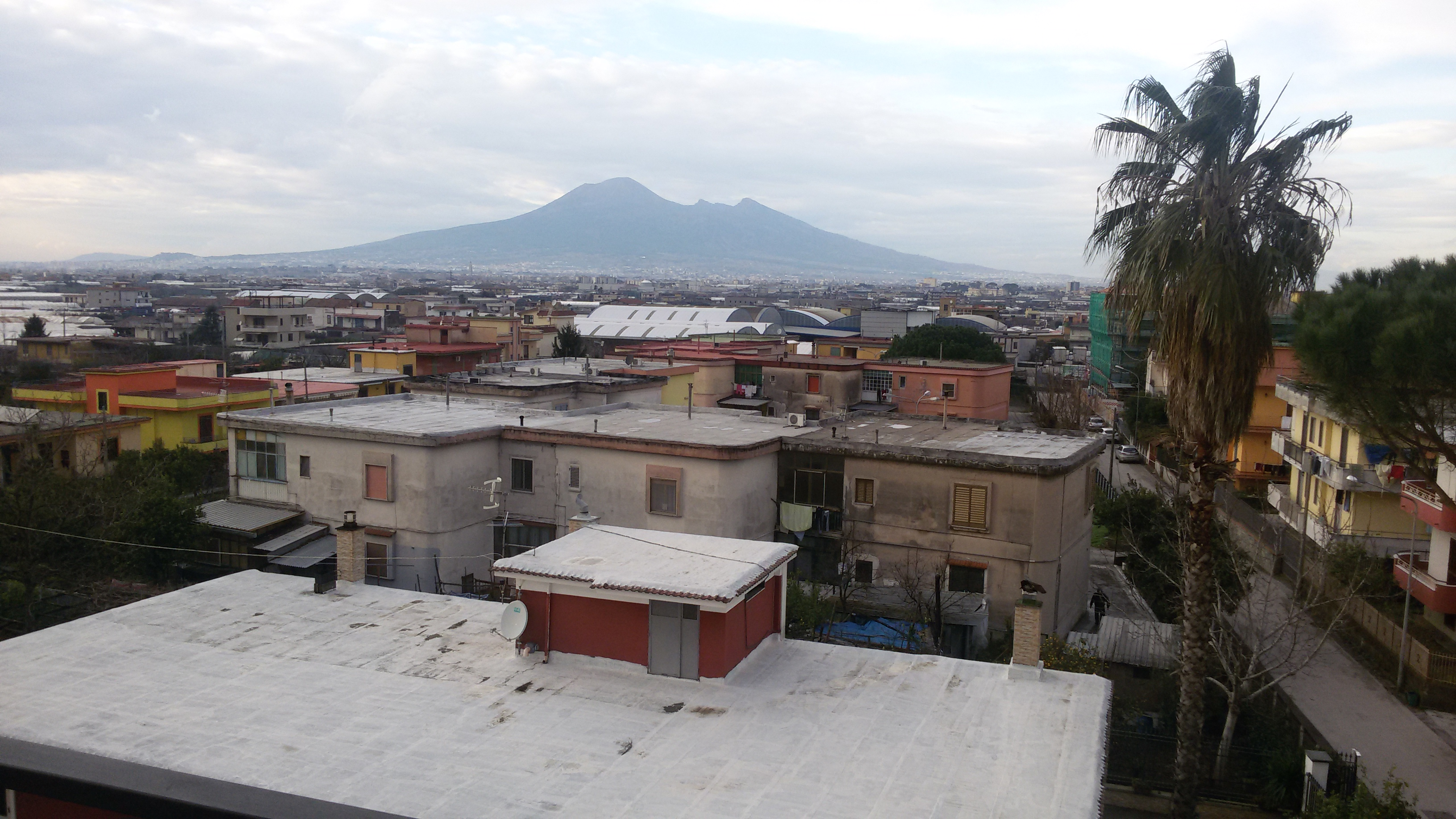

- Coat of arms

- Location within Italy Location within Campania
- Coordinates: 40°44′N 14°33′E
- Country: Italy
- Region: Campania
- Metropolitan city: Naples (NA)
- Frazioni: Casa Iovine, Salette, Fusara, Cottimo, Buonconsiglio, Pontone

Government
  - Mayor: Ilaria Abagnale

Area
  - Total: 7.9 km^{2} (3.1 sq mi)
- Elevation: 20 m (66 ft)

Population (31 August 2016)
  - Total: 19,746
  - Density: 2,500/km^{2} (6,500/sq mi)
- Demonym: Abatesi
- Time zone: UTC+1 (CET)
  - Summer (DST): UTC+2 (CEST)
- Postal code: 80057
- Dialing code: 081
- Patron saint: St Anthony the Abbot
- Saint day: 17 January
- Website: Official website

Sant'Antonio Abate (Neapolitan: Sant'Antuono) is a comune (municipality) in the Metropolitan City of Naples in the Italian region Campania, located about 30 km (19 mi) southeast of Naples.

Sant'Antonio Abate borders the following municipalities: Angri, Gragnano, Lettere, Pompei, Santa Maria la Carità, Scafati.
