= Casola di Napoli =

- Comune
- Comune di Casola di Napoli
- Location within Italy Location within Campania
- Coordinates: 40°42′N 14°32′E
- Country: Italy
- Region: Campania
- Metropolitan city: Naples (NA)

Government
  - Mayor: Alfredo Rosalba

Area
  - Total: 2.59 km^{2} (1.00 sq mi)
- Elevation: 170 m (560 ft)

Population (31 December 2017)
  - Total: 3,864
  - Density: 1,490/km^{2} (3,860/sq mi)
- Demonym: Casolesi
- Time zone: UTC+1 (CET)
  - Summer (DST): UTC+2 (CEST)
- Postal code: 80050
- Dialing code: 081
- Website: Official website

Casola di Napoli is a comune (municipality) in the Metropolitan City of Naples in the Italian region Campania, located about 30 kilometres (19 mi) southeast of Naples.

Casola di Napoli borders the municipalities of Gragnano and Lettere.

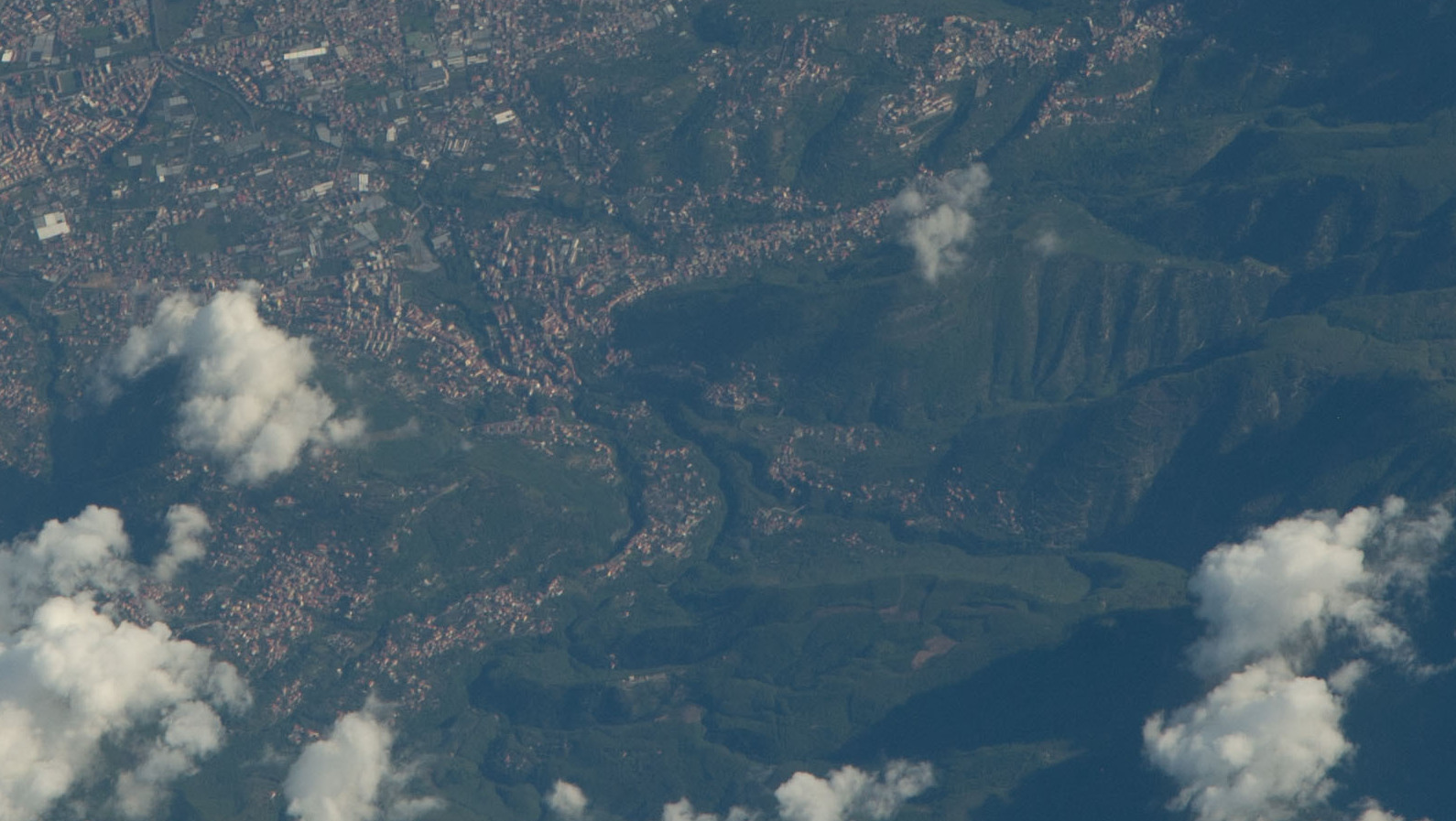
forested landscape from above, Monte Muto and Casola di Napoli, Pimonte and Gragnano
