= Cardito =

- Comune
- Comune di Cardito
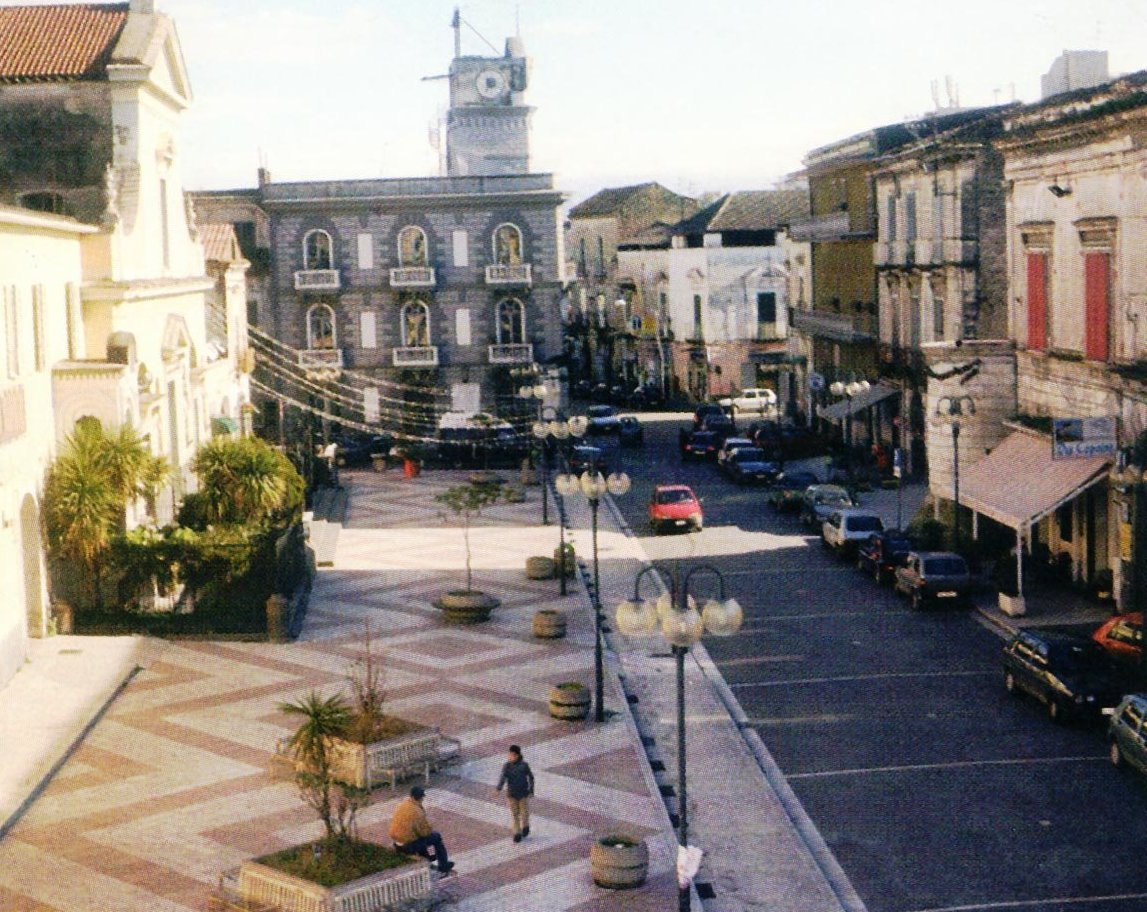

- Coat of arms

- Location within Italy Location within Campania
- Coordinates: 40°57′N 14°18′E
- Country: Italy
- Region: Campania
- Metropolitan city: Naples (NA)
- Frazioni: Carditello

Government
  - Mayor: Giuseppe Cirillo

Area
  - Total: 3.2 km^{2} (1.2 sq mi)
- Elevation: 33 m (108 ft)

Population (30 September 2015)
  - Total: 22,767
  - Density: 7,100/km^{2} (18,000/sq mi)
- Demonym(s): Carditesi, Carditellesi
- Time zone: UTC+1 (CET)
  - Summer (DST): UTC+2 (CEST)
- Postal code: 80024
- Dialing code: 081
- Patron saint: St. Blaise (commune), St. Joseph and St. Euphemia (Carditello)
- Saint day: 3 February (commune), 13 June (Carditello)
- Website: Official website

Cardito is a comune (municipality) in the Metropolitan City of Naples in the Italian region Campania, located about 14 kilometres (8.7 mi) northeast of Naples.

Cardito borders the following municipalities: Afragola, Caivano, Casoria, Crispano, Frattamaggiore. It was once mainly known for its strawberry and asparagus production; now also buffalo mozzarella is produced.

The city was perhaps founded by people from the nearby Atella around 350-300 BC. It is connected by the SS 87 Sannitica national road.
