= San Giuseppe Vesuviano =

- Comune
- Comune di San Giuseppe Vesuviano
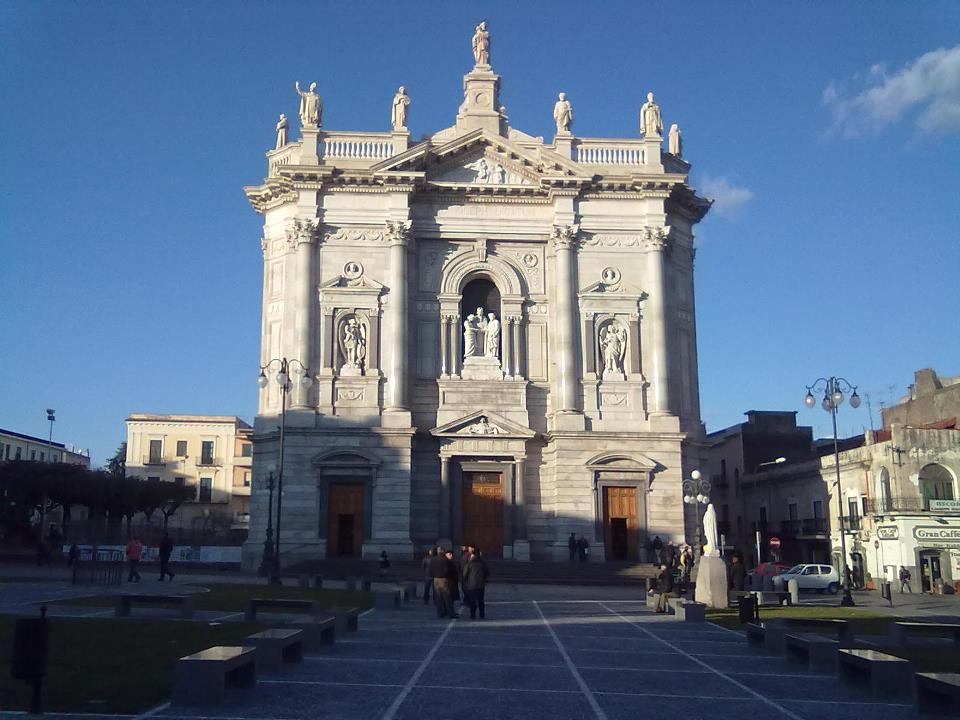

- Location within Italy Location within Campania
- Coordinates: 40°50′N 14°30′E
- Country: Italy
- Region: Campania
- Metropolitan city: Naples (NA)

Government
  - Mayor: Vincenzo Catapano

Area
  - Total: 14.1 km^{2} (5.4 sq mi)
- Elevation: 101 m (331 ft)

Population (1 January 2017)
  - Total: 31,192
  - Density: 2,210/km^{2} (5,730/sq mi)
- Demonym: Sangiuseppesi
- Time zone: UTC+1 (CET)
  - Summer (DST): UTC+2 (CEST)
- Postal code: 80047
- Dialing code: 081
- Website: Official website

San Giuseppe Vesuviano is a comune (municipality) in the Metropolitan City of Naples in Italy, region Campania, located about 20 km (12 mi) east of Naples.

Sights include the sanctuary dedicated to St. Joseph that stands in the center of the city.

San Giuseppe Vesuviano borders the following municipalities: Ottaviano, Palma Campania, Poggiomarino, San Gennaro Vesuviano, Terzigno.
