= Meta, Campania =

Meta Meta di Sorrento
- Comune
- Comune di Meta
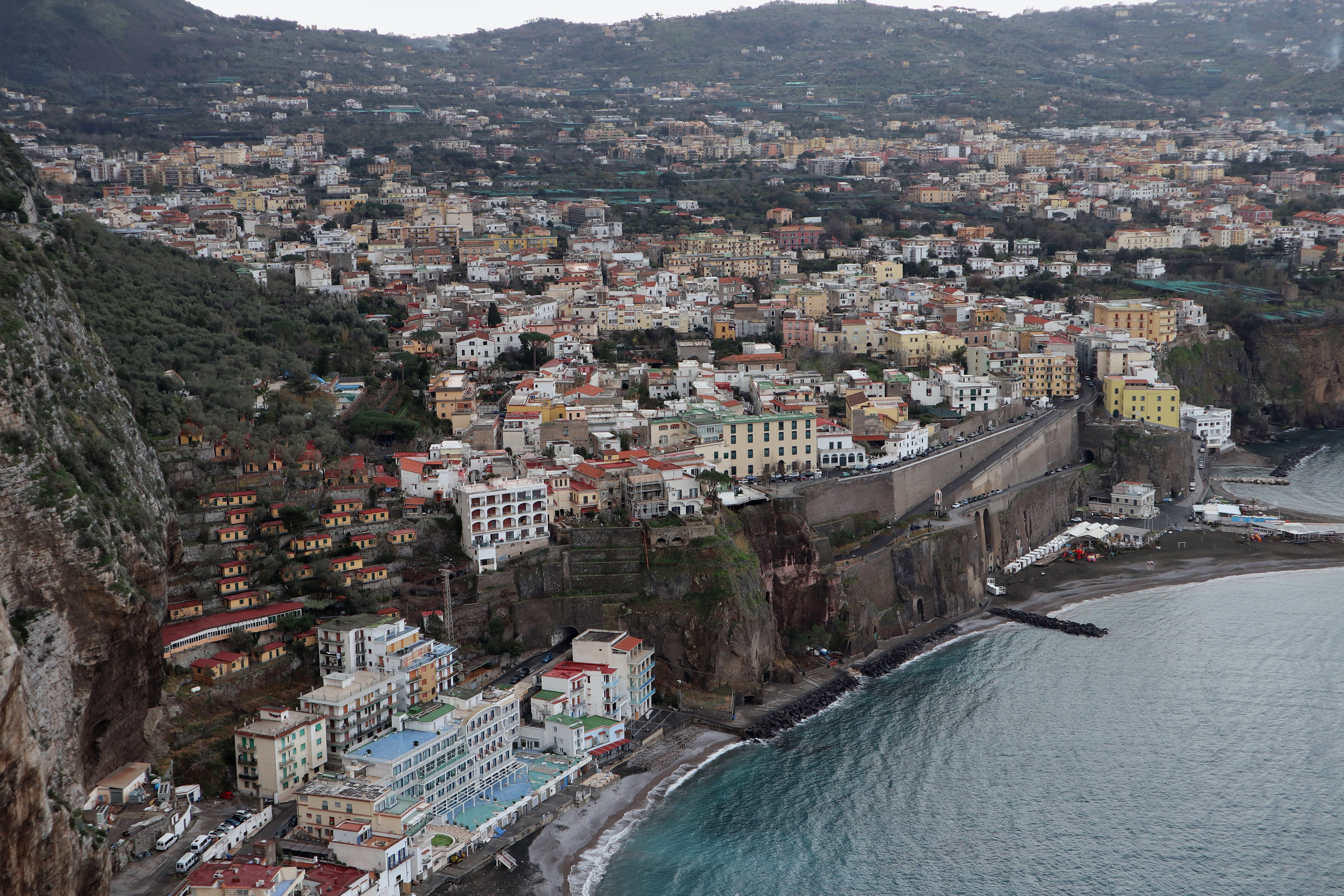

- Coat of arms

- Location within Italy Location within Campania
- Coordinates: 40°38′N 14°25′E
- Country: Italy
- Region: Campania
- Metropolitan city: Naples (NA)
- Frazioni: Alberi, Casastarita

Government
  - Mayor: Giuseppe Tito

Area
  - Total: 2.2 km^{2} (0.85 sq mi)
- Elevation: 111 m (364 ft)

Population (31 December 2010)
  - Total: 8,041
  - Density: 3,700/km^{2} (9,500/sq mi)
- Demonym: Metesi
- Time zone: UTC+1 (CET)
  - Summer (DST): UTC+2 (CEST)
- Postal code: 80062
- Dialing code: 081
- Website: Official website

Meta (also unofficially known as Meta di Sorrento) is a comune (municipality) in the Metropolitan City of Naples in the Italian region Campania, located about 25 km southeast of Naples.

Meta borders the municipalities of Piano di Sorrento and Vico Equense.

== See also ==
- Sorrentine Peninsula
- Amalfi Coast
