= Monte di Procida =

Monte di Procida Monte 'e Proceta (Neapolitan)
- Comune
- Comune di Monte di Procida
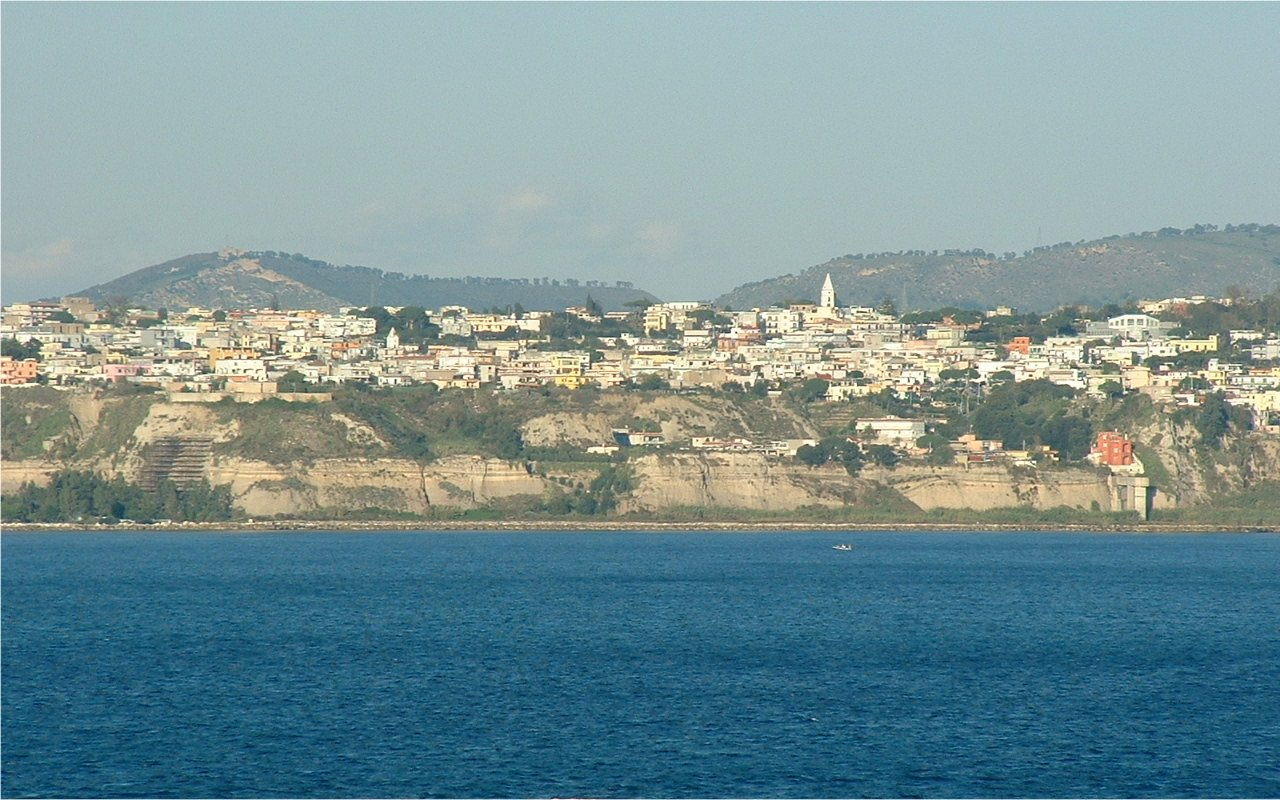
- Monte di Procida seen from Procida Island

- Coat of arms

- Location within Italy Location within Campania
- Coordinates: 40°48′N 14°3′E
- Country: Italy
- Region: Campania
- Metropolitan city: Naples (NA)
- Frazioni: Cappella, Miliscola, Torregaveta

Government
  - Mayor: Salvatore Scotto di Santolo (ORO Monte di Procida)

Area
  - Total: 3.6 km^{2} (1.4 sq mi)
- Elevation: 63 m (207 ft)

Population (30 November 2017)
  - Total: 12,760
  - Density: 3,500/km^{2} (9,200/sq mi)
- Demonym: Montesi
- Time zone: UTC+1 (CET)
  - Summer (DST): UTC+2 (CEST)
- Postal code: 80070
- Dialing code: 081
- Patron saint: Maria Assunta
- Saint day: August 15
- Website: Official website

Monte di Procida (Neapolitan: Monte 'e Proceta) is a comune (municipality) in the Metropolitan City of Naples in the Italian region of Campania, located about 15 kilometres (9.3 mi) west of Naples, facing the island of Procida. Monte di Procida includes the small island of San Martino, which was occupied by the Germans during World War II. Its territory is included in the Campi Flegrei Regional Park.

== Current City Council ==
The Comune di Monte di Procida consists of City Councilors. The council was elected alongside the mayor in 2024. The elected Councilors are listed here.

City Councilors
Name	Party	Votes
Salvatore Scotto di Santolo (Mayor)	ORO Monte di Procida	3,454
Giuseppe (Peppe) Pugliese	Sí Insieme	2,897
Teresa Coppola	PER Monte di Procida	1,146
Marasco Marilù	ORO Monte di Procida	715
Assante Di Cupillo Rocco	ORO Monte di Procida	664
Martino Giovanni	ORO Monte di Procida	650
Turazzo Sergio	Sí Insieme	623
Scotto Daniella Melania	ORO Monte di Procida	458
Barone Ivana	Sí Insieme	453
Schiano Di Cola Luisa	Sí Insieme	425
Scotto Di Carlo Daniela	ORO Monte di Procida	421
Russo Tillo	ORO Monte di Procida	363
Pentangelo Pia Acanfora	ORO Monte di Procida	335
Lubrano Lobianco Giuseppina	ORO Monte di Procida	318
Scotto Di Frega Luisa Detta Lisa	ORO Monte di Procida	287
Massa Michele	ORO Monte di Procida	268
Esposito Simone	ORO Monte di Procida	238

To see previous city councils visit https://www.montediprocida.com/elezioni/index.php

== Mayoral Election History ==
=== 2024 Election ===
Candidate	Votes	Percent	Party	Seats
Salvatore Scotto di Santolo	3,454	46.4%	ORO Monte di Procida	11
Giuseppe (Peppe) Pugliese*	2,897	38.9%	Sí Insieme	4
Teresa Coppola	1,146	15.4%	PER Monte di Procida	1

=== 2020 Election ===
Candidate	Votes	Percent	Party	Seats
Giuseppe (Peppe) Pugliese*	4,499	57.7%	Sí Insieme	11
Francesco Paolo Iannuzzi	2,965	38%	Onda Civica	5
Nunzia Nigro	332	4.3%	NOI per Monte di Procida	0

=== 2015 Election ===
Candidate	Votes	Percent	Party	Seats
Giuseppe (Peppe) Pugliese	3,302	42.5%	Svoltiamo Insieme	11
Rocco Assante di Cupillo	2,110	27.2%	Fare Futuro	3
Carmela Pugliese	1,251	16.1%	Rinasci Monte	1
Gennaro Di Mare	1,105	14.2%	Monte di Procida 2.0	1

=== 2011 Election ===
Candidate	Votes	Percent	Party	Seats
Francesco Paolo Iannuzzi*	4,126	49.1%	Un Monte migliore	11
Lenardo Coppola	3,590	42.7%	Svolta Popolare	5
Michele Petrone	682	8.1%	Per Monte di Procida	0

=== 2006 Election ===
Candidate	Votes	Percent	Party	Seats
Francesco Paolo Iannuzzi	4,368	52.5%	Monte di Procida Domani	13
Giuseppe Nicola Coppola*	3,953	47.5%	Uniti con Pippo Coppola	7

=== 2001 Election ===
Candidate	Votes	Percent	Party	Seats
Giuseppe Nicola Coppola	2,690	32.9%	Agorà	13
Francesco Paolo Iannuzzi	2,283	27.9%	Viva Monte di Procida	3
Vincenzo Scotto di Cesare	1,746	21.4%	Insieme	2
Gennaro di Mare*	1,450	17.8%	Casa delle Libertà	2

=== 1997 Election ===
Candidate	Votes	Percent	Party	Seats
Gennaro di Mare	2,336	30.4%	Rinnovamento Montese	13
Antonio Iorio	2,023	26.3%	Alternativa Democratica	3
Salvatore Scotto di Santolo	1,886	24.5%	La Ginestra	2
Gnolfo	1,441	18.7%	Forza Italia	2

*Incumbent

== Twin towns ==
- Ithaca, Greece
- Procida, Italy
- Molise, Italy, since 2001

== See also ==
- Misenum
