= Camposano =

- Comune
- Comune di Camposano
- Coat of arms

- Location within Italy Location within Campania
- Coordinates: 40°57′N 14°32′E
- Country: Italy
- Region: Campania
- Metropolitan city: Naples (NA)
- Frazioni: Faibano

Government
  - Mayor: Francesco Barbato

Area
  - Total: 3.3 km^{2} (1.3 sq mi)
- Elevation: 48 m (157 ft)

Population (31 December 2010)
  - Total: 5,450
  - Density: 1,700/km^{2} (4,300/sq mi)
- Demonym: Camposanesi
- Time zone: UTC+1 (CET)
  - Summer (DST): UTC+2 (CEST)
- Postal code: 80030
- Dialing code: 081
- Website: Official website

Camposano is a comune (municipality) in the Metropolitan City of Naples in the Italian region Campania, located about 25 kilometres (16 mi) northeast of Naples.

Camposano borders the following municipalities: Cicciano, Cimitile, Comiziano, Nola.
