= Lettere =

- Comune
- Comune di Lettere
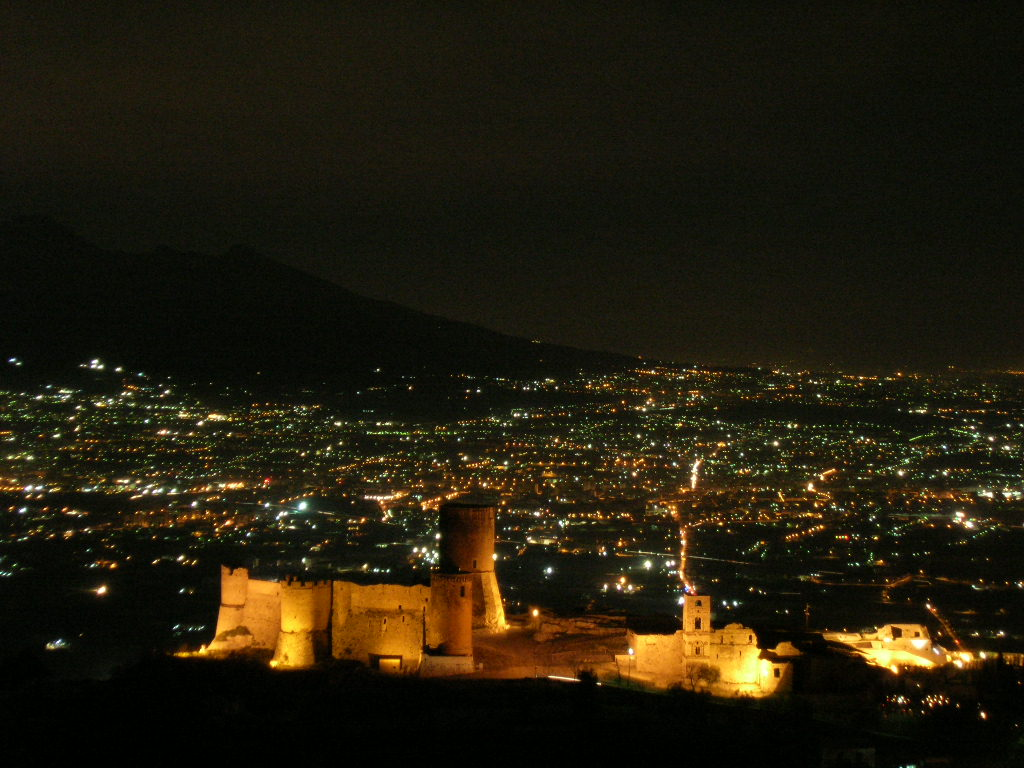

- Coat of arms

- Location within Italy Location within Campania
- Coordinates: 40°42′N 14°33′E
- Country: Italy
- Region: Campania
- Metropolitan city: Naples (NA)

Government
  - Mayor: Sebastiano Giordano

Area
  - Total: 12.02 km^{2} (4.64 sq mi)
- Elevation: 356 m (1,168 ft)

Population (31 December 2010)
  - Total: 6,228
  - Density: 518.1/km^{2} (1,342/sq mi)
- Demonym: Letteresi
- Time zone: UTC+1 (CET)
  - Summer (DST): UTC+2 (CEST)
- Postal code: 80050
- Dialing code: 081
- Website: Official website

Lettere is a comune (municipality) in the Metropolitan City of Naples in the southern central Italian region Campania, located about 30 km (19 mi) southeast of Naples.

Lettere borders the following municipalities: Angri, Casola di Napoli, Corbara, Gragnano, Ravello, Sant'Antonio Abate, Tramonti.

It was built near Ancient Liternum.

From 987 it was the see of a bishopric, which was renamed Roman Catholic Diocese of Lettere-Gragnano (viz.) from 1169 till its merger into the Diocese of Castellammare di Stabia. In 1968 it was nominally restored as Latin Titular bishopric of Lettere.

== See also ==
- List of Catholic dioceses in Italy

== Sources and external links ==
- GCatholic - residential and titular bishoppic
