= Cimitile =

- Comune
- Comune di Cimitile
- Location within Italy Location within Campania
- Coordinates: 40°56′26.3″N 14°31′28.3″E
- Country: Italy
- Region: Campania
- Metropolitan city: Naples (NA)

Area
  - Total: 2.74 km^{2} (1.06 sq mi)

Population (December 2017)
  - Total: 7,172
  - Density: 2,620/km^{2} (6,780/sq mi)
- Demonym: Cimitilesi
- Time zone: UTC+1 (CET)
  - Summer (DST): UTC+2 (CEST)
- Postal code: 80030
- Dialing code: 081
- Website: Official website

Cimitile is a comune (municipality) in the Metropolitan City of Naples in the Italian region Campania, located about 25 km (16 mi) northeast of Naples. As of 31 December 2017, it had a population of 7 172 and an area of 2.74 km^{2} (1.06 sq mi). In antiquity Cimitile was the necropolis for the town of Nola, and it was here that Paulinus of Nola founded a monastic community in the year 395. Cimitile founded itself inside the coemeterium nolanum, the Paleochristian basilicas.

Cimitile borders the following municipalities: Camposano, Casamarciano, Comiziano, Nola.

== Demographic evolution ==
Historical population

| Year | Pop. | ±% |
|---|---|---|
| 1861 | 4,067 | — |
| 1871 | 3,552 | −12.7% |
| 1881 | 3,670 | +3.3% |
| 1901 | 3,957 | +7.8% |
| 1911 | 3,886 | −1.8% |

| Year | Pop. | ±% |
|---|---|---|
| 1921 | 3,792 | −2.4% |
| 1931 | 4,159 | +9.7% |
| 1936 | 4,442 | +6.8% |
| 1951 | 5,058 | +13.9% |
| 1961 | 5,351 | +5.8% |

| Year | Pop. | ±% |
|---|---|---|
| 1971 | 5,107 | −4.6% |
| 1981 | 6,825 | +33.6% |
| 1991 | 6,537 | −4.2% |
| 2001 | 6,840 | +4.6% |

Source: Data from ISTAT
