= Grumo Nevano =

Municipality in Campania, Italy

- Comune
- Comune di Grumo Nevano
- Basilica of San Tammaro at Grumo Nevano.

- Coat of arms

- Location within Italy Location within Campania
- Coordinates: 40°56′N 14°16′E
- Country: Italy
- Region: Campania
- Metropolitan city: Naples (NA)

Government
  - Mayor: Gaetano Di Bernardo

Area
  - Total: 2.9 km^{2} (1.1 sq mi)
- Elevation: 53 m (174 ft)

Population (31 August 2015)
  - Total: 18,058
  - Density: 6,200/km^{2} (16,000/sq mi)
- Demonym(s): Grumesi, Nevanesi
- Time zone: UTC+1 (CET)
  - Summer (DST): UTC+2 (CEST)
- Postal code: 80028
- Dialing code: 081
- Patron saint: San Tammaro
- Saint day: 16 January
- Website: Official website

Grumo Nevano is a comune (municipality) in the Metropolitan City of Naples in the Campania region of Italy, with 17,939 inhabitants.

== Physical geography ==
Bordering the Province of Caserta and located 11 km (6.8 mi) north of the Metropolitan City of Naples, Grumo Nevano is an urban municipality of the Campana lowland. It is made up of the two areas (not frazioni) of Grumo and Nevano, united by urban planning for two centuries and under the administrative one since the 20th century. Grumese territory stands between 44 and 66 m (144 and 217 ft) above sea level.

== History ==
The name of Grumo comes from the Latin grumum, meaning 'cluster' or 'heap' (of houses), whereas the name of Nevano comes from praedium naevianum, which was a property of the Naevia gens.

Before 1863 Grumo and Nevano were two different farmhouses: Grumo included the southern area of the municipality (up to the Basilica of San Tammaro) whereas Nevano included the northern area. In 1700 maps it appeared as Grumi.

Grumo Nevano, like all the other municipalities in the northern area of Naples, has Oscan origins. Some Samnite graves were casually found within the residential area during the 1960s and 1970s and two Latin inscriptions are evident, probably from Atella.

== Twin towns – sister cities ==
- Żagań, Poland
