= Brusciano =

- Comune
- Comune di Brusciano
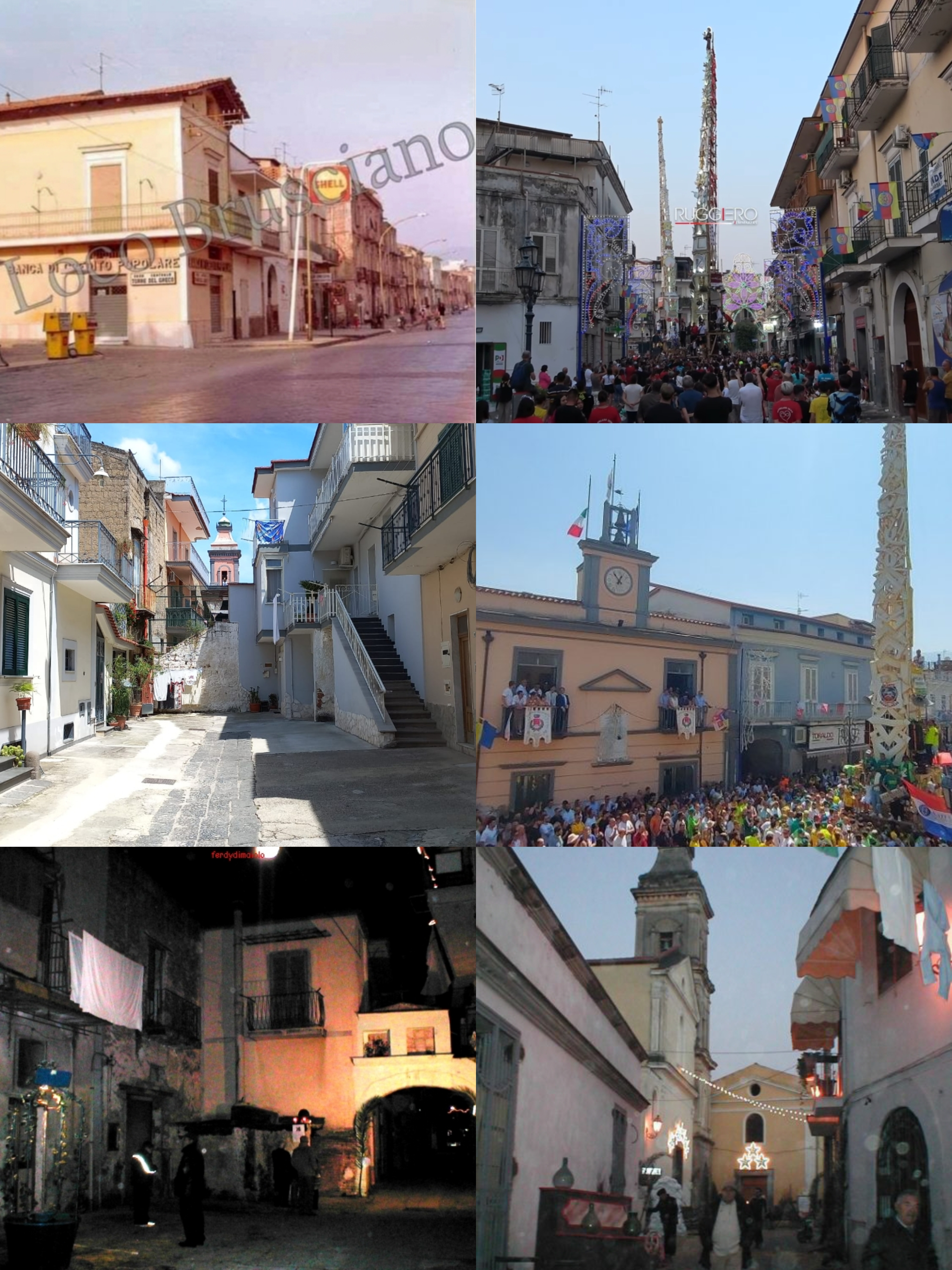

- Coat of arms

- Location within Italy Location within Campania
- Coordinates: 40°55′N 14°25′E
- Country: Italy
- Region: Campania
- Metropolitan city: Naples (NA)
- Frazioni: De Ruggiero, La Scorza, Pastena

Government
  - Mayor: Peppe Montanile

Area
  - Total: 5 km^{2} (1.9 sq mi)
- Elevation: 27 m (89 ft)

Population (31 August 2022)
  - Total: 15,677
  - Density: 3,100/km^{2} (8,100/sq mi)
- Demonym: Bruscianesi
- Time zone: UTC+1 (CET)
  - Summer (DST): UTC+2 (CEST)
- Postal code: 80031
- Dialing code: 081
- Patron saint: Saint Sebastian
- Saint day: 20 January
- Website: Official website

Brusciano is a municipality in the Metropolitan City of Naples, in Italy, on the slopes of Mount Vesuvius. Situated inland north-east of Naples, 10 miles from center city, the ancient village of rural vocation has developed along the way National Puglia, in the stretch that connects the east of the capital and Pomigliano d'Arco and Nola.

Its territory in the middle of the plain bell sits in the shadow of the area Vesuvius, is between the slopes of Monte Somma and the plain of Acerra is crossed by Regi Lagni. Has a particular geological origin: ash, lava and volcanic tuff resulting from the Vesuvius formed the substrate on which it was formed on local soil. The surface layer shows a depth of order few meters, with a particular composition of elements and sandy-clay mixed with volcanic ash, lava and pumice.
