= San Gennaro Vesuviano =

- Comune
- Comune di San Gennaro Vesuviano
- Location within Italy Location within Campania
- Coordinates: 40°52′N 14°32′E
- Country: Italy
- Region: Campania
- Metropolitan city: Naples (NA)
- Frazioni: Aprile, Giugliani, Ruocco, Sommese

Government
  - Mayor: Antonio Russo

Area
  - Total: 7.01 km^{2} (2.71 sq mi)
- Elevation: 56 m (184 ft)

Population (31-7-2022)
  - Total: 12,284
  - Density: 1,750/km^{2} (4,540/sq mi)
- Demonym: Sangennaresi
- Time zone: UTC+1 (CET)
  - Summer (DST): UTC+2 (CEST)
- Postal code: 80040
- Dialing code: 081
- Patron saint: St. Januarius
- Saint day: 19 September
- Website: Official website

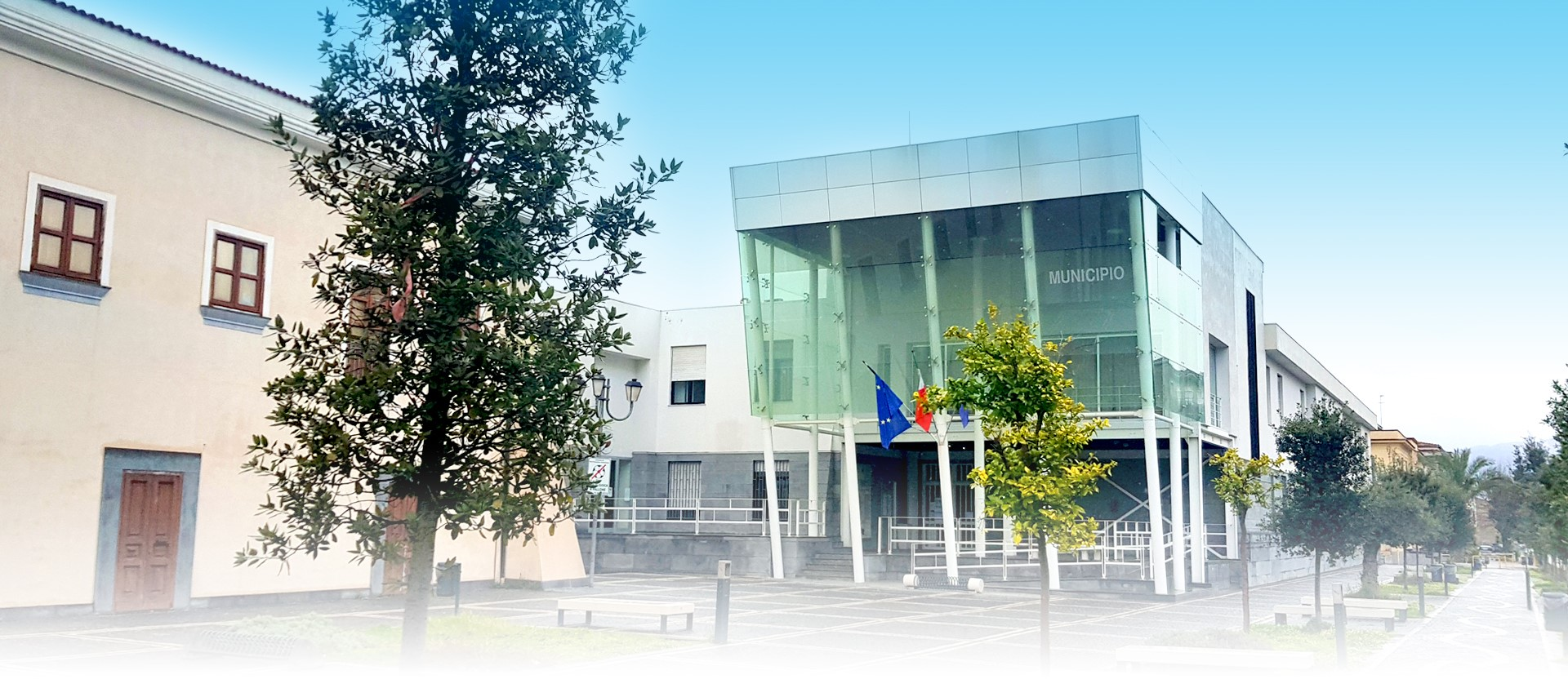
The city hall of San Gennaro Vesuviano

San Gennaro Vesuviano is a comune and town located in the Metropolitan City of Naples, Campania, in southern Italy.

== Geography ==
San Gennaro Vesuviano is located in the country-side area around Nola (the so-called “agro Nolano") approximately 25 kilometers east of Naples and nine kilometers from Nola.

== History ==
=== Ancient history ===
The comune of San Gennaro Vesuviano is positioned in the site of the Pianura Campana (the Campania Plain – once named the Planum Palmae), surrounded by the Vesuvius and Monte Sant’Angelo.

Archeological findings date early settlements back to the Bronze Age, around 2000 BC, when a sudden eruption of the Vesuvius wiped out the ancient communities settled in the area. Only several centuries later did new settlers repopulate the area.

=== 17th century ===
The area remained uninhabited until 1631, when the Count of San Valentino and Marquis of Lauro donated it to the monastic Order of Friars Minor, who built here a convent; the inhabited center which grew around it was initially a neighbourhood of Palma Campania and later a self-governing entity by decree of King Ferdinand II of Two Sicilies. The Marquis also established the local Fair which is held every year in name of Saint Januarius

=== Nazi occupation and Allies arrival ===
During the Nazi occupation, a young man was executed by Nazi soldiers because he was found outside during curfew. Several livestock were seized by the German armed forces and consequently killed. The area of Pozzo Pagnotti was bombed by USA forces while a British fighter plane was taken down and fell near Via Musiello, killing the pilot.

On 9 September the Allies arrived in Salerno and on the 28th the English forces reached San Gennaro Vesuviano. The men were those from the 46th Infantry Division under the command of Major-General John Hawkesworth. A group of local inhabitants went to meet the newly arrived English forces, warning them about the location of land mines previously placed around the area by German forces.

== Economy ==
Nowadays, San Gennaro Vesuviano belongs to a larger industrial district which consists of a territorial consortium of small businesses with a discernible specialization in the general manufacturing industry. Activities include mostly food processing.

Despite the overpopulation, agriculture is still performed by local farmers and small landowners: activities include hazelnut, grain and tobacco growing (nicotina tabacum: indigenous of North-America) as well as vineyards Pig and cow breeding are not relevant industries. There are several specialized horse breeders.

== Transportation ==
San Gennaro is connected to the A30 Caserta-Salerno highway both through the Palma Campania junction and the SS-268 (a state-run toll-free road).

It is also served by RFI station Palma-San Gennaro.

== Churches and Monuments ==
Catholic Church of the Franciscans Convent Catholic Church od Saints Joachim and Anna Giugliani Chapel Sommesi Chapel Kingdom Hall of Jehovah Witnesses

Franciscan Convent (dated ca 1600). Memorial for the fallen soldiers Padre Pio statue
