= Sant'Antimo =

- Comune
- Comune di Sant'Antimo
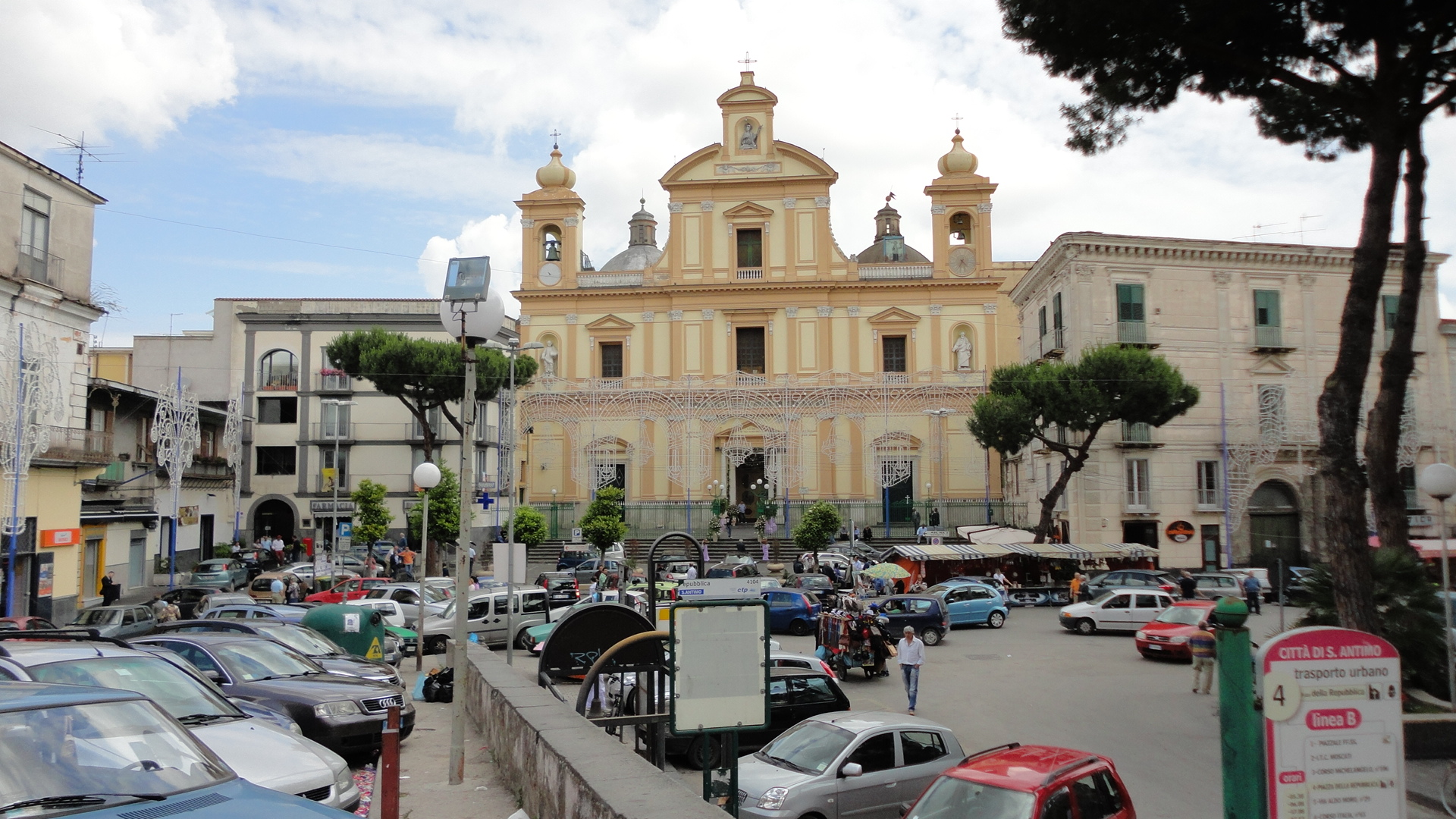

- Coat of arms

- Location within Italy Location within Campania
- Coordinates: 40°57′N 14°14′E
- Country: Italy
- Region: Campania
- Metropolitan city: Naples (NA)

Government
  - Mayor: Francesco Piemonte

Area
  - Total: 5.84 km^{2} (2.25 sq mi)
- Elevation: 58 m (190 ft)

Population (30 September 2015)
  - Total: 33,953
  - Density: 5,810/km^{2} (15,100/sq mi)
- Demonym: Santantimesi
- Time zone: UTC+1 (CET)
  - Summer (DST): UTC+2 (CEST)
- Postal code: 80029
- Dialing code: 081
- Website: Official website

Sant'Antimo is a comune (municipality) in the Metropolitan City of Naples in the Italian region Campania, located about 13 km (8.1 mi) north of Naples.

== Geography ==
The municipality is located at 67 m above sea level and is 16 km from the centre of Naples.

It is an urban centre of the Pianura Campana, extending from the Via Appia (to the east) and from the railway line Naples-Foggia (to the west), to the convergence point of a dense road network coming from different centres of this section.

The area extends in the north of Naples and from the historical and geographical point of view, it is part of the frattese area.

== Climate ==
The climate is warm and temperate in Sant'Antimo and rainfall is much higher in winter than in summer. The average annual temperature in Sant'Antimo is 15.5 °C, while 911 mm is the average annual rainfall. The driest month is July and the greatest amount of precipitation occurs in November, with an average of 142 mm, while August is the hottest month of the year with an average temperature of 23.5 °C.

== History ==
=== The myth of the foundation ===
The foundation of Sant'Antimo is linked to an ancient legend concerning the prince Antemio, duke of Naples. According to the legend, during a usual hunting day, the prince arrived at the point where the church of Sant'Antimo rises now. His horse stopped there, so the prince decided to spend the night in that place. While he was sleeping, he saw in his dream an old man dressed as a priest, Sant'Antimo, who told the prince that he had chosen him to build a church in his honour. As soon as he woke up, the prince immediately ran to look for the best local engineers along with a lot of workers. The workers built the church three times because, although they built it during the day, it fell at night. Then on the fourth day, the local people arrived pushed by curiosity and, knowing what had happened there, a man told Prince Antemio that the saint wanted the church to be built by the peasants of the place who every day blessed the earth with their own sweat. Then the prince agreed and each person in the town set to work for building the church: from that time it has never fallen anymore.

== Monuments and points of interest ==
=== Shrine of Sant'Antimo Priest and Martyr ===
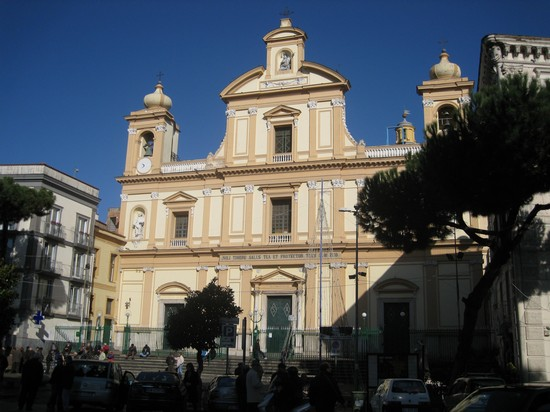

The shrine of Sant'Antimo Priest and Martyr, located in the historic city centre, is a monument of faith, art and history, raised to the memory of the holy priest Antimo, martyred in Rome on 11 May 305 during the persecution of Christians under the emperor Diocletian.

=== Church of the SS. Annunziata and San Giuseppe ===
The church of SS. Annunziata and San Giuseppe was built in 1490 on a pre-existing chapel belonged to the Confraternity of the Disciplined. In 1807 a parish was erected because the much-grown fellow citizens started to feel the need to provide for their own spiritual wealth, even at the suggestion of the municipality. In 1990, on the occasion of the fifth centenary of the foundation, the church was endowed with a majestic pipe organ, which constitutes an invaluable heritage for the whole city community.

The style is Baroque and it wasn't unchanged, despite the various restoration works that have been carried out over the centuries. The church has a single nave, a Latin cross ending with an apse; on the main altar there is a large Annunciation painting, while one of the ten side altars is dedicated to St. Joseph. The facade of the church is divided into two compartments: in the lower level there is an appreciable portal, while in the upper one, under the tympanum, there is a spacious window, which lights up the interiors. There's also a three-storied belltower ending with an octagonal space next to the church. Between the end of the 12th and the beginning of the 13th century, the University of Sant'Antimo had a small chapel built, with an attached hospital, entrusted to the Confraternity of the Disciplined, under the name of SS. Maria dell'Annunziata. Later, using its funds, the community of Sant'Antimo began the building of a large new church for public worship, whose plant was very similar to the current one. After the 1980 earthquake, renovations were carried out and revealed the presence of a crypt on the right side of the main altar. The bell tower to the left of the façade was instead built in 1950.

=== Military architecture ===
==== Baronial castle in Sant'Antimo ====
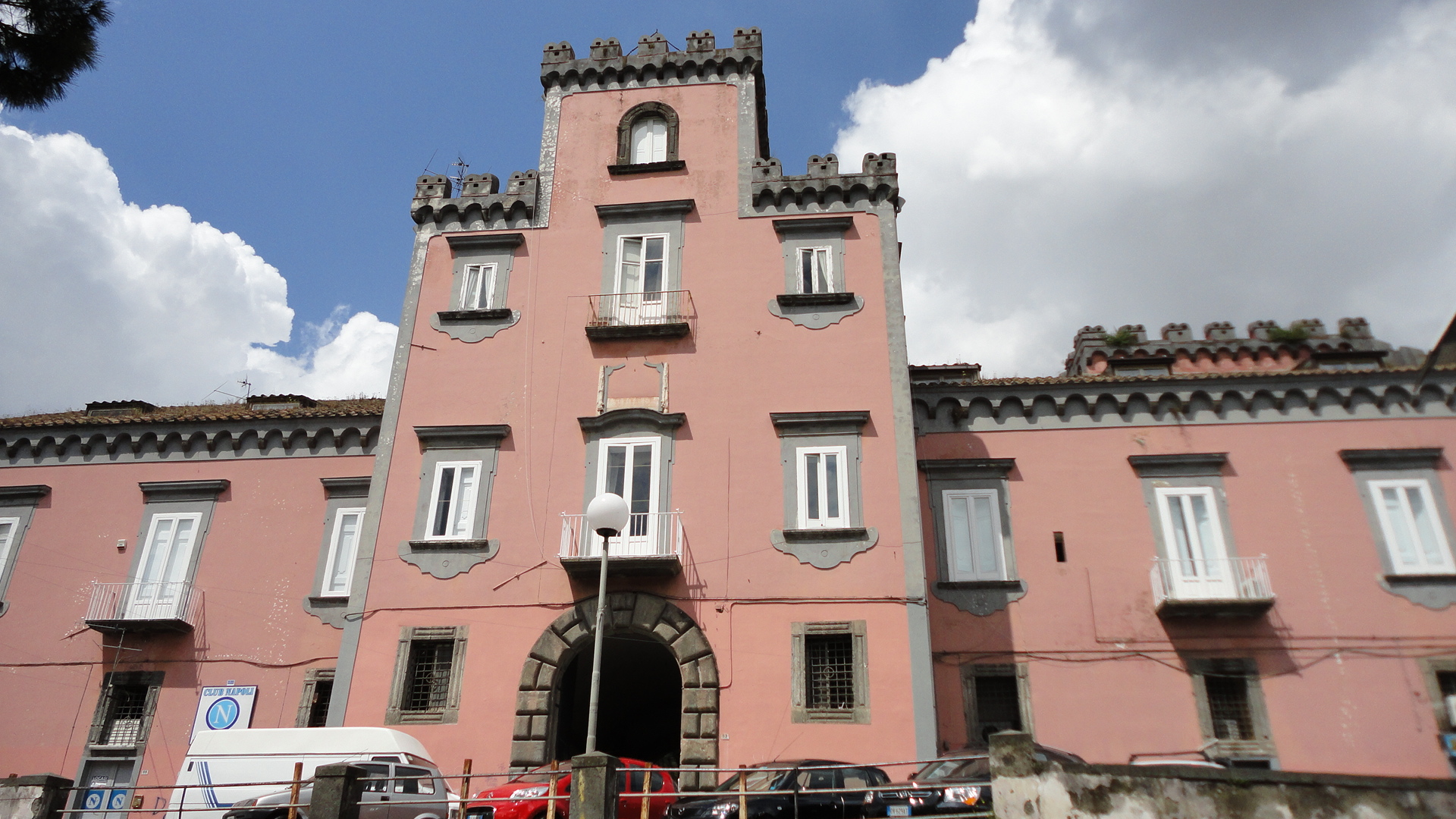

The Baronial Castle is located in the centre of the town, in the main square, today known as Piazza della Repubblica.

This castle was built in Sant'Antimo during the Renaissance, as can be seen from the characteristic architectural structures: the entrance hall, the loggia in piperno and the loggias. The central tower and the lateral towers, instead, remind of the original medieval structure.

Until the early 1800s it was surrounded by two gardens: one in front of the building and near the current Piazza della Repubblica, the other one was placed behind the building and covered the entire area of Via Trieste and Trento.

The noble feudal lords who lived there, the Dukes Revertera until 1629, the Dukes and Princes Ruffo and the Mirelli princes up to 1806, administered the fief of Sant'Antimo, influencing the socio-economic development, since they had the right to rent feudal lands in exchange of the payment of a tax and to appoint the judge of the territory for the administration of justice; furthermore, they had the power to validate the appointments, but also to dismiss the elected candidates in the Municipal Administration.

In 1807, after the subversive law on fideicommissum, the feudal system was abolished and consequently the feudal owners of Sant'Antimo were succeeded by private owners.

== Economy ==
Sant'Antimo was an important agricultural centre until the middle of the twentieth century, when the treatment of pomaces allowed this town to play the industrial role of the world's leading producer of a product known as "The Cremore of Tartarus". The Cremore of Tartaro, produced through heat treatment from rests of pomaces, was then defined by the Encyclopædia Britannica as "S. Antimo's Cremore ". By that time, education spread and a professional class was formed: men like Nicola Romeo, founder of Alfa Romeo and Cardinal Alessandro Verde, were born here during this flourishing period. The town is also known for another local product, the "Noci Aversane". Its role as leading producer continued until the end of the fifties, when the arrival of Californian and Mediterranean products caused a crisis in the domestic market. Nowadays, handcraft has a productive driving role and small family businesses are the backbone of the local economy. Tourism is linked to the patronal feast, with one of the last examples of "flight of the Angels" still present in Italy, which takes place on the last Sunday of May or in the first one of June.
