= Roccarainola =

- Comune
- Comune di Roccarainola
- Coat of arms

- Location within Italy Location within Campania
- Coordinates: 40°58′N 14°34′E
- Country: Italy
- Region: Campania
- Metropolitan city: Naples (NA)
- Frazioni: Gargani, Piazza, Polvica, Rione Fellino, Sasso

Government
  - Mayor: Giuseppe Russo

Area
  - Total: 28.1 km^{2} (10.8 sq mi)
- Elevation: 102 m (335 ft)

Population (28 January 2025)
  - Total: 6,513
  - Density: 232/km^{2} (600/sq mi)
- Demonym: Rocchesi or Roccarainolesi
- Time zone: UTC+1 (CET)
  - Summer (DST): UTC+2 (CEST)
- Postal code: 80030
- Dialing code: 081
- ISTAT code: 063065
- Patron saint: St. John the Baptist and St. Agnello the Abbot
- Saint day: June 24 and December 14
- Website: Official website

Roccarainola is a comune (municipality) in the Metropolitan City of Naples in the Italian region Campania, located about 30 km (19 mi) northeast of Naples.

The name of Roccarainola is composed of two parts, the first, refers to a hill (appunto rocca) on which a castle once stood, and the second to a person's name of Lombard origin, Ragino or Raino. According to some, the term Rainola is linked to the term rava, meaning cliff, to which the term rocca (rock) was later added, where the castle was built.

== Geography ==
Roccarainola is located in the Upper Nola area of Naples, and sits at a central position between the borders of the Province of Caserta, the Province of Benevento, and the Province of Avellino.
