= 1883 Casamicciola earthquake =

Earthquake in Italy

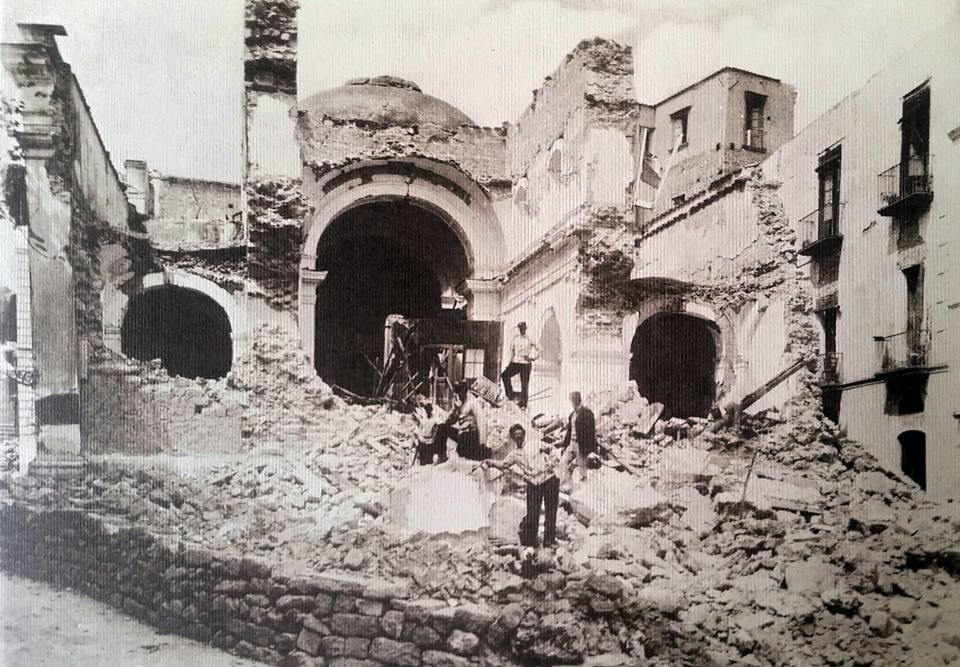

- Location within Italy
- Local date: 28 July 1883
- Local time: 20:25 CET
- Magnitude: 4.2–5.5 M_{w}
- Depth: 1 km (0.62 mi)
- Epicenter: 40.7°N 13.9°E
- Type: Volcanic
- Areas affected: Italy
- Max. intensity: MMI XI (Extreme)
- Casualties: 2,313–3,100 dead, 762 injured

The 1883 Casamicciola earthquake, also known as the Ischia earthquake occurred on 28 July at 20:25 local time (Central European Time) on the island of Ischia in the Gulf of Naples in Italy. Although the earthquake had an estimated moment magnitude (M_{w}) of 4.2–5.5, considered moderate in size, it caused intense ground shaking that was assigned XI (Extreme) on the Modified Mercalli intensity scale. Between 2,313 and 3,100 people were killed, and there was severe damage in Casamicciola, with 80 percent of all homes destroyed. This earthquake was exceptionally destructive for its magnitude mainly due to its shallow focal depth.

== Tectonic setting ==
Ischia island is situated in the circular caldera which forms the Phlegraean Fields of volcanoes. The volcanic field itself is part of the greater Campanian volcanic arc. The island's highest point, Monte Epomeo, is not a volcanic cone. Instead, it is a geological horst, a block of volcanic material deposited by eruptions that have been uplifted by active faulting.

Destructive earthquakes affecting the island have been recorded since the mid-18th century. In 1762, architect Luigi Vanvitelli experienced two successive shocks on the morning of 12 July. An earthquake on 18 March 1796 destroyed 50 buildings and killed seven. At least 29 people died and about 50 were injured during an earthquake on February 2, 1828. Italian chemist Nicola Covelli was on the island when it struck. All buildings in upper Casamicciola were affected. Part of the Santa Maria Maddalena nave collapsed, crushing attendees of a religious service. Damage from the earthquake was surveyed by Charles Lyell. Earthquakes in 1841, 1852, 1863 and 1867 continued to damage Casamicciola. A 1917 memoir by Vilhelm Bergsøe documented the earthquake of 1867—it was also experienced by Norwegian playwright Henrik Ibsen.

The last major earthquake prior to 1883 was on 4 March 1881. The earthquake was destructive in northern Ischia. An official report stated that 2,952 structures were heavily damaged and 290 collapsed. Of the 127 fatalities, 121 were recorded in Casamicciola, five in Fango and one in Lacco Ameno. About 300 families became homeless.

== Earthquake ==
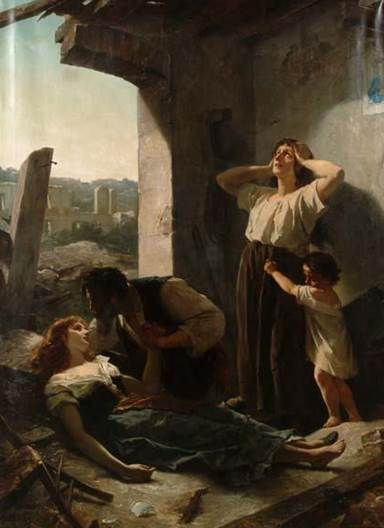
Episode after 1883 earthquake at Casamicciola (1884) by Rodolfo Morgari

The earthquake occurred on the northern slopes of Mount Epomeo along a near-vertical fault with an estimated length of 2 km (1.2 mi). This depth is also consistent with the maximum depth where earthquakes are recorded and the location of the brittle–ductile transition zone, where rocks are able to fracture and cause earthquakes. An east-west or east-northeast–west-southwest fault structure was suggested as the cause of the earthquake. The earthquake's moment magnitude was estimated at between 4.6 and 5.2. Based on the documented observations, an east-west striking fault plane, measuring 2.5 by 3.4 km^{2} (0.97 by 1.31 sq mi), was obtained and plausibly represent the source of the rupture.

Earthquakes on Ischia have been relatively small in magnitude (≤ 5.5 M_{w}), although damage and losses have been high. Prior to 1883, two earthquakes in 1828 and 1881 also caused major destruction. Another earthquake in 2017 measuring 3.9 M_{w} caused two deaths and significant damage. Most earthquakes on the island are limited to the first 2–3 km (1.2–1.9 mi) depth of the crust which is seismogenic as at deeper depth, volcanic heat prevents brittle failure required to sustain earthquakes.

== Impact ==
The quake was felt with a maximum intensity of XI around a 3 km^{2} (1.2 sq mi) area, or 1.5 km (0.93 mi) from the epicenter, in the northern part of Ischia. Unrepaired structures that were previously damaged by the 1881 earthquake were totally destroyed. The earthquake was most devastating in the northern part of the city of Casamicciola, collapsing or seriously damaging many homes. Private buildings, hotels, churches, and country houses were among the many infrastructures destroyed by the earthquake. Damage was reported in every part of the island, with only a handful of buildings left untouched by the quake.

There were at least 2,313 fatalities with the majority in Casamicciola, standing at 1,784. The population of Casamicciola at the time was 4,300, and all homes, with the exception of one, were damaged or destroyed. In Lacco Ameno, 146 residents died. An additional 345 deaths was recorded in Forio. Ten fatalities occurred in Barano d'Ischia, while there was another 28 in Serrara Fontana. In addition to the deaths, 762 were injured.

== In popular culture ==
The metaphors Qui succede Casamicciola (literally meaning "Casamicciola happens here") and Faccio una Casamicciola (literally meaning "I make a Casamicciola") were derived from effects of the earthquake. These metaphors are used to describe a state of calamity, grief, chaos and helplessness.

During a dialogue in the 1960 film Chi si ferma è perduto, the grandfather of a character was said to have landed in Messina on the day of the earthquake.

Italian philosopher Benedetto Croce was vacationing on the island at the time of the earthquake. Both his parents and only sister were killed while he was trapped under rubble. He was rescued from the rubble after two nights, suffering a broken leg and arm. According to his daughter, he experienced nightmares about the events and did not return to Ischia.

The ancestors of American television presenter Jimmy Kimmel were residents of Ischia. According to Kimmel, only two family members survived and later emigrated from the island to the United States.

A work by painter Rodolfo Morgari titled Episode after 1883 earthquake at Casamicciola, was exhibited at Turin in 1884.

== Gallery ==
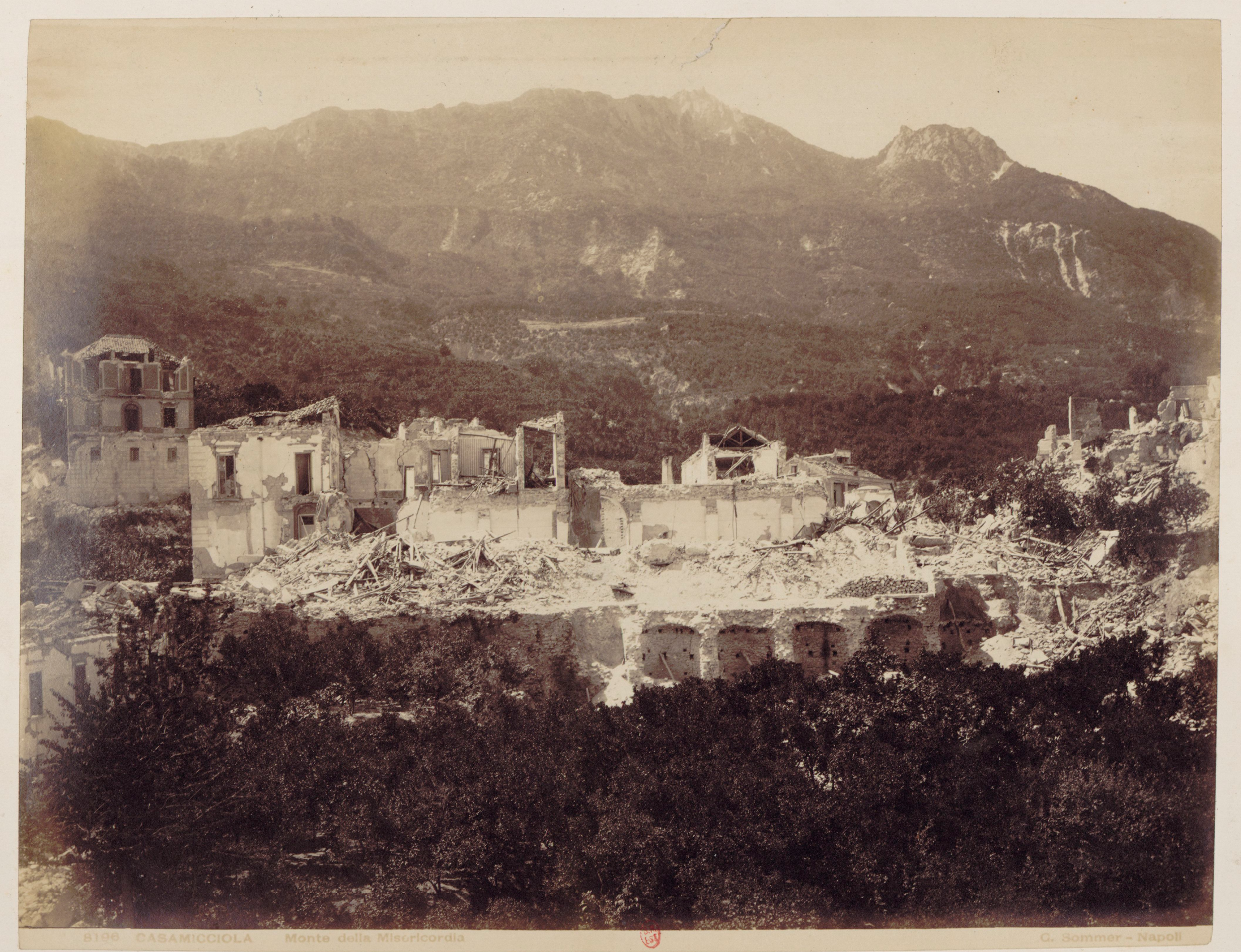

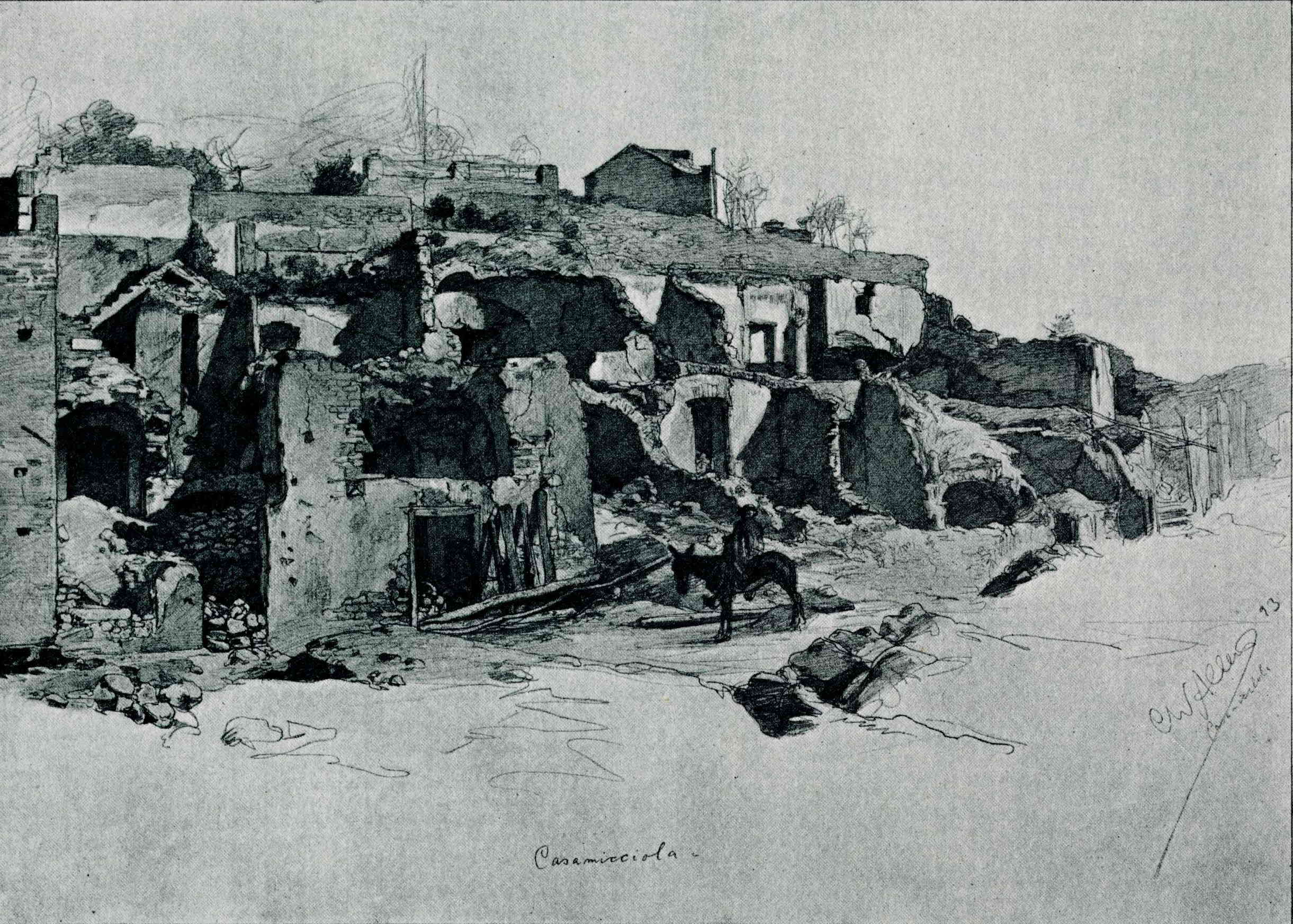

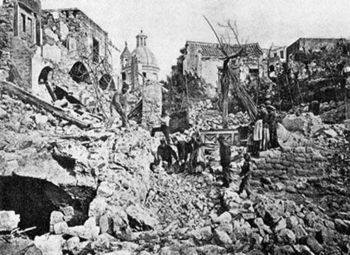

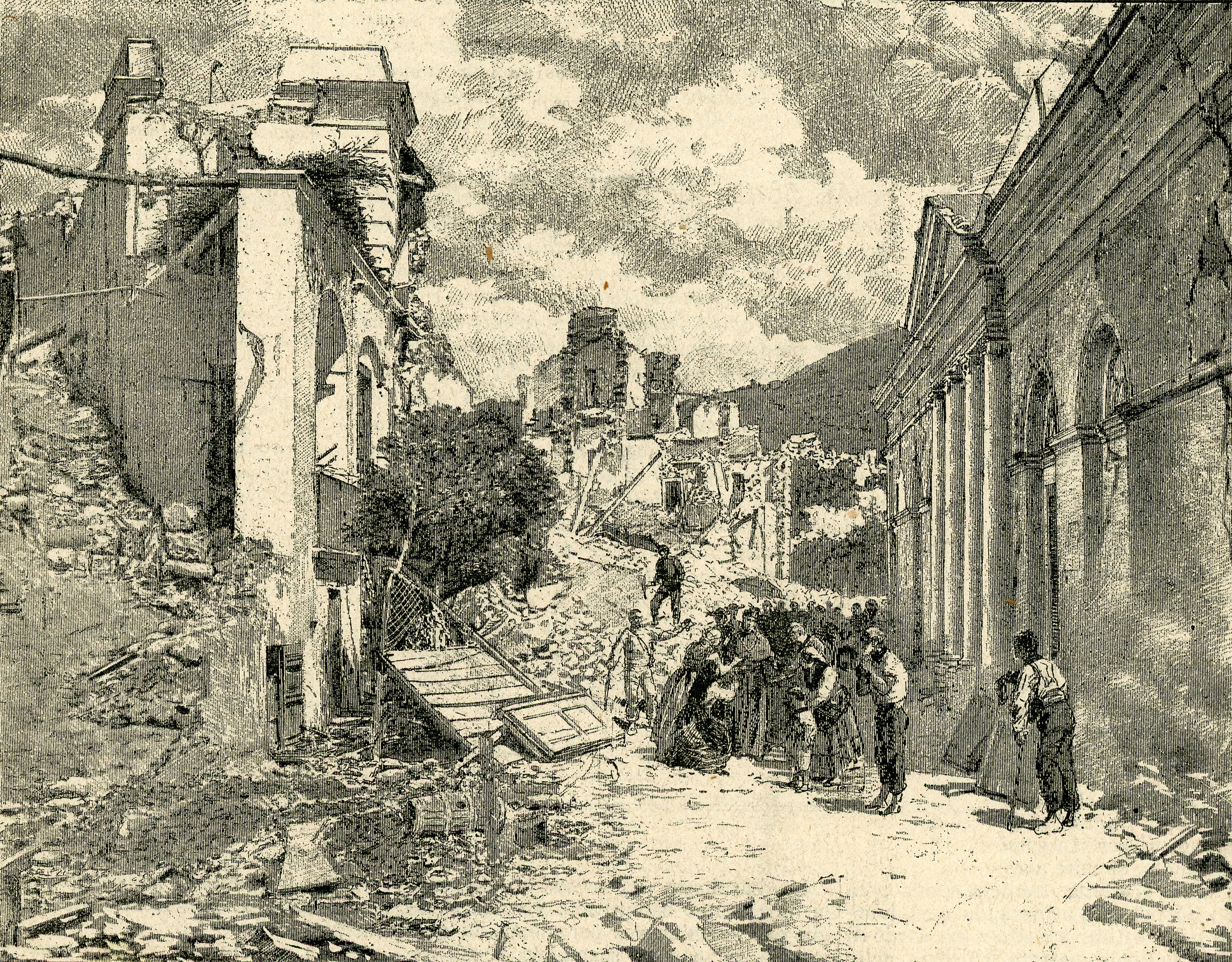

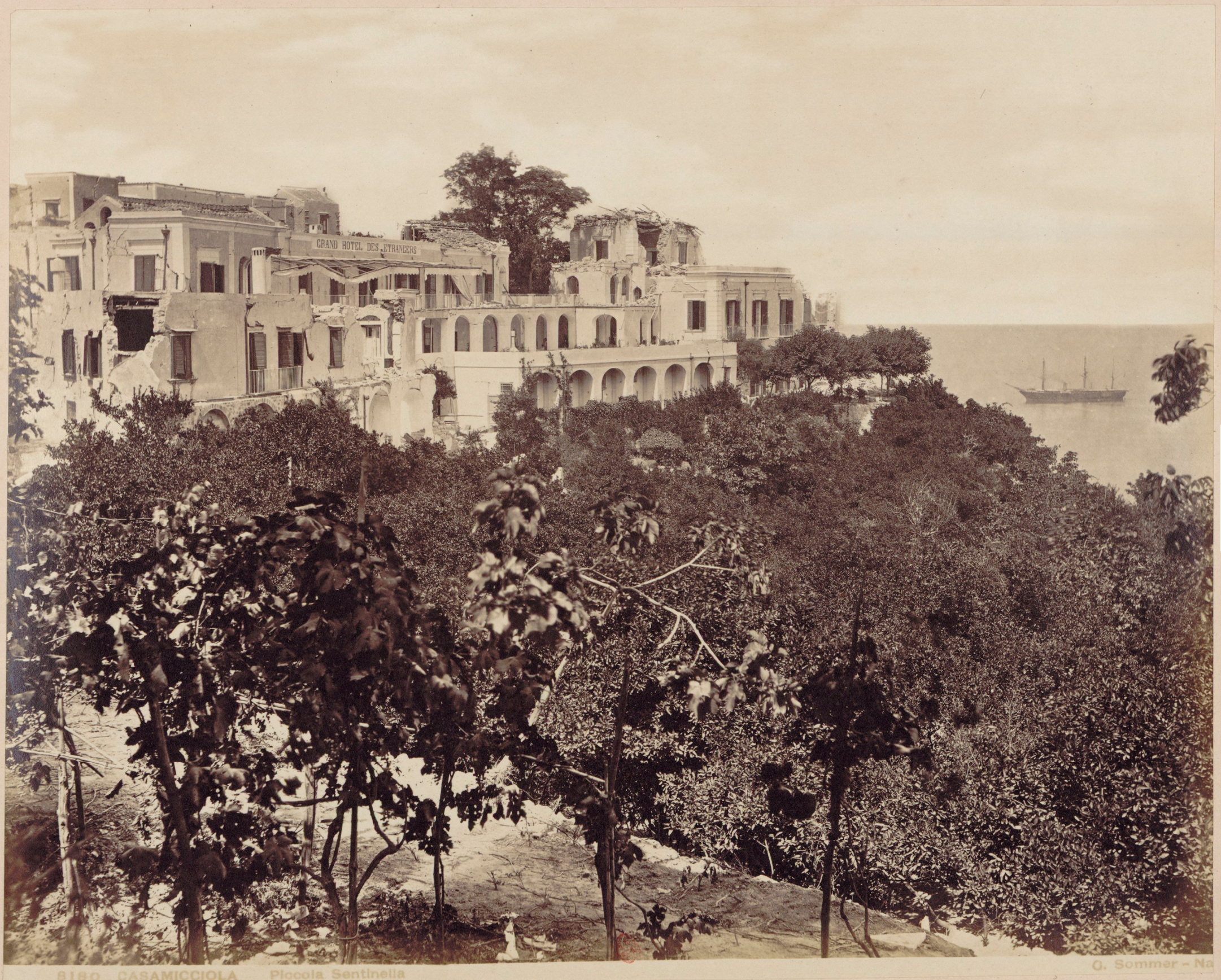

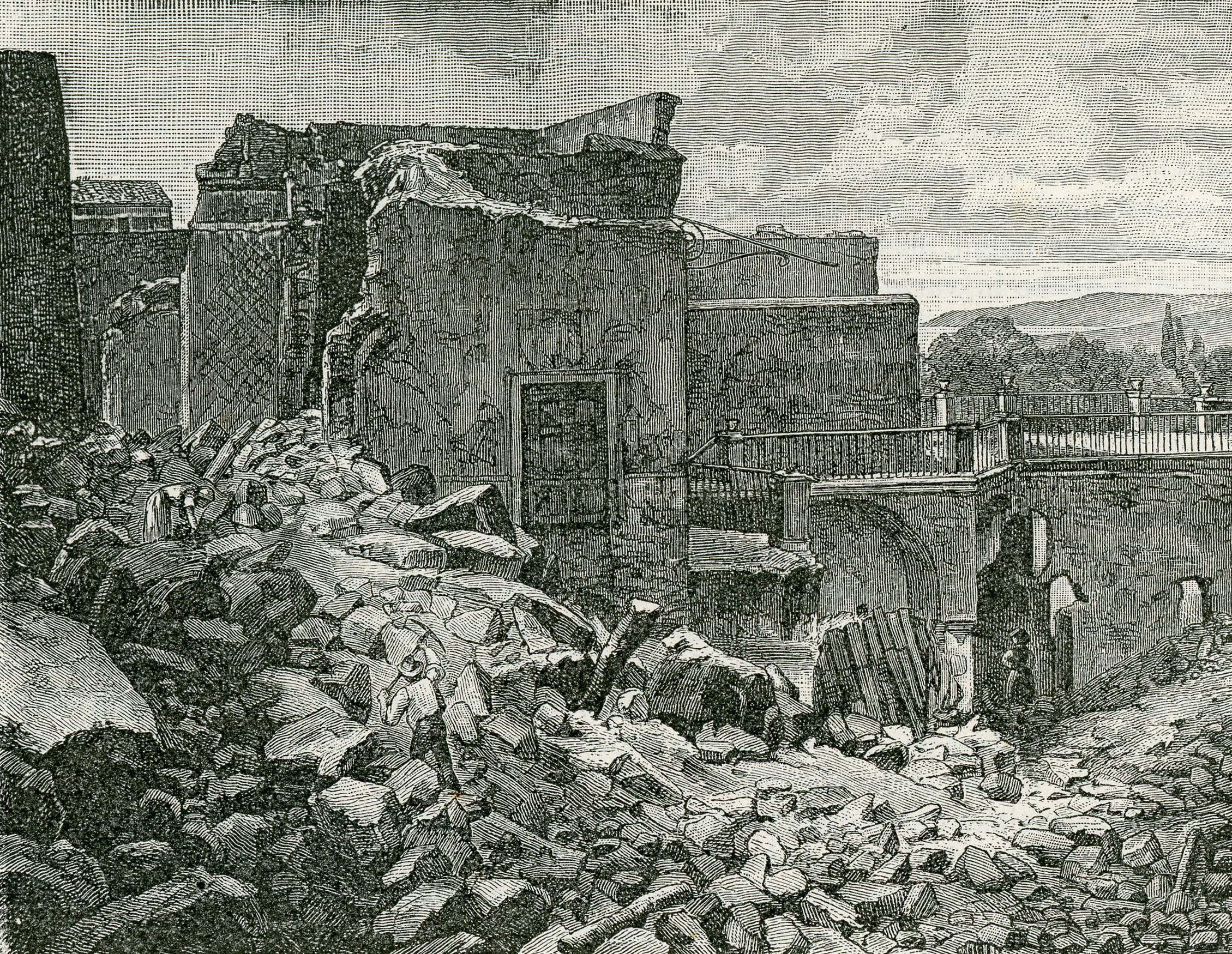

== See also ==
- List of earthquakes in Italy
