= Sant'Antonio al Mortito =

Church of Sant'Antonio al Mortito
- Church of Sant'Antonio al Mortito in Casamicciola Terme
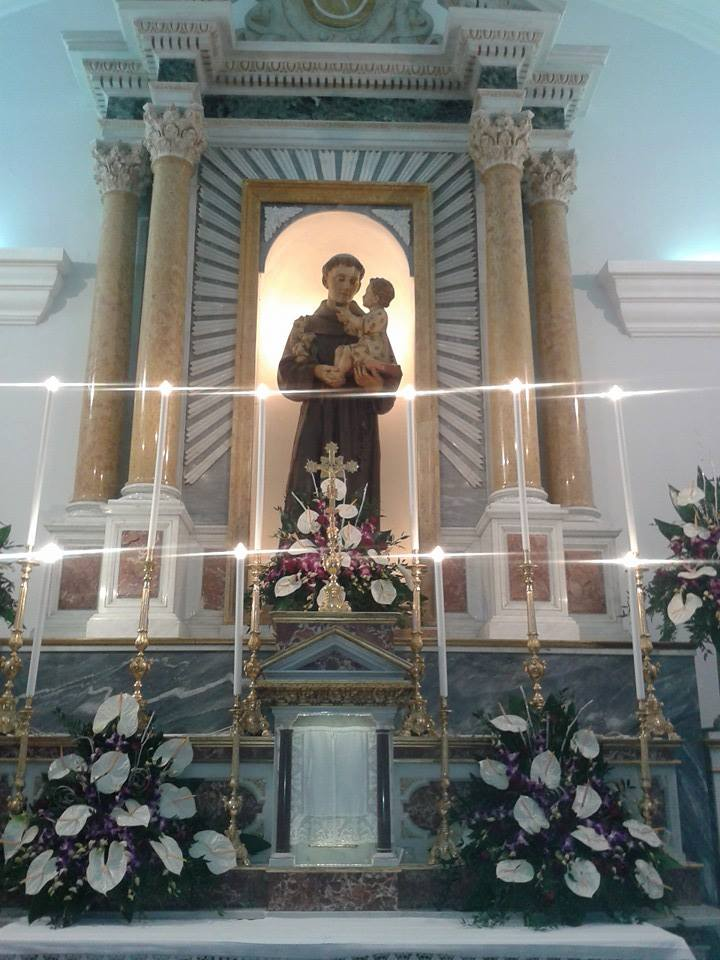
- altar
- Church of Sant'Antonio al Mortito
- 40°45′02″N 13°55′14″E
- Location: Casamicciola Terme; Island of Ischia; Province of Naples, Campania
- Country: Italy
- Denomination: Roman Catholic

History
- Status: Active
- Founded: 1692
- Dedication: Anthony of Padua

Architecture
- Designated: 1692
- Architectural type: Church
- Style: Italian Rationalism
- Completed: 1950

Administration
- Diocese: diocese of Ischia

Sant'Antonio al Mortito is an Italian Rationalism-style Catholic church in the town of Casamicciola Terme, on the island of Ischia in southern Italy. The church is located in the quarter of Perrone.

== History ==
The church was founded in 1692 by Cesare Corbera, who was the nephew of John Joseph of the Cross. Corbera obtained the right of patronage for himself and his successors from the Curia. Around 1850 the property passed to the Lombardi of Perrone family, who embellished and modernized the rural church. In 1883, after the earthquake of July 28, it served as a parish church for a year. A new church was consecrated in 1950.

The statue of the saint is a wooden statue from the 19th century donated to the parish by an Umbrian monastery. The new simulacrum replaced the ancient terracotta statuette of 1850, enlarged in 1950.

== See also ==
- Catholic Church in Italy

== Sources ==
- Iacono, Leonardo (1987). Chiesa di Sant'Antonio al Mortito, 300 anni di devozione popolare.
