= Restituta =

Roman Catholic and Eastern Orthodox Berber saint and martyr

Saint Restituta
- Born: ? Carthage or Bizerte (Tunisia)
- Died: AD 255 or 304; Tunisia
- Venerated in: Roman Catholic Church; Eastern Orthodox Church
- Feast: 17 May
- Patronage: Lacco Ameno

Restituta (Restituta of Africa; died in AD 255 or 304) is a Berber saint and martyr of the Roman Catholic and Eastern Orthodox churches. She was said to have been born in Carthage or Teniza (presently Ras Djebel, Tunisia) and martyred under Roman Emperor Diocletian. The location and date of her martyrdom are not precisely known. She sometimes is considered one of the Martyrs of Abitinae, Roman Province of Africa, a group of North Africans including Dativus, Saturninus, et alia, who were martyred in AD 304.

== Legend ==
A later medieval legend, recounted by Pietro Suddiacono in the 10th century and similar to legends associated with Devota, Reparata, and Torpes of Pisa, states that after being horribly tortured, Restituta was placed in a blazing boat loaded with oakum and resin. Restituta was unharmed by the fire, and asked for aid from God. God sent an angel to guide her boat to the island of Aenaria (present-day Ischia), and she landed at the present-day site of San Montano. The legend further states that a local Christian woman named Lucina had dreamt of the angel and the boat. When she walked to the beach, she found the resplendent and incorrupt body of Restituta, who was now dead. Lucina gathered the population together and Restituta was solemnly buried at the foot of Monte Vico in Lacco Ameno, where a paleochristian basilica was dedicated to her, and is now the site of a sanctuary dedicated to her.

== Veneration ==
However, the spread of her cult from North Africa to Italy is historically associated with the expulsion of Catholics from North Africa by Genseric, king of the Vandals, who followed the Arian sect. Her relics may have been brought to Naples in the fifth century by Gaudiosus of Naples when he was exiled from North Africa.

A church, Santa Restituta, was built in her honour in Naples in the sixth century.

The church was then incorporated into the Cathedral of Naples built on the same site in the 13th century.

She is the patroness saint of Lacco Ameno. She is especially venerated on the island of Ischia and at Lacco Ameno, where she is celebrated in a three-day celebration running from May 16 to May 18.

A crypt associated with Restituta can be found even in Sardinia at Cagliari, in the neighborhood of Stampace.

Lamartine, inspired by the legend of the saint, composed in 1842 “Le lis du golfe de Santa Restituta dans l’ìle d’Ischia.”

The largest city square in the Italian town of Sora, the Piazza di San Restituta, is named after the saint.

== See also ==
- Avigliano Umbro in Umbria has a frazione called Santa Restituta.
- Saint Restituta, patron saint archive
