= Lacco Ameno =

Lacco Ameno Lacco
- Comune
- Comune di Lacco Ameno
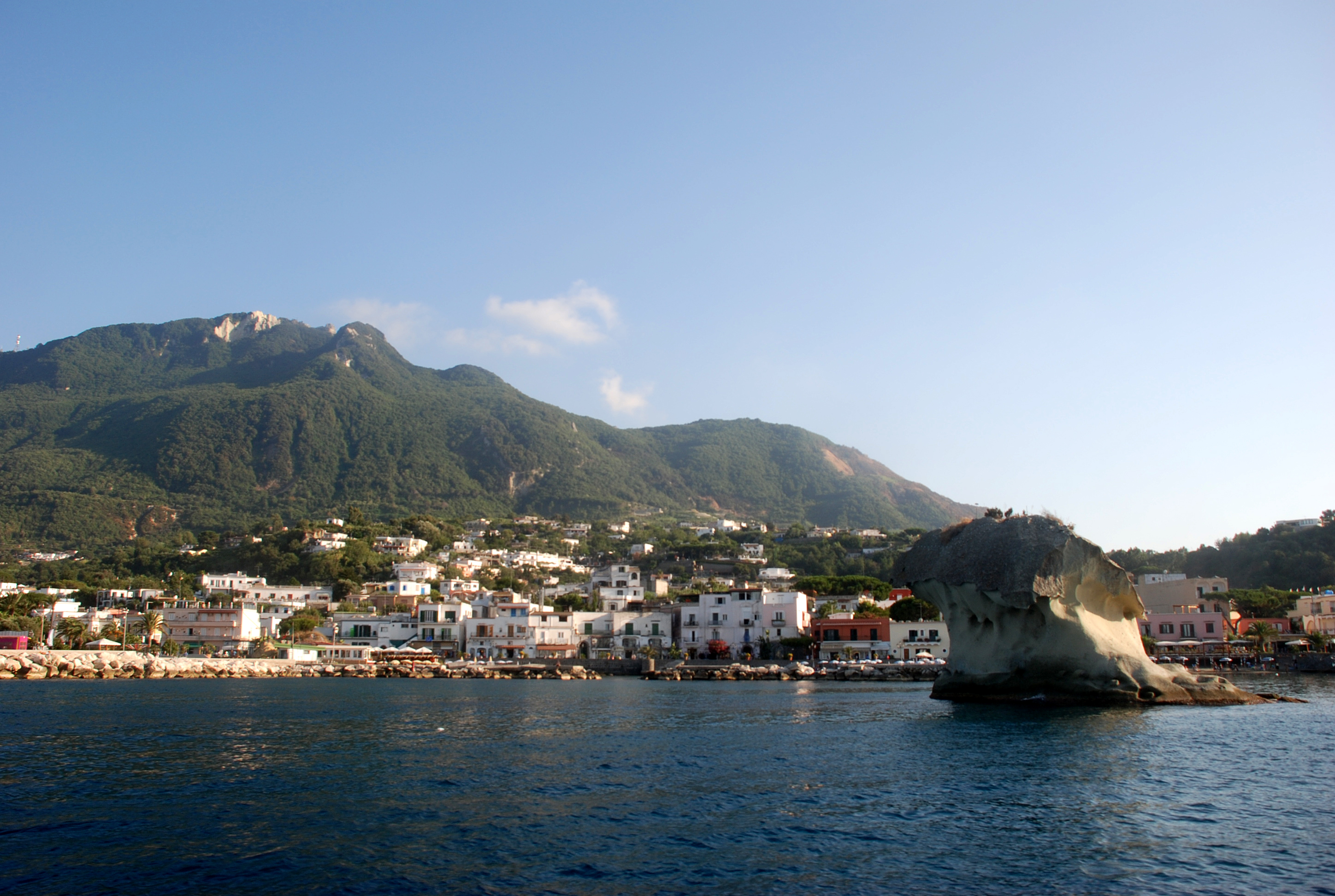
- View of Lacco Ameno

- Location within Italy Location within Campania
- Coordinates: 40°45′N 13°53′E
- Country: Italy
- Region: Campania
- Metropolitan city: Naples (NA)

Government
  - Mayor: Domenico De Siano

Area
  - Total: 2.08 km^{2} (0.80 sq mi)

Population (2026)
  - Total: 4,469
  - Density: 2,150/km^{2} (5,560/sq mi)
- Demonym: Lacchesi
- Time zone: UTC+1 (CET)
  - Summer (DST): UTC+2 (CEST)
- Postal code: 80076
- Dialing code: 081
- Patron saint: St. Restituta
- Saint day: May 17
- Website: Official website

Lacco Ameno is a town and comune (municipality) in the Metropolitan City of Naples in the region of Campania in southern Italy, situated on the island of Ischia. It has 4,469 inhabitants.

It is famous for its exclusive hotels, healing thermal waters, Mediterranean cuisine, and elegant shopping.

It is located at the foot of Mount Epomeo, facing the sea.

== History ==
The name most likely derives from the Greek lakkos, meaning "stone". The word Ameno was added to the official name in 1862.

On July 28, 1883, Lacco Ameno was severely damaged by an earthquake; together with the neighboring town of Casamicciola, the disaster claimed over 2,300 lives. A total of 269 houses—about 69% of all buildings—were completely destroyed, and only 18 structures remained undamaged.

However, this did not stop its transformation from a fishing village into a health resort famous for its thermal springs. The Italian publisher Angelo Rizzoli turned Lacco Ameno into a gathering place for the international jet set by building several five-star luxury hotels during the 1950s and 1960s, which remain today among the finest examples of the island’s hospitality. In 1962, he also funded Ischia’s only hospital, the Ospedale Anna Rizzoli.

From the 1950s and 1960s onward, Lacco Ameno became a favorite destination of the international elite. Among its many notable regular visitors were the Duke of Windsor, actors Clark Gable and Elizabeth Taylor, and the last Shah of Persia, Mohammad Reza Pahlavi. The town’s main industry is tourism, with a particular focus on the luxury sector. Alongside the hotels, a network of boutiques and jewelry shops developed, many of which can still be found today in the main square dedicated to the patron saint. The town’s first major infrastructure was the tourist harbor, which includes a renowned pier designed for docking mega-yachts.

On August 21, 2017, a magnitude 4 earthquake struck Lacco Ameno and Casamicciola Terme, killing two people, partially collapsing a church, and destroying several houses.

== Demographics ==
As of 2026, the population is 4,469, of which 49.0% are male, and 51.0% are female. Minors make up 14.4% of the population, and seniors make up 23.2%.

Historical population

Year	Pop.	±%
1861	1,545	—
1871	1,663	+7.6%
1881	1,761	+5.9%
1901	1,955	+11.0%
1911	1,890	−3.3%
1921	1,981	+4.8%
1931	1,879	−5.1%
1936	1,848	−1.6%

Year	Pop.	±%
1951	2,060	+11.5%
1961	2,513	+22.0%
1971	3,055	+21.6%
1981	3,523	+15.3%
1991	3,936	+11.7%
2001	4,273	+8.6%
2011	4,675	+9.4%
2021	4,642	−0.7%

Source: ISTAT

=== Immigration ===
As of 2025, immigrants make up 7.9% of the population. The 5 largest foreign countries of birth are the Dominican Republic, Ukraine, Romania, Senegal, and Germany.

== Main sights ==
Lacco Ameno is home to an 11th-century church, built over a pre-existing Palaeo-Christian edifice. The Museum of Santa Restituta houses several prehistorical findings and Greek ceramics from the 8th-2nd centuries BC.

There are many luxury hotels and boutiques frequented, especially in the summer months.

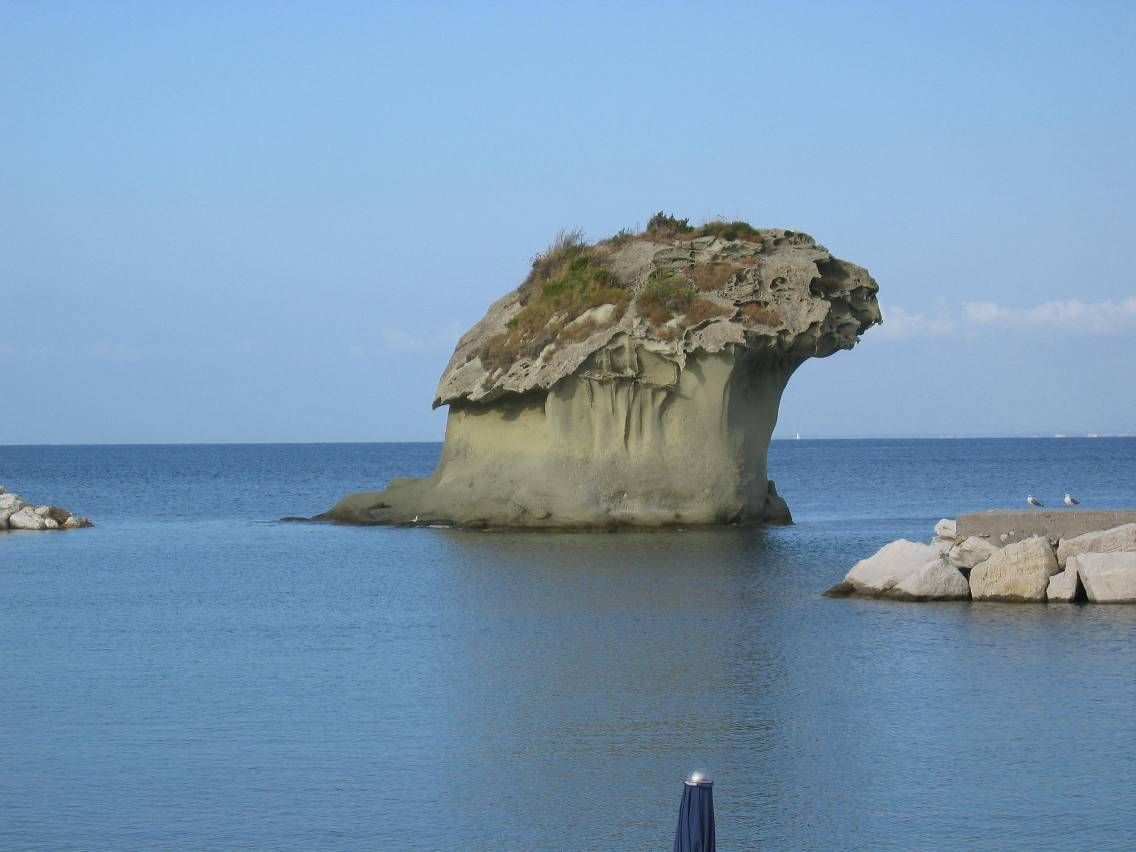
The Fungo ("Mushroom") sea rock.
