= 2017 Ischia earthquake =

Earthquake on the island of Ischia, Campania, Italy

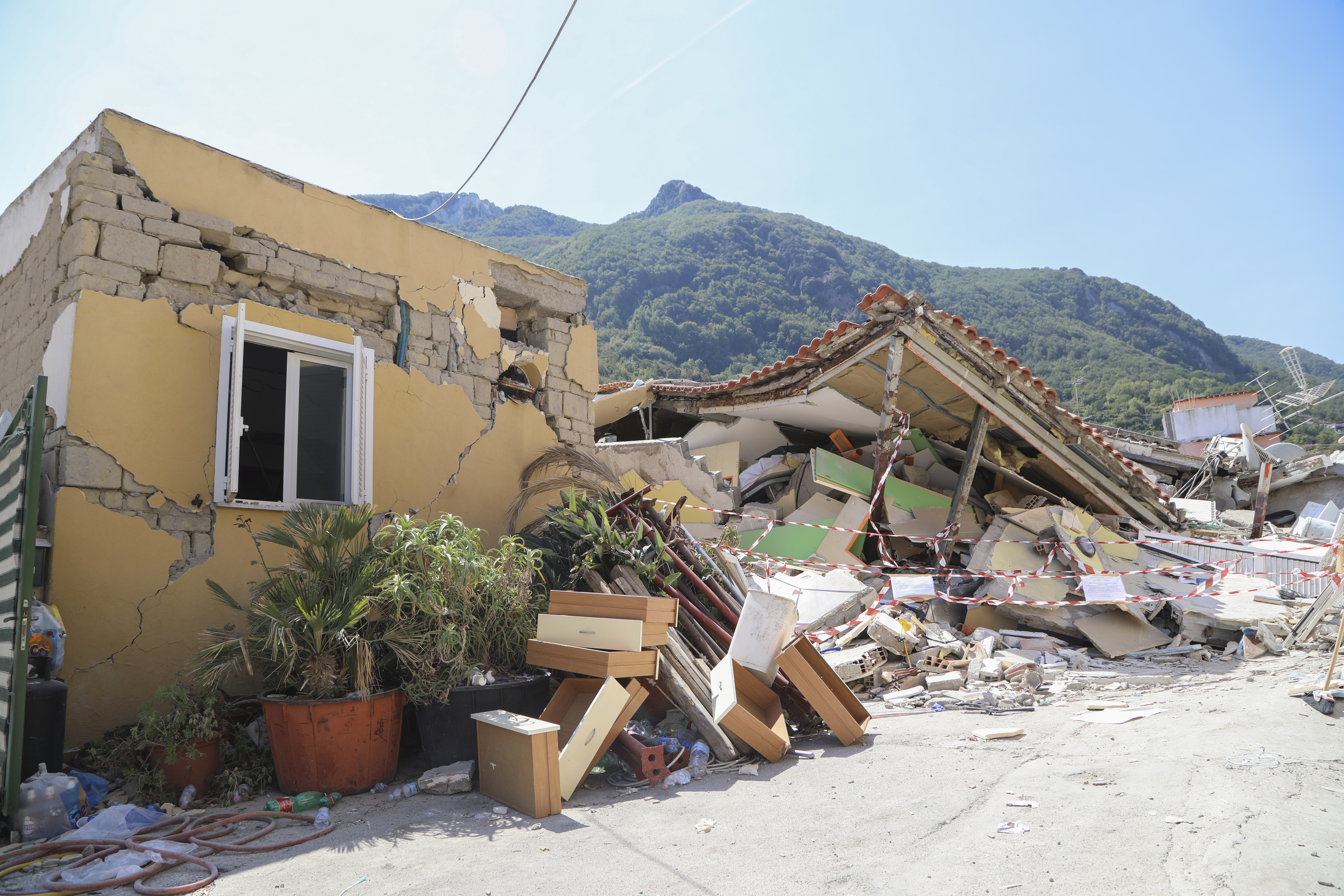
- Damage to buildings caused by the earthquake, photo taken on 26 August 2017

- Location within Campania Location within Italy
- UTC time: 2017-08-21 18:57:51
- ISC event: 611834681
- USGS-ANSS: ComCat
- Local date: 21 August 2017
- Local time: 20:57 CEST
- Magnitude: 3.9 M_{w} 4.2 mb
- Depth: 2.0 km (1.2 mi) (INGV) 2.7 km (1.7 mi)(USGS)
- Epicenter: 40°44′24″N 13°54′0″E
- Areas affected: Ischia, Campania
- Max. intensity: EMS-98 VIII (Heavily damaging) MMI VIII (Severe)
- Casualties: 2 deaths 42 injured 2,600 homeless

The 2017 Ischia earthquake occurred in the island of Ischia, Campania, in southern Italy. The main shock occurred at 20:57 CEST (18:57 UTC) on 21 August 2017, and was rated 3.9 M_{w} or 4.2 mb on the moment magnitude scale.

Despite the moderate magnitude, several buildings and a church collapsed. One woman died in Casamicciola Terme after being hit by rubble that fell from a church. Another woman died when her house collapsed.

== Damage and debates ==
The collapse of several buildings and the death of two women created much controversy and debate in Italy, because many geologists stated that with a moderate magnitude quake, modern buildings should not collapse.

Moreover, Ischia is a zone with a high number of irregular buildings, and many critics considered the poor construction materials as the main cause for the death of the two women and for the damage.

The sharp increase of the population between 1950s and 1980s and the growing inflow of tourists increased the anthropic pressure on the island. Significant acreage of land previously used for agriculture has been developed for the construction of houses or residential buildings. Most of this development took place without any planning and building permits. Many houses and structures across the island sustained moderate to severe damage when the earthquake hit.

== See also ==
- List of earthquakes in 2017
- List of earthquakes in Italy
- 1883 Casamicciola earthquake
