= Castello d'Ischia Lighthouse =

Castello d'Ischia lighthouse
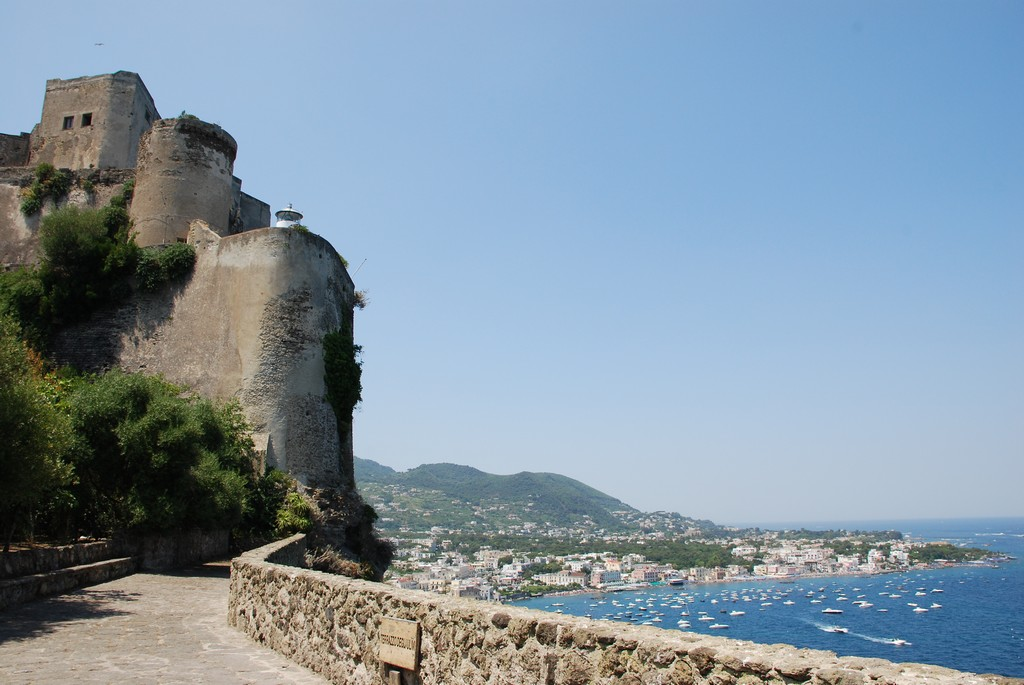
- Location: Ischia; Campania; Italy
- Coordinates: 40°43′56″N 13°57′56″E

Tower
- Constructed: 1913
- Foundation: stone wall
- Construction: stone bastion
- Automated: yes
- Height: 3 metres (9.8 ft)
- Markings: grey metallic lantern
- Operator: Marina Militare

Light
- Focal height: 82 metres (269 ft)
- Lens: Type TD
- Intensity: AL 1000 W
- Range: main: 16 nautical miles (30 km; 18 mi) reserve: 12 nautical miles (22 km; 14 mi)
- Characteristic: L Fl W 6s.
- Italy no.: 2370 E.F.

Castello d'Ischia Lighthouse (Italian: Faro di Castello d'Ischia) is an active lighthouse located in the municipality of Ischia, Campania on the Tyrrhenian Sea.

== Description ==
The lighthouse was established in 1913 and consist of a lantern mounted on a steep bastion, toward the seaside, of the Aragonese Castle built in the 15th century. The lantern, 3 feet (0.91 m) high, is positioned at 82 metres (269 ft) above sea level and emits a long white flash in a 6 seconds period, visible up to a distance of 16 nautical miles (30 km; 18 mi). The lighthouse is completely automated and is operated by the Marina Militare with the identification code number 2370 E.F.

== See also ==
- List of lighthouses in Italy
- Ischia
