= Casamicciola Terme =

- Comune
- Comune di Casamicciola Terme
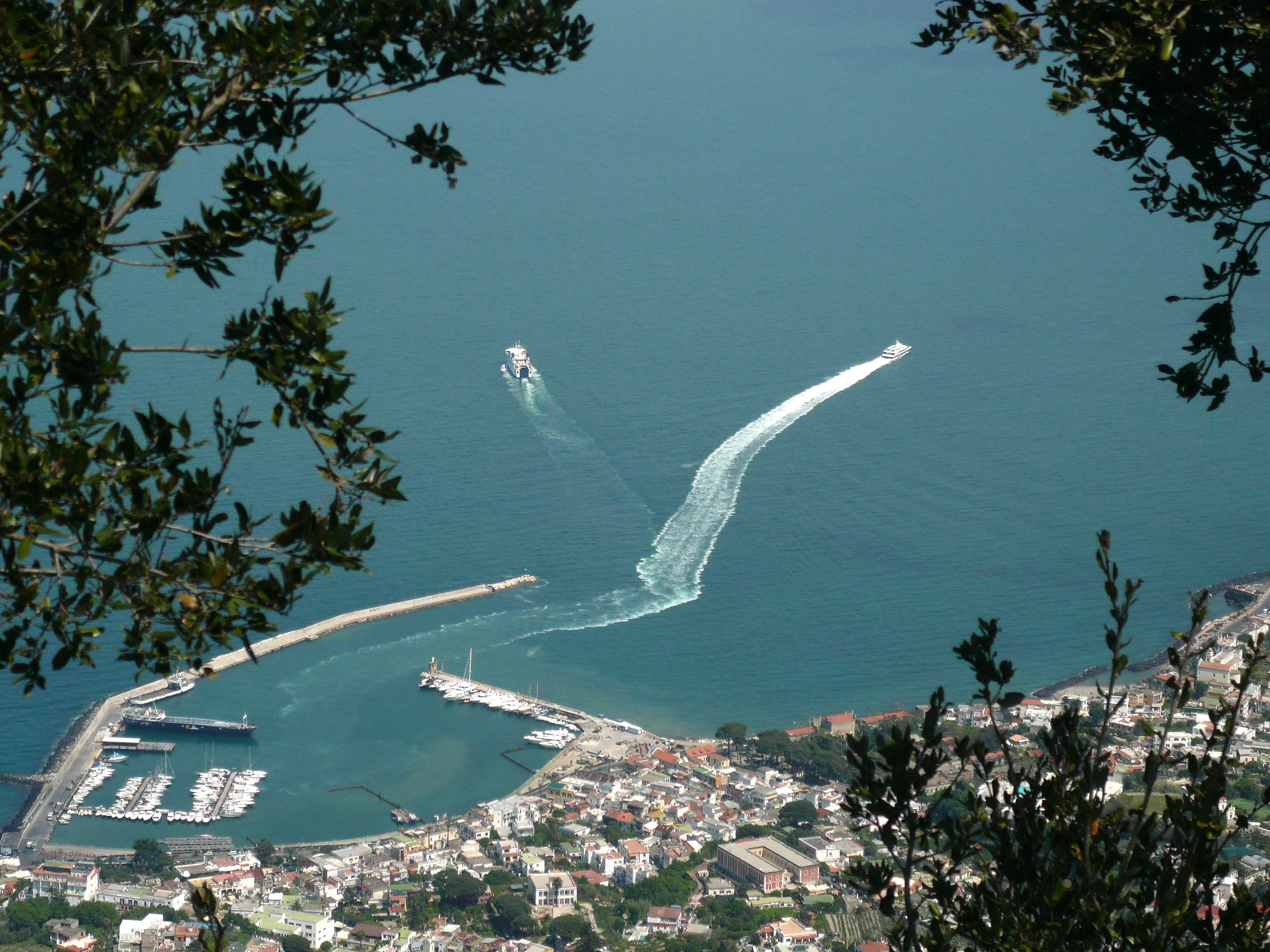
- View of the port of Casamicciola Terme

- Coat of arms

- Location within Italy Location within Campania
- Coordinates: 40°45′N 13°55′E
- Country: Italy
- Region: Campania
- Metropolitan city: Naples (NA)

Government
  - Mayor: Giovan Battista Castagna

Area
  - Total: 5.85 km^{2} (2.26 sq mi)

Population (2026)
  - Total: 7,361
  - Density: 1,260/km^{2} (3,260/sq mi)
- Demonym: Casamicciolesi
- Time zone: UTC+1 (CET)
  - Summer (DST): UTC+2 (CEST)
- Postal code: 80074
- Dialing code: 081
- Patron saint: St. Mary Magdalene
- Saint day: 22 July
- Website: Official website

Casamicciola Terme is a town and comune (municipality) in the Metropolitan City of Naples in the region of Campania in southern Italy, located in the northern part of the island of Ischia. It has 7,361 inhabitants.

Casamicciola Terme borders the municipalities of Barano d'Ischia, Forio, Ischia, Lacco Ameno, and Serrara Fontana.

== History ==
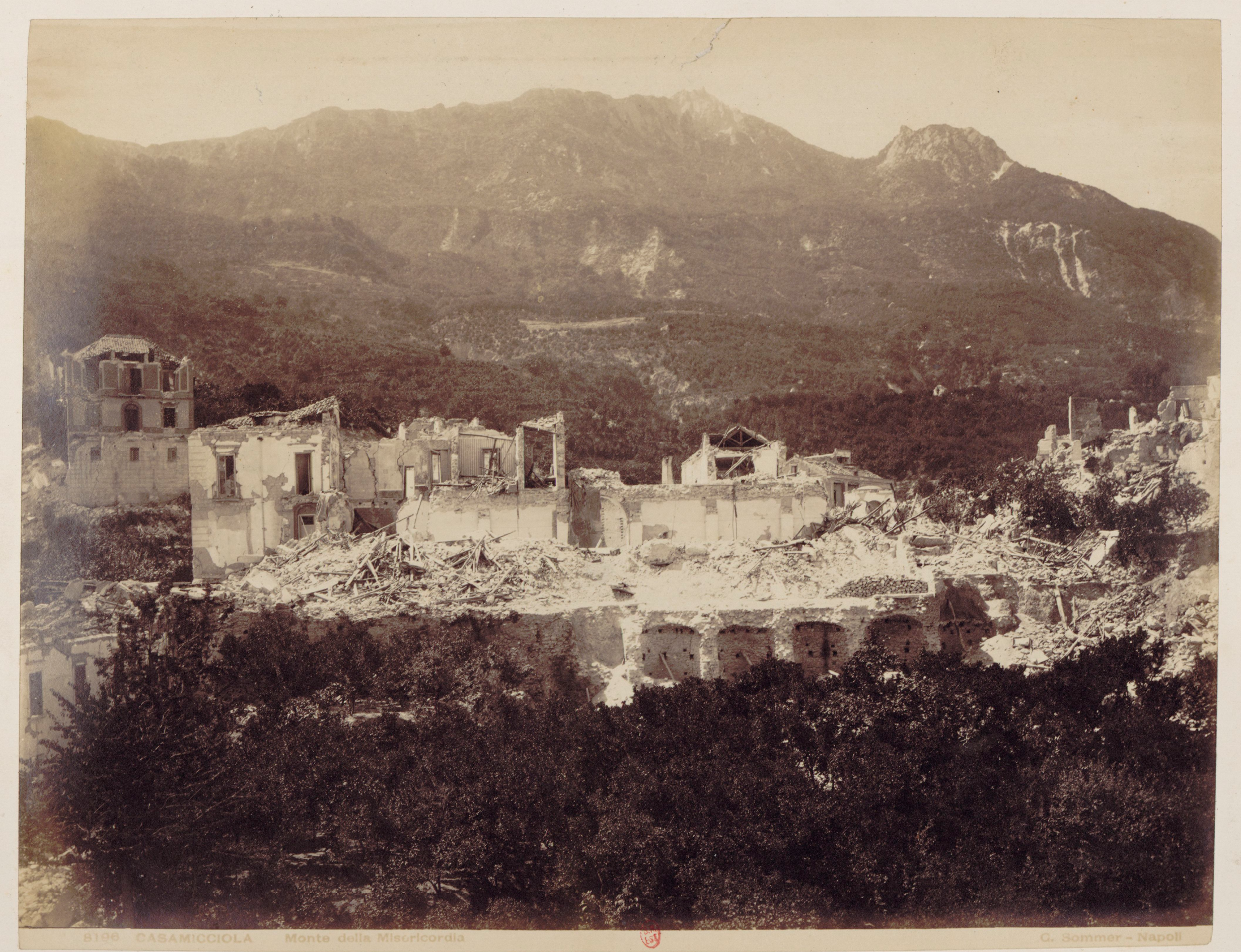
The 1883 earthquake inflicted heavy damage in Casamicciola

In 1883, an earthquake struck the northern part of Ischia. Despite the moderate magnitude of 4.2–5.5, many buildings in the across the island were totally destroyed. The city was heavily damaged—many homes and businesses were demolished. At least 2,313 people were killed—1,784 people died in the city alone.

On 21 August 2017 was hit by a 4.3 magnitude earthquake, killing two people wounding 42 more, and causing damage to some houses. On 26 November 2022 strong rainfall led to a landslide killing of 12 lives and left over 200 people homeless. The severe landslide caused the destruction or damage of numerous buildings in Casamicciola.

== Demographics ==
As of 2026, the population is 7,361, of which 48.9% are male, and 51.1% are female. Minors make up 14.0% of the population, and seniors make up 24.0%.

Historical population

Year	Pop.	±%
1861	3,741	—
1871	4,103	+9.7%
1881	4,217	+2.8%
1901	3,731	−11.5%
1911	3,490	−6.5%
1921	3,731	+6.9%
1931	3,959	+6.1%
1936	4,086	+3.2%

Year	Pop.	±%
1951	4,469	+9.4%
1961	4,983	+11.5%
1971	5,399	+8.3%
1981	5,945	+10.1%
1991	6,505	+9.4%
2001	7,374	+13.4%
2011	8,080	+9.6%
2021	7,715	−4.5%

Source: ISTAT

=== Immigration ===
As of 2025, immigrants make up 7.0% of the population. The 5 largest foreign countries of birth are Ukraine, the Dominican Republic, Germany, Romania, and Tunisia.

== Main sights ==
- Church of Sant'Antonio al Mortito

== Notable people ==
- The Swiss-born physician Jacques Etienne Chevalley de Rivaz who had a famous sanatorium in Casamicciola and lived there from 1830 until his death in 1863. He was made an honorary citizen of Casamicciola in 1837 for his work in halting a cholera outbreak in nearby Forio.
