= Barano d'Ischia =

Barano d'Ischia Varàno (Neapolitan)
- Comune
- Comune di Barano d'Ischia
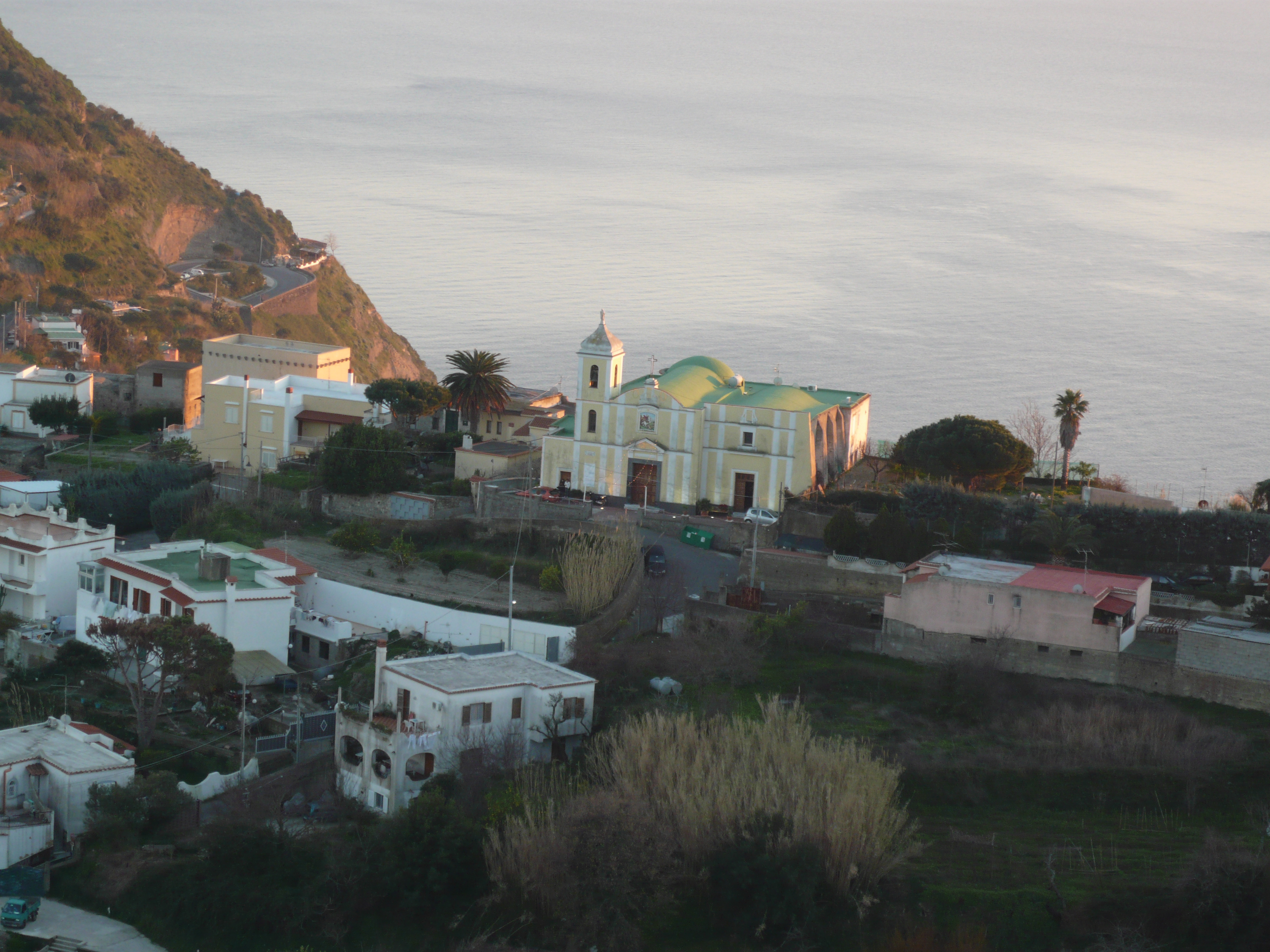
- View of the Church of San Giorgio a Testaccio

- Location within Italy Location within Campania
- Coordinates: 40°43′N 13°55′E
- Country: Italy
- Region: Campania
- Metropolitan city: Naples (NA)

Government
  - Mayor: Paolino Buono

Area
  - Total: 10.96 km^{2} (4.23 sq mi)

Population (2026)
  - Total: 9,953
  - Density: 908.1/km^{2} (2,352/sq mi)
- Demonym: Baranesi
- Time zone: UTC+1 (CET)
  - Summer (DST): UTC+2 (CEST)
- Postal code: 80070 and 80077
- Dialing code: 081
- Patron saint: St. Rochus
- Saint day: 16 August
- Website: Official website

Barano d'Ischia (Neapolitan: Varàno) is a town and comune (municipality) in the Metropolitan City of Naples in the region of Campania in southern Italy, located in the south-west area of the island of Ischia, about 30 kilometres (19 mi) southwest of Naples. It has 9,953 inhabitants.

It is after Forio the largest municipality in size of the island, although not one of the most populated. Its territory is composed by several villages: Buonopane, Piedimonte, Fiaiano, Testaccio (none of these villages have become a frazione); Testaccio was formerly an independent municipality.

Barano d'Ischia borders the municipalities of Casamicciola Terme, Ischia, and Serrara Fontana.

== History ==
The area was first settled by the Greeks, who had a nymphaeum here.

== Demographics ==
As of 2026, the population is 9,953, of which 49.5% are male, and 50.5% are female. Minors make up 15.7% of the population, and seniors make up 22.8%.

Historical population

Year	Pop.	±%
1861	4,142	—
1871	4,412	+6.5%
1881	4,598	+4.2%
1901	5,392	+17.3%
1911	6,285	+16.6%
1921	7,143	+13.7%
1931	7,128	−0.2%
1936	6,525	−8.5%

Year	Pop.	±%
1951	6,003	−8.0%
1961	5,769	−3.9%
1971	5,826	+1.0%
1981	6,346	+8.9%
1991	7,738	+21.9%
2001	8,591	+11.0%
2011	9,882	+15.0%
2021	9,975	+0.9%

Source: ISTAT

=== Immigration ===
As of 2025, immigrants make up 8.7% of the population. The 5 largest foreign countries of birth are Ukraine, Argentina, the Dominican Republic, the United States, and Germany.

== Main sights ==
- The Pilastri aqueduct (1470)
- Church of St. John the Baptist (15th century), one of the most ancient in the island. It houses a canvas by a Caravaggist.
- Saracen Tower, in the village of Testaccio
- Windmills in Montebarano
