= Mount Epomeo =

Mountain on the volcanic island of Ischia

Coordinates: 40.73°N 13.895°E

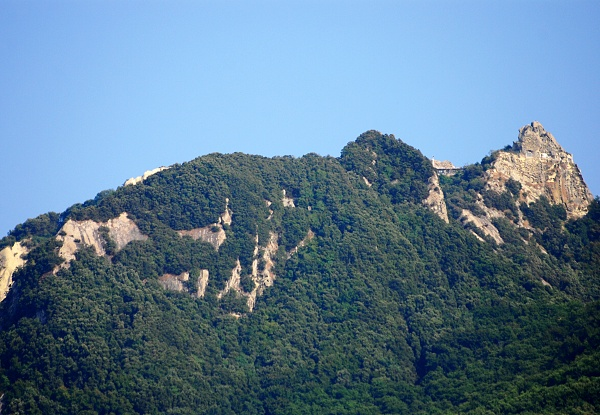

Highest point
- Elevation: 789 m (2,589 ft)
- Prominence: 787 m (2,582 ft)

Geography
- Location: Ischia, Italy

Climbing
- Easiest route: Hike

Mount Epomeo (Italian: Monte Epomeo) is the highest mountain on the volcanic island of Ischia, in the Gulf of Naples, Italy. Epomeo is believed to be a volcanic horst.

Reaching a height of 789 metres (2,589 ft), it towers above the rest of Ischia. Much of Epomeo is covered in lush greenery, with a few vineyards also occupying its slopes and its cliffs. Approximately 75 metres (246 ft) from the peak; the mountain is covered in white lava.

A path leads to the summit of the mountain from Fontana, one of its quiet traditional villages.
