= Ischia =

Volcanic island in the Tyrrhenian Sea

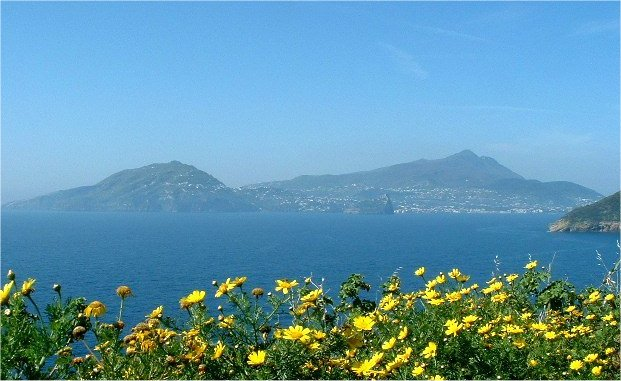
- View of Ischia from Procida

Highest point
- Elevation: 789 m (2,589 ft)
- Coordinates: 40°43′52″N 13°53′45″E

Geography
- Location within Campania Location within Italy
- Location: Metropolitan City of Naples, Italy

Geology
- Mountain type: Complex volcano
- Last eruption: January to March 1302

Ischia
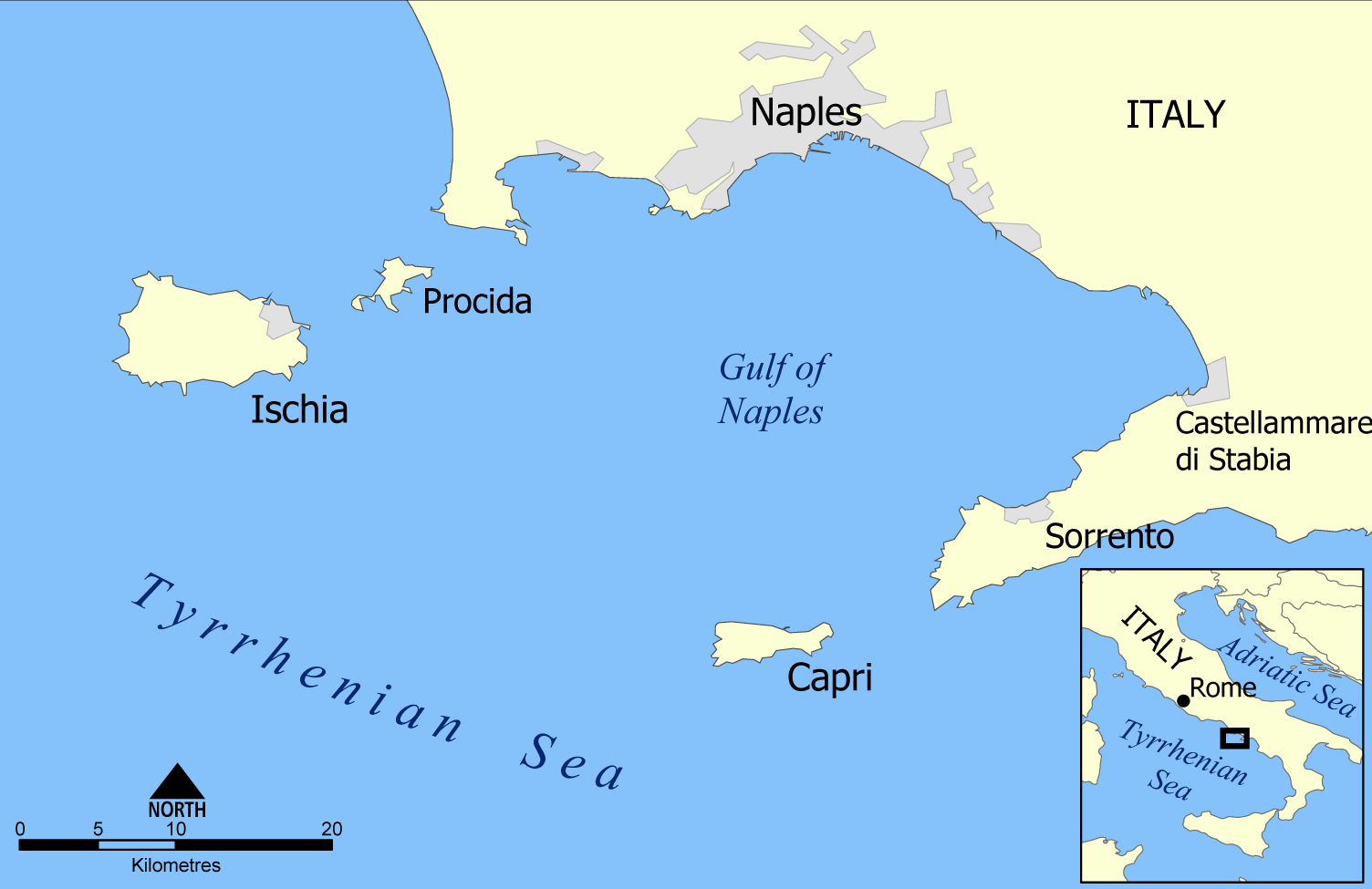

Geography
- Location: Tyrrhenian Sea
- Area: 46.55 km^{2} (17.97 sq mi)
- Highest elevation: 789 m (2589 ft)
- Highest point: Mount Epomeo

Administration
- Italy
- Region: Campania
- Metropolitan City: Naples
- Largest settlement: Ischia (pop. 19,415)

Demographics
- Population: 61,727 (2026)
- Pop. density: 1,326.0/km^{2} (3434.3/sq mi)

Ischia (/ˈɪskiə/ ISK-ee-ə, Italian: [ˈiskja], Neapolitan: [ˈiʃkjə]) is a volcanic island in the Tyrrhenian Sea. It lies at the northern end of the Gulf of Naples, about 30 kilometres (19 miles) from the city of Naples. It is the largest of the Phlegrean Islands. Although inhabited since the Bronze Age, as a Greek emporium it was founded in the 8th or 9th century BCE, and known as Πιθηκοῦσαι, Pithekoūsai.

Roughly trapezoidal in shape, it measures approximately 10 km (6 miles) east to west and 7 km (4 miles) north to south and has about 34 km (21 miles) of coastline and a surface area of 47 square kilometres (18.1 sq mi). It is almost entirely mountainous; the highest peak is Mount Epomeo, at 788 metres (2,585 feet).

Ischia is also the name of the main municipality of the island. The other municipalities of the island are Barano d'Ischia, Casamicciola Terme, Forio, Lacco Ameno and Serrara Fontana. The island is very densely populated, with 61,727 residents as of 2026, corresponding to a population density of 1,326 inhabitants per squared kilometre.

== Name ==
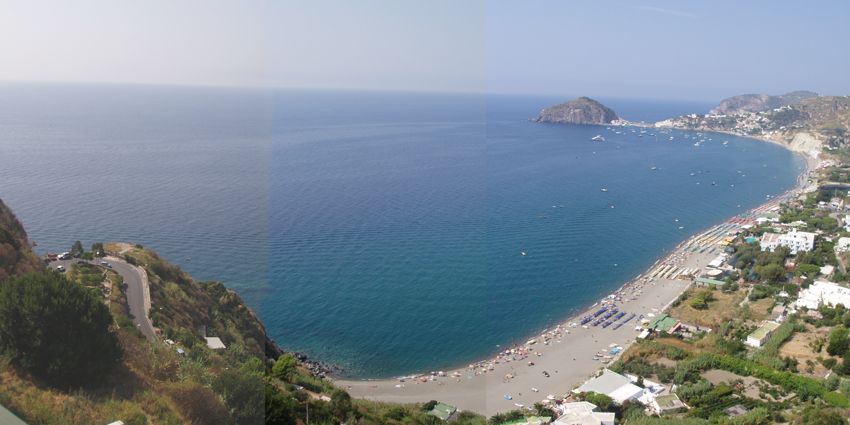
Maronti beach, east of the spit of St. Angelo

The Greeks called their colony on the island Pithekoussai (Πιθηκοῦσσαι), from which the Latin name Pithecusa was derived. The name has an uncertain etymology. According to Ovid and the Alexandrian historian Xenagoras, the name could derive from pithekos, monkey, and refer to the myth of the Cercopes, inhabitants of the Phlegraean islands transformed by Zeus into monkeys. More plausible is the interpretation of Pliny the Elder, who instead derives the name from the word πιθός (amphora), a theory supported by archaeological finds which testify to the Greek-Italic production of ceramics (and in particular of wine amphorae) on the island and in the Gulf of Naples.

It has also been proposed that the name describes a characteristic of the island, rich in pine forests. "πιτυόεις" (rich in pines), "πίτυις" (pine cone), and "πίσσα, πίττα" (resin) appear as descriptive terms from which Pithekoussai could derive. The name, therefore, could mean "island of resin," which was an important substance used, among other things, to waterproof wine vessels. The name Aenaria, also used by the Latins, is linked to metallurgical workshops (from aenus, metal) located on the eastern coast, under the castle.

The first evidence of the island's current toponym dates back to the year 812, in a letter from Pope Leo III in which he informs Emperor Charlemagne of devastations that occurred in the area, calling the island Iscla maior: "Ingressi sunt ipsi nefandissimi Mauri [...] in insulam, quae dicitur Iscla maiore, non longe a Neapolitana urbe." Some scholars connect the term to the Phoenician word, and therefore Semitic i-schra, meaning "black island." The Phoenician presence on the island is archaeologically documented from a very ancient era and, as reported by Moscati (an Italian historian), in the spread in Campania and southern Etruria, since the 8th century BC, of objects of Egyptian production or inspiration, "the Phoenician merchants settled in Ischia and then frequented the Tyrrhenian coasts" certainly played a part.

On the other hand, the modern "Island of Ischia" could derive from the Latin "insula visca" – compare the Greek noun (ϝ)ἰξός, (w)ixós, (mistletoe) and the adjective (ϝ)ἰξώδης, (w)ixṓdēs, (viscous, sticky), which as usual have lost the initial digamma. In favor of this theory could be the fact that in the same area, at the foot of Vesuvius covered with pines, the popular name of Herculaneum was "Resìna," perhaps reminiscent of an ancient market for this product, similarly to the toponym "Pizzo" in Calabria, from where the best resin, the "pece brettia" obtained from the pines of the nearby Sila, came from.

Virgil poetically referred to it as Inarime. This name may derive from the land of Ἀρίμη, which was referenced in the Iliad as the land where Typhon was buried. Martianus Capella followed Virgil in this allusive name, which was never in common circulation: the Romans called it Aenaria, the Greeks, Πιθηκοῦσαι, Pithekoūsai.

(In)arime and Pithekousai both appear to derive from words for "monkey" (Etruscan arimos, Ancient Greek πίθηκος, píthēkos, "monkey"). However, Pliny derives the Greek name from the local clay deposits, not from píthēkos; he explains the Latin name Aenaria as connected to a landing by Aeneas. If the island actually was, like Gibraltar, home to a population of monkeys, they were already extinct by historical times as no record of them is mentioned in ancient sources.

== History ==
=== Ancient times ===
An acropolis site of the Monte Vico area was inhabited from the Bronze Age, as Mycenaean and Iron Age pottery findings attest. Euboean Greeks from Eretria and Chalcis arrived in the 8th century BC to establish an emporium for trade with the Etruscans of the mainland. This settlement was home to a mixed population of Greeks, Etruscans, and Phoenicians. Because of its fine harbor and the safety from raids afforded by the sea, the settlement of Pithecusae became successful through trade in iron and with mainland Italy; in 700 BC Pithecusae was home to 5,000–10,000 people.

The ceramic Euboean artifact inscribed with a reference to "Nestor's Cup" was discovered in a grave on the island in 1953. Engraved upon the cup are a few lines written in the Greek alphabet. Dating from c. 730 BC, it is one of the most important testimonies to the early Greek alphabet, from which the Latin alphabet descended via the Etruscan alphabet. According to certain scholars the inscription also might be the oldest written reference to the Iliad.

In 474 BC, Hiero I of Syracuse came to the aid of the Cumaeans, who lived on the mainland opposite Ischia, against the Etruscans and defeated them on the sea. He occupied Ischia and the surrounding Parthenopean islands and left behind a garrison to build a fortress before the city of Ischia itself. This was still extant in the Middle Ages, but the original garrison fled before the eruptions of 470 BC and the island was taken over by Neapolitans. The Romans seized Ischia (and Naples) in 322 BC.

=== From 1st century AD to 16th century ===
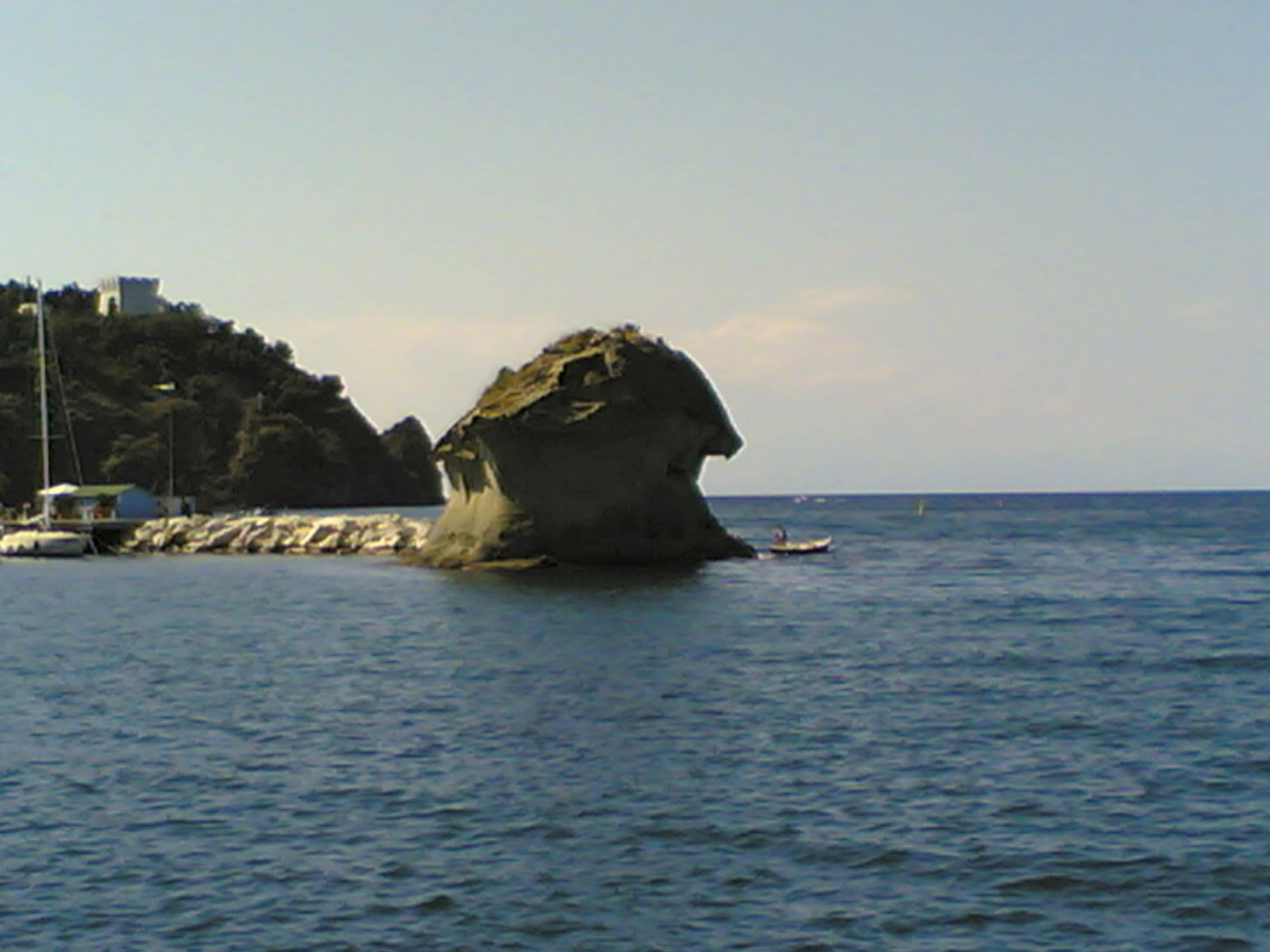
Local view of Il Fungo (The Mushroom)

In 6 AD, Augustus restored the island to Naples in exchange for Capri. Ischia suffered from the barbarian invasions, being taken first by the Heruli then by the Ostrogoths, being ultimately absorbed into the Eastern Roman Empire. The Byzantines gave the island over to Naples in 588 and by 661 it was being administered by a Count liege to the Duke of Naples. The area was devastated by the Saracens in 813 and 847; in 1004 it was occupied by Henry II of Germany; the Norman Roger II of Sicily took it in 1130 granting the island to the Norman Aldoyn de Candida created Count d'Ischia; the island was raided by the Pisans in 1135 and 1137 and subsequently fell under the Hohenstaufen and then Angevin rule. After the Sicilian Vespers in 1282, the island rebelled, recognizing Peter III of Aragon, but was retaken by the Angevins the following year. It was conquered in 1284 by the forces of Aragon and Charles II of Anjou was unable to successfully retake it until 1299.

As a consequence of the island's last eruption in 1302, the population fled to Baia where they remained for 4 years. In 1320 Robert of Anjou and his wife Sancia visited the island and were hosted by Cesare Sterlich, who had been sent by Charles II from the Holy See to govern the island in 1306 and was by this time nearly 100 years of age.

Ischia suffered greatly in the struggles between the Angevin and Durazzo dynasties. It was taken by Charles III of Naples in 1382, retaken by Louis II of Anjou in 1385 and captured yet again by Ladislaus of Naples in 1386; it was sacked by the fleet of the Antipope John XXIII under the command of Gaspare Cossa in 1410 only to be retaken by Ladislaus the following year. In 1422 Joan II gave the island to her adoptive son Alfonso V of Aragon, though, when he fell into disgrace, she retook it with the help of Genoa in 1424. In 1438 Alfonso reoccupied the castle, kicking out all the men and proclaiming it an Aragonese colony, marrying to his garrison the wives and daughters of the expelled. He set about building a bridge linking the castle to the rest of the island and he carved out a large gallery, both of which are still to be seen today. In 1442, he gave the island to one of his favorites, Lucretia d'Alagno, who in turn entrusted the island's governance to her brother-in-law, Giovanni Torella. Upon the death of Alfonso in 1458, they returned the island to the Angevin side. Ferdinand I of Naples ordered Alessandro Sforza to chase Torella out of the castle and gave the island over, in 1462, to Garceraldo Requesens. In 1464, after a brief Torellan insurrection, Marino Caracciolo was set up as governor.

In February 1495, with the arrival of Charles VIII, Ferdinand II landed on the island and took possession of the castle, and, after having killed the disloyal castellan Giusto di Candida with his own hands, left the island under the control of Innico d'Avalos, marquis of Pescara and Vasto, who ably defended the place from the French flotilla. With him came his sister Costanza and through them they founded the D'Avalos dynasty which would last on the island into the 18th century.

=== 16th–18th centuries ===
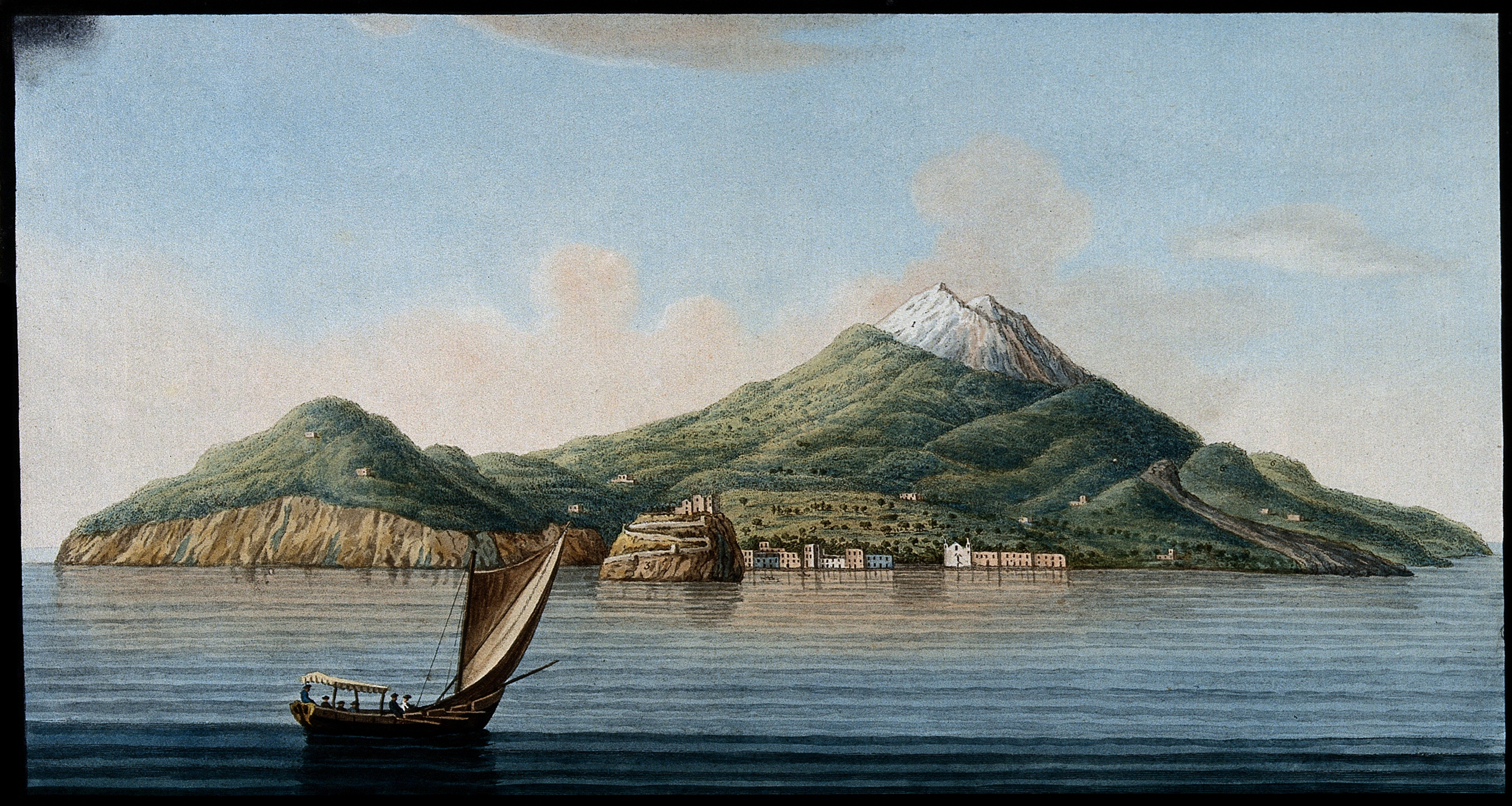
Ischia seen from the sea, 1776

Throughout the 16th century, the island suffered the incursions of pirates and Barbary privateers from North Africa: in 1543 and 1544 Hayreddin Barbarossa laid waste to the island, taking 4,000 prisoners in the process. In 1548 and 1552, Ischia was beset by his successor Dragut Rais. With the increasing rarity and diminishing severity of the piratical attacks later in the century and the construction of better defences, the islanders began to venture out of the castle and it was then that the historic centre of the town of Ischia was begun. Even so, many inhabitants still ended up slaves to the pirates, the last known being taken in 1796. During the 1647 revolution of Masaniello, there was an attempted rebellion against the feudal landowners.

=== Since the 18th century ===
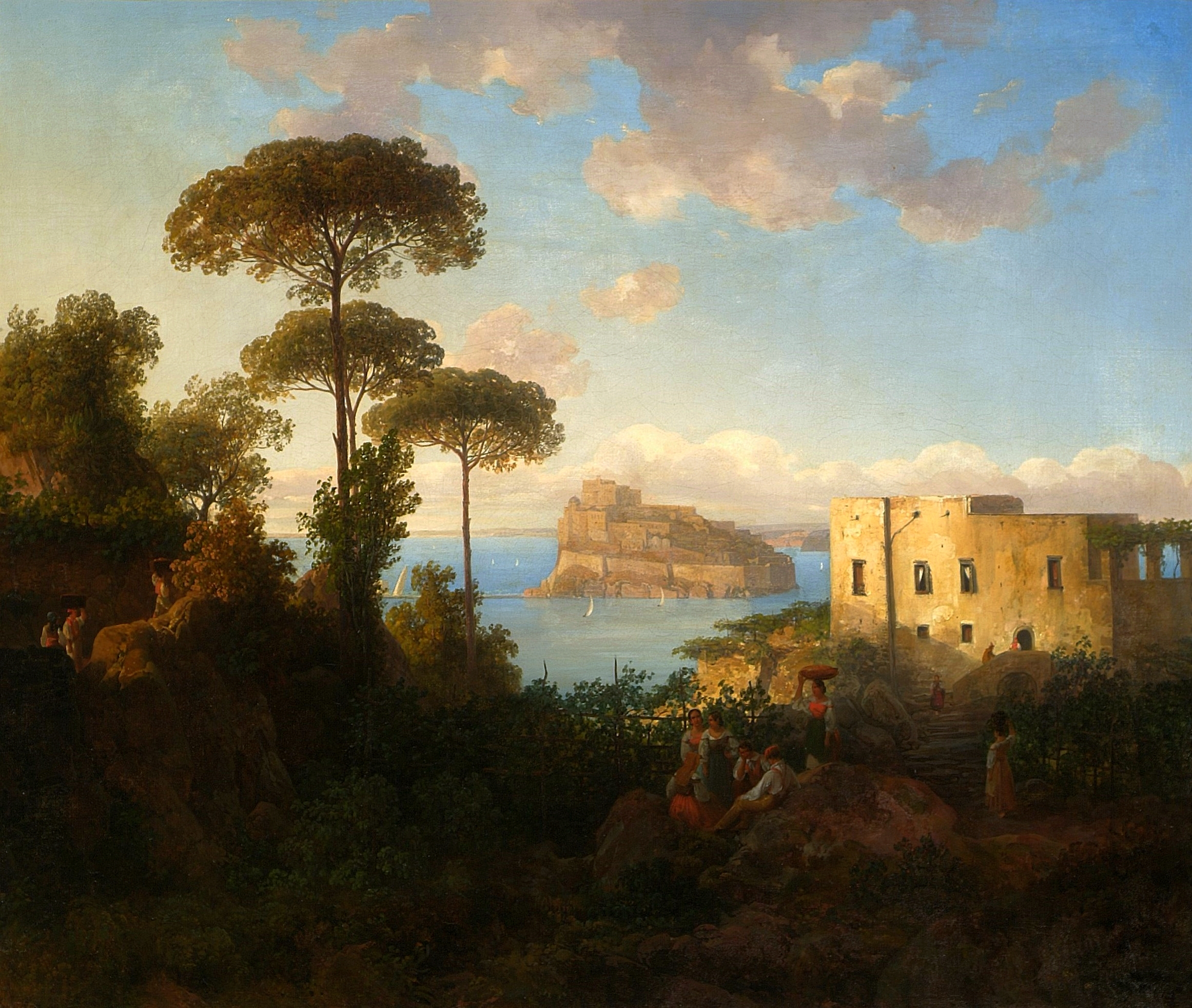
Thomas Ender, Ischian landscape (1832), National Museum, Warsaw

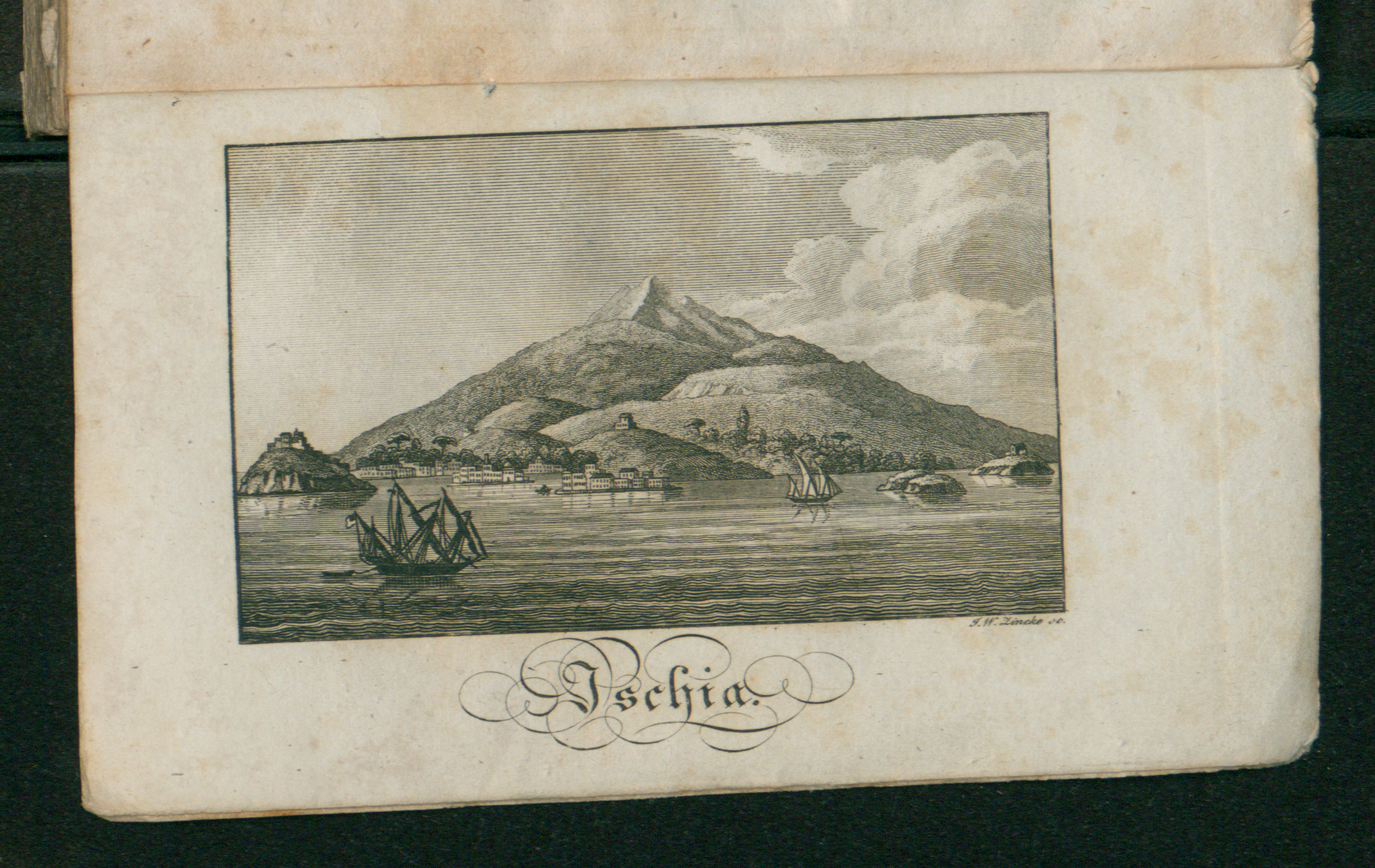
Tableau topographiques et historiques des isles d'Ischia, de Ponza, de Vandotena (1825)

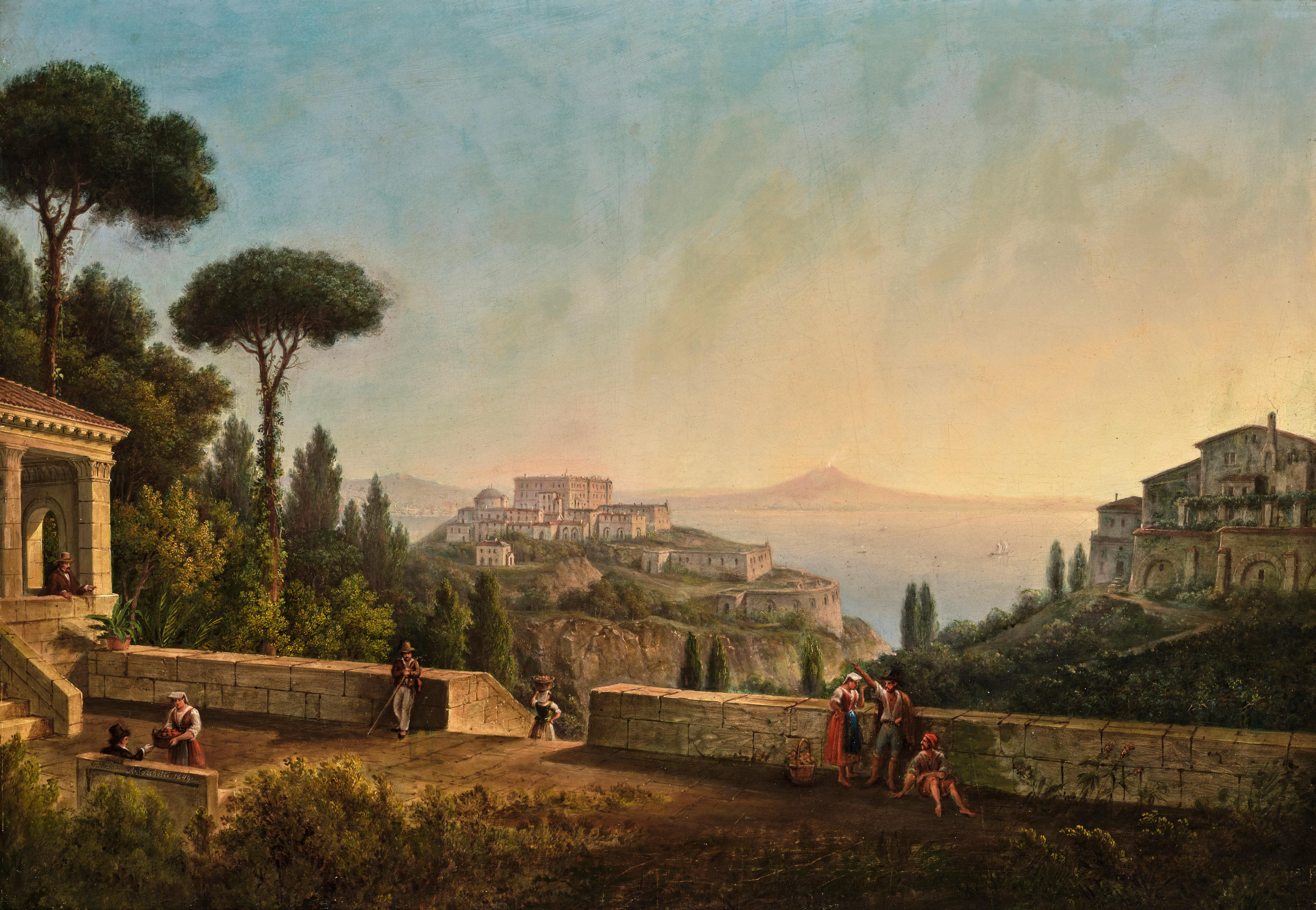
View of Vesuvius from Ischia, 1849

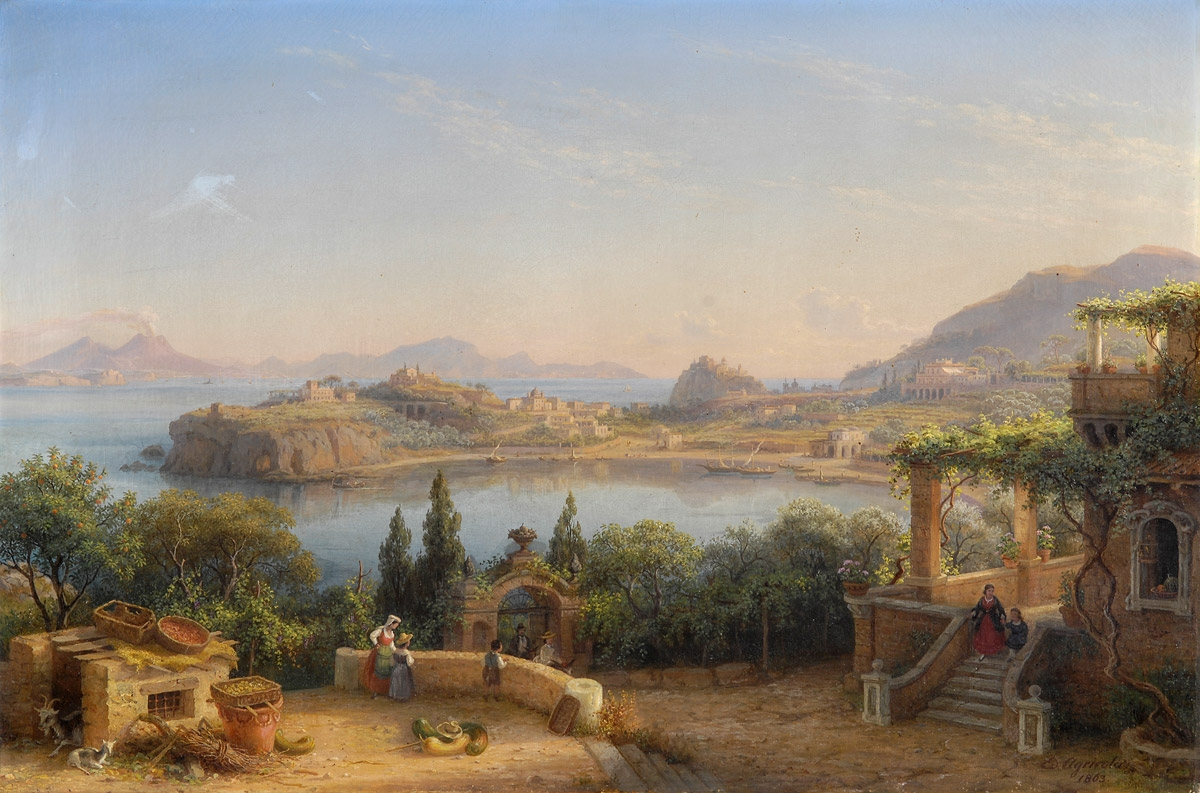
Port of Ischia, 1863

With the extinction of the D'Avalos line in 1729, the island reverted to state property. In March 1734 it was taken by the Bourbons and administered by a royal governor seated within the castle. The island participated in the short-lived Republic of Naples starting in March 1799 but by April 3 Commodore Thomas Troubridge under the command of Lord Nelson had put down the revolt on Ischia as well as on neighboring Procida. By decree of the governor, many of the rebels were hanged in a square on Procida now called Piazza dei martiri (Square of the Martyrs). Among these was Francesco Buonocore who had received the island to administer from the French Championnet in Naples. On February 13, 1806, the island was occupied by the French and on the 24th was unsuccessfully attacked by the British.

On June 21 and 22, 1809 the islands of Ischia and Procida were attacked by an Anglo-Bourbon fleet. Procida surrendered on June 24 and Ischia soon afterwards. However the British soon returned to their bases in Sicily and Malta. In the 19th century Ischia was a popular travel destination for European nobility.

On July 28, 1883, an earthquake destroyed the villages of Casamicciola Terme and Lacco Ameno.

Ischia developed into a well-known artist colony at the beginning of the 20th century. Writers and painters from all over the world were attracted. Eduard Bargheer, Hans Purrmann and Arrigo Wittler lived on the island. Rudolf Levy, Werner Gilles, Max Peiffer Watenphul with Kurt Craemer and Vincent Weber stayed in the fishing village of Sant'Angelo on the southern tip of the island shortly before the outbreak of the Second World War. In 1936 Ischia had a population of 30,418.

Spa tourism did not resume until the early 1950s. During this period, a remarkably vibrant artistic colony of writers, composers, and visual artists developed in Forio, including Ingeborg Bachmann. Leading figures of international cinema, such as Elizabeth Taylor and Luchino Visconti, also stayed on the island during film productions.

A decisive role in transforming Ischia into a destination for the international jet set was played by the Italian film entrepreneur, publisher, and philanthropist Angelo Rizzoli (1889–1970). Between the late 1950s and early 1960s, Rizzoli turned Lacco Ameno into an elite resort by constructing several luxury hotels, which remain to this day among the hallmarks of the island's hospitality. His initiatives attracted some of the wealthiest and most influential figures of the time. Rizzoli made Villa Arbusto—a residence built in 1785 by the Duke of Acquaviva—his private home and ensured that his newspapers and film production companies acted as powerful amplifiers for both the therapeutic benefits of Ischia's thermal waters and the glamorous social life of the "Green Island."

This far-reaching promotional and marketing strategy was reinforced by the production of numerous films set on Ischia, including Vacanze a Ischia, Appuntamento a Ischia, Cleopatra, and many others, introducing this small Mediterranean paradise to an international audience. As a result, Lacco Ameno began to attract ministers, intellectuals, industrialists, and prominent figures from the entertainment world, becoming a symbol of the Italian Dolce Vita.

These developments contributed to a new phase of social and economic growth that continues to this day. Ischia hosted several international film premieres, most notably "A King in New York" by Charlie Chaplin (1957). In 1962, Angelo Rizzoli founded the Anna Rizzoli Hospital, named after his wife, which remains the first and only hospital on the island. Rizzoli died on 24 September 1970. His legacy is preserved through the museum housed in Villa Arbusto, the main avenue of Lacco Ameno named in his honor, a cinematic award, and a bronze bust in Piazza Santa Restituta. Even today, Lacco Ameno is often described as "an island within the island," preserving the timeless atmosphere of the Dolce Vita.

Today, Ischia is an internationally significant tourist destination, welcoming up to six million visitors per year from around the world. The island is particularly known for its thermal spa facilities, Mediterranean cuisine, and the presence of high-end accommodation, which contribute to its role in wellness-oriented tourism. Over time, Ischia has attracted a range of prominent visitors, including actors, members of royal families, and political figures. Compared to other destinations such as Capri, the island's larger size allows for a greater degree of discretion and privacy. Public figures may occasionally be encountered in locations such as Lacco Ameno, the village of Sant'Angelo, or in the island's coastal areas, often accessed by sea. In the municipality of Lacco Ameno, there is a commercial area located near the seafront and several high-end hotels. The district includes boutiques offering clothing and accessories from a variety of Italian and international fashion brands, as well as jewelry shops specializing in handcrafted items made from materials such as coral, turquoise, gold, and diamonds.

=== Environmental problems ===
The sharp increase of the population between 1950 and 1980 and the growing inflow of tourists (in 2010 over 4 million tourists visited the island for at least one day) have increased the anthropic pressure on the island. Significant acreage of land previously used for agriculture has been developed for the construction of houses and residential structures. Most of this development has taken place without any planning and building permission. As at the end of 2011, the island lacked the most basic system for sewage treatment; sewage is sent directly to the sea. In 2004 one of the five communities of the island commenced civil works to build a sewage treatment plant but since then the construction has not been completed and it is currently stopped.

On June 14, 2007, there was a breakage in one of the four high-voltage underwater cables forming the power line maintained by Enel S.p.A. — although never authorised by Italian authorities – between Cuma on the Campania coast and Lacco Ameno on the island of Ischia. Inside each cable there is an 18 mm‑diameter channel filled with oil under high pressure. The breakage of the Enel cable resulted in the spillage of oil into the sea and into other environmental matrices – with the consequent pollution by polychlorobiphenyls (PCBs, the use of which was banned by the Italian authorities as long ago as 1984), polycyclic aromatic hydrocarbons (PAHs) and linear alkyl benzenes (aromatic hydrocarbons) — in the 'Regno di Nettuno', a marine protected area, and the largest ecosystem in the Mediterranean Sea, designated as a 'priority habitat' in Annex I to the Habitats Directive (92/43/EEC) and comprising oceanic posidonia beds.

To reduce pollution due to cars, Ischia has been the place of the first complete sustainable mobility project applied to an urban centre, created in 2017 with Enel in collaboration with Aldo Arcangioli, one the main Italian experts of green mobility, under the name of "Green Island".

== Geology and geography ==
The roughly trapezoidal island is formed by a complex volcano immediately southwest of the Campi Flegrei area at the western side of the Bay of Naples. The eruption of the trachytic Green Tuff Ignimbrite about 56,000 years ago was followed by the formation of a caldera comprising almost the entire island and some of the surrounding seabed. The highest point of the island, Monte Epomeo (788 m (2,585 ft)), is a volcanic horst consisting of green tuff that was submerged after its eruption and then uplifted. Volcanism on the island has been significantly affected by tectonism that formed a series of horsts and grabens; resurgent doming produced at least 800 m (2,600 ft) of uplift during the past 33,000 years. Many small monogenetic volcanoes formed around the uplifted block. Volcanism during the Holocene produced a series of pumiceous tephras, tuff rings, lava domes, and lava flows. The last eruption of Ischia, in 1302, produced a spatter cone and the Arso lava flow, which reached the NE coast.

The surrounding waters including gulfs of Gaeta, Naples and Pozzuoli are both rich and healthy, providing a habitat for around 7 species of whales and dolphins including gigantic fin and sperm whales. Special research programmes on local cetaceans have been conducted to monitor and protect this bio-diversity.

From its roughly trapezoidal shape, the island is approximately 18 nautical miles from Naples, 10 km wide from east to west, 7 km from north to south, with a coastline of 43 km and an area of approximately 46.3 km^{2}. The highest elevation is Monte Epomeo, standing at 788 meters and located in the center of the island. This is an horst, a tectonic volcano, meaning a block of the Earth's crust that has been uplifted compared to the surrounding crust due to magmatic pressure (horst is a German term meaning "rock"). Monte Epomeo is mistakenly thought of as a volcano, although it lacks any volcanic characteristics. Island volcanism, in fact, is particularly prevalent along the fractures that border the horst, namely Monte Epomeo.

Strabo reports what the Greek historian Timeo said about a tsunami that occurred in Ischia shortly before his time. Following the volcanic activity of Epomeo, "...the sea receded for three stages; afterwards (...) it turned back again and its ebb tide submerged the island (...) those who lived on the mainland fled from the coast into the interior of Campania" (Geography V, 4, 9). Cumae, not far from that coast, in Greek means "wave". Volcanic activity on Ischia has generally been characterized by eruptions that were not very significant and occurred at great intervals. After eruptions in Greek and Roman times, the last one occurred in 1302 in the eastern sector of the island with a brief flow (known as Arso) reaching the sea.

== Demographics ==
Historical population
Year	Pop.	±%
1861	23,511	—
1871	25,322	+7.7%
1881	25,903	+2.3%
1901	27,613	+6.6%
1911	28,487	+3.2%
1921	31,406	+10.2%
1931	31,284	−0.4%
1936	30,418	−2.8%
1951	31,813	+4.6%
1961	34,213	+7.5%
1971	39,126	+14.4%
1981	44,089	+12.7%
1991	48,622	+10.3%
2001	56,105	+15.4%
2011	61,086	+8.9%
2021	62,374	+2.1%
Source: ISTAT

As of 2026, the population is 61,727, of which 49.5% are male, and 50.5% are female. Minors make up 14.9% of the population, and seniors make up 22.8%.

=== Immigration ===
As of 2025, immigrants make up 9.5% of the population.

== Winemaking ==
The island of Ischia is home to the eponymous Denominazione di origine controllata (DOC) that produces both red and white wines though white wines account for nearly 80% of the island's wine production. Vineyards planted within the 179 hectares (440 acres) boundaries of the DOC tend to be on volcanic soils with high pumice, phosphorus and potassium content.

The white wines of the island are composed primarily of Forastera (at least 65% according to DOC regulation) and Biancolella (up to 20%) with up to 15% of other local grape varieties such as Arilla and San Lunardo. Grapes are limited to a harvest yield of no more than 10 tonnes/ha with a finished minimum alcohol level of at least 11%. For wines labeled as Bianco Superiore, the yield is further restricted to a maximum of 8 tonnes/ha with a minimum alcohol level of 12%. Only certain subareas of the Ischia DOC can produce Bianco Superiore with the blend needing to contain 50% Forastera, 40% Biancolella and 10% San Lunardo.

Red wines produced under the Ischia DOC are composed of 50% Guarnaccia, 40% Piedirosso (known under the local synonym of Per'e Palummo) and 10% Barbera. Like the white wines, red grapes destined for DOC production are limited to a harvest yield of no more than 10 tonnes/ha though the minimum finished alcohol level is higher at 11.5% ABV.

In recent years, Ischia has also experienced a revival of artisanal distillation, complementing its long-established wine-making tradition. Local producers have focused on transforming island-grown citrus fruits, figs, carob pods and Mediterranean botanicals into spirits and liqueurs, with an emphasis on preserving traditional techniques and strengthening local agricultural supply chains.

The revival of distilling has also contributed to the island's food and beverage tourism, with production facilities located within the historic village of Ischia Ponte, reflecting the historical relationship between agricultural production and the urban fabric of the island.

== Traditional food ==
Originating in Ischia, Coniglio all'Ischitana is a major part of Ischia's cuisine. This is a slow-cooked rabbit dish, made with tomatoes, garlic, white wine, and fresh herbs. Ischia has a wide selection of seafood, considering its location in the Mediterranean sea. Common seafood dishes include grilled sea bass, spaghetti alle vongole, and fried calamari. Bruschetta is a popular appetizer eaten in Ischia. This dish consists of toasted bread drizzled with olive oil and garlic, topped with a salad of cherry tomatoes, basil, olive oil and herbs.

== Main sights ==
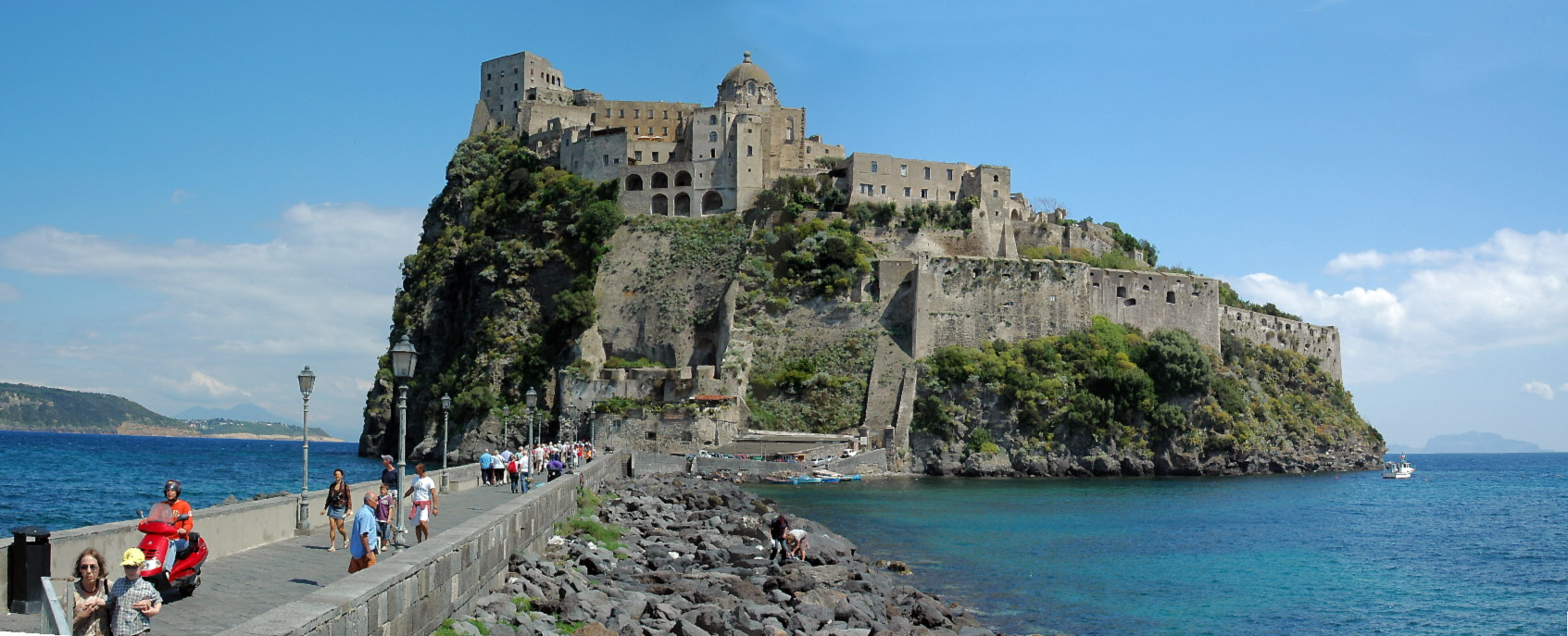
Castello Aragonese

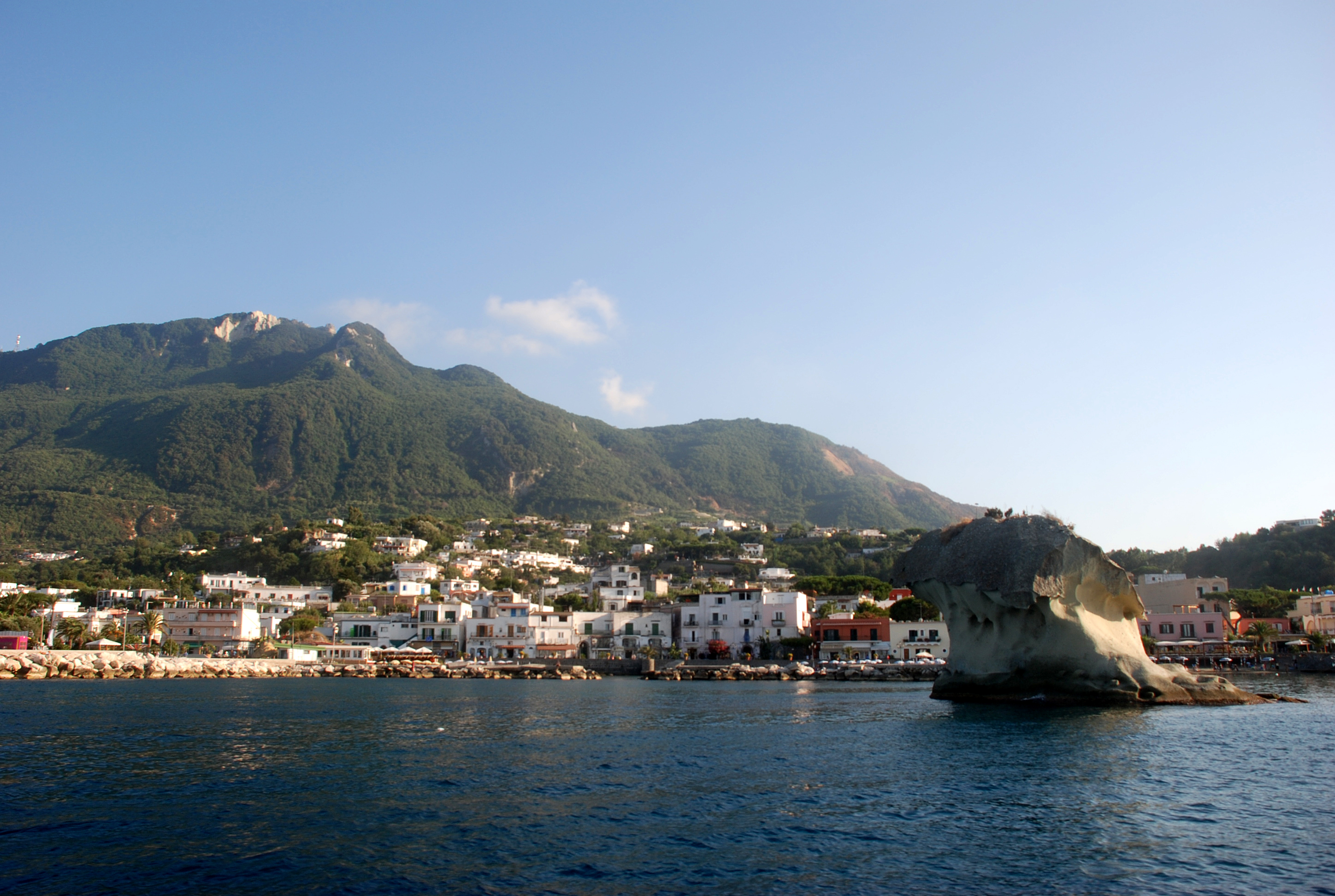
Lacco Ameno

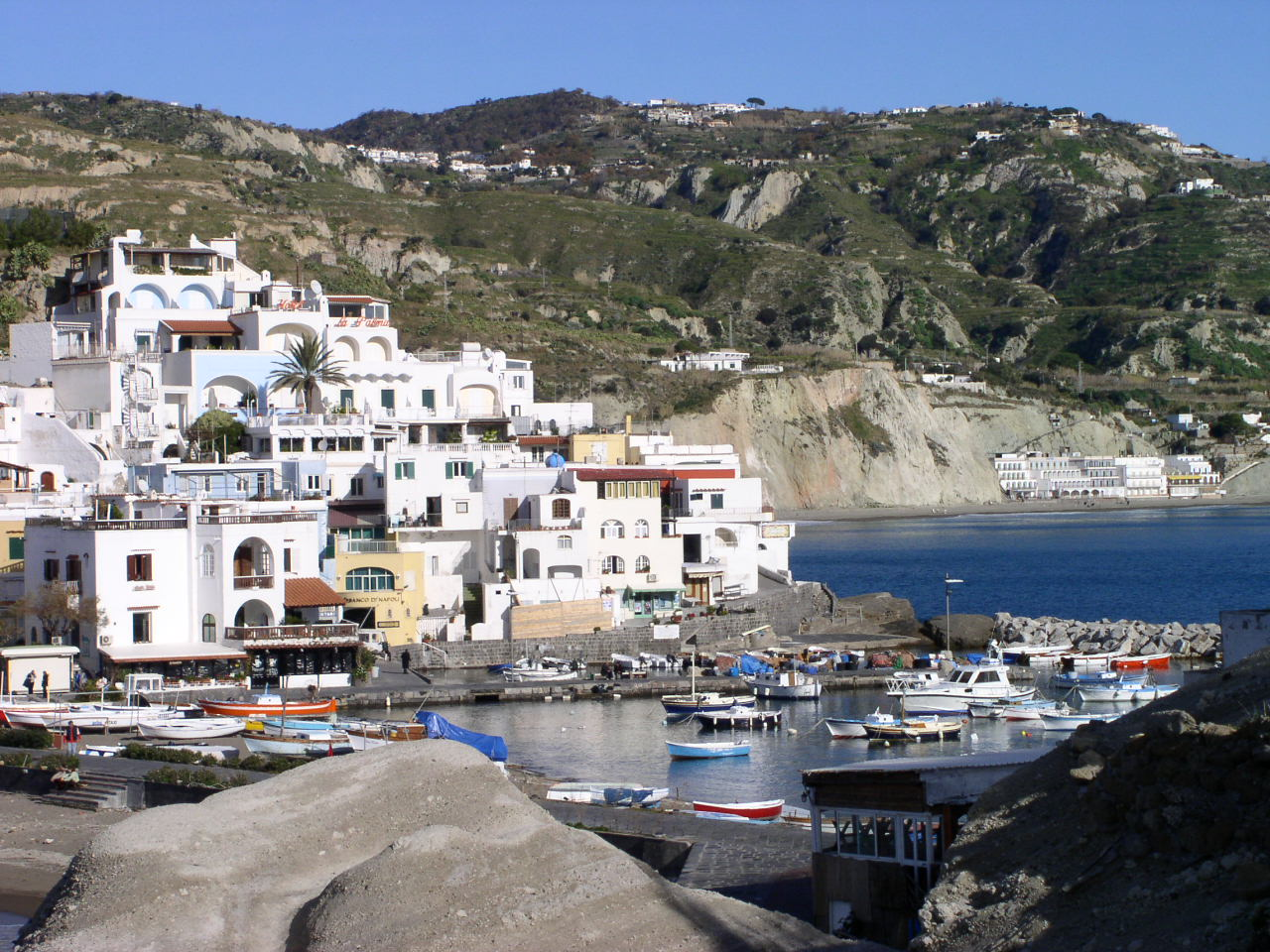
S. Angelo d'Ischia

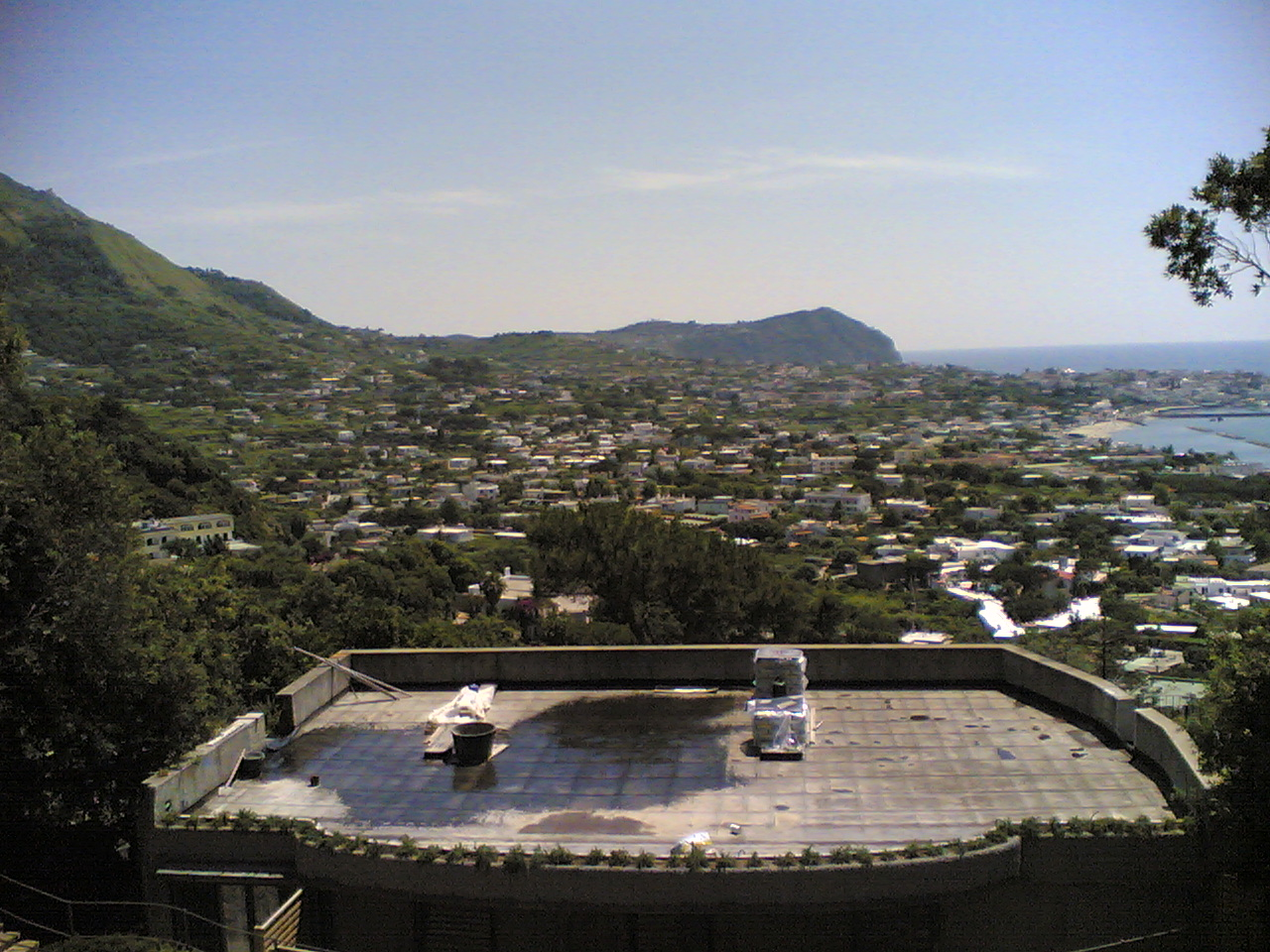
View From La Mortella

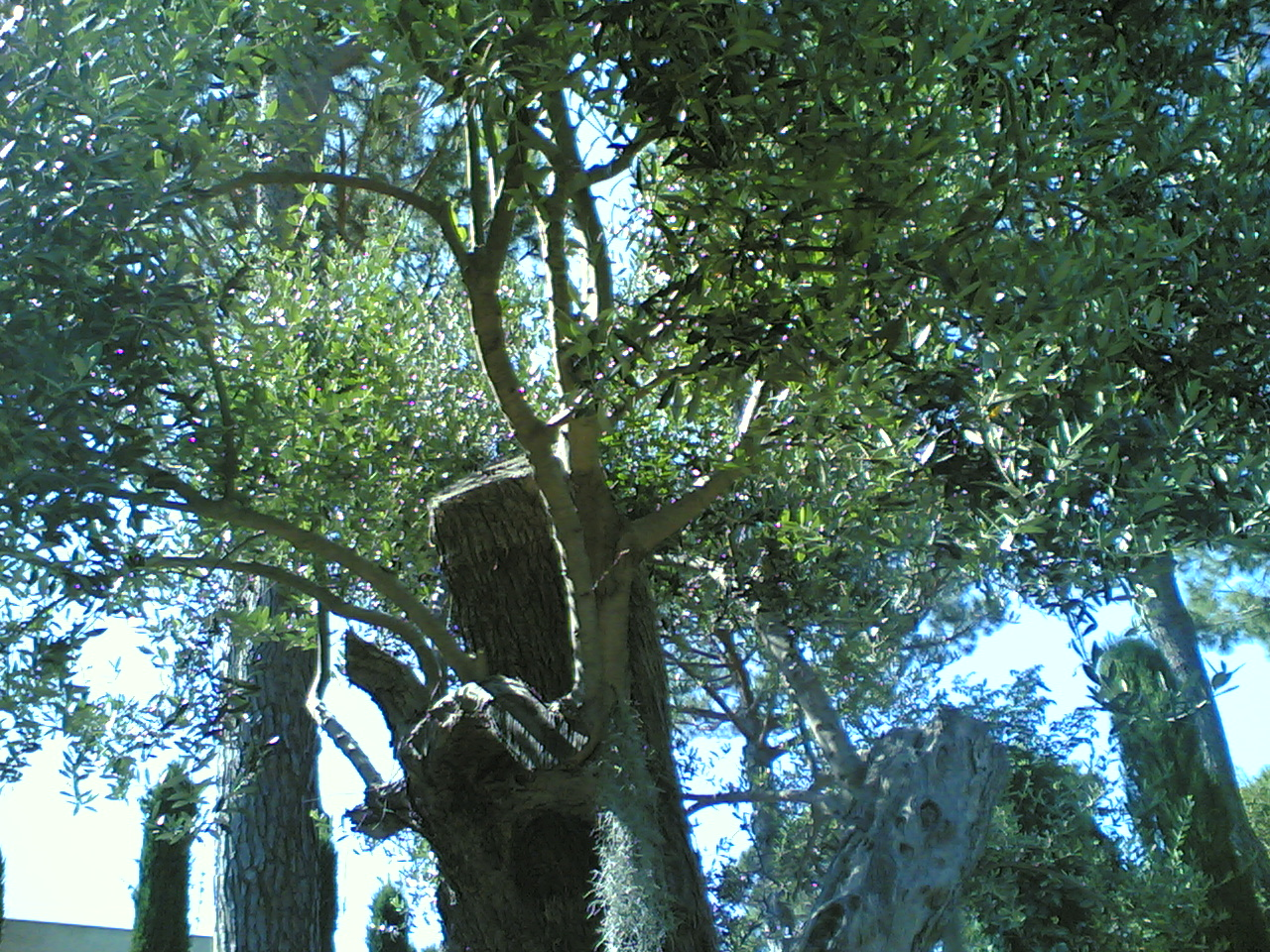
Ancient Olive tree in La Mortella

=== Aragonese Castle ===
The Aragonese Castle (Castello Aragonese, Ischia Ponte) was built on a rock near the island in 474 BC, by Hiero I of Syracuse. At the same time, two towers were built to control enemy fleets' movements. The rock was then occupied by Parthenopeans (the ancient inhabitants of Naples). In 326 BC the fortress was captured by Romans, and then again by the Parthenopeans. In 1441 Alfonso V of Aragon connected the rock to the island with a stone bridge instead of the prior wood bridge, and fortified the walls to defend the inhabitants against the raids of pirates. Around 1700, about 2000 families lived on the islet, including a Poor Clares convent, an abbey of Basilian monks (of the Greek Orthodox Church), the bishop and the seminar, and the prince, with a military garrison. There were also thirteen churches. In 1912, the castle was sold to a private owner. Today the castle is the most visited monument of the island. It is accessed through a tunnel with large openings which let the light enter. Along the tunnel there is a small chapel consecrated to Saint John Joseph of the Cross (San Giovan Giuseppe della Croce), the patron saint of the island. A more comfortable access is also possible with a modern lift. After arriving outside, it is possible to visit the Church of the Immacolata and the Cathedral of Assunta. The first was built in 1737 on the location of a smaller chapel dedicated to Saint Francis, and closed after the suppression of convents in 1806, as well as the Poor Clares convent.

=== Gardens of La Mortella ===
The gardens, located in Forio-San Francesco, were originally the property of English composer William Walton. Walton lived in the villa next to the gardens with his Argentine wife Susana. When the composer arrived on the island in 1946, he immediately called Russell Page from England to lay out the garden. Wonderful tropical and Mediterranean plants were planted and some have now reached amazing proportions. The gardens include wonderful views over the city and harbour of Forio. A museum dedicated to the life and work of William Walton now comprises part of the garden complex. There's also a recital room where renowned musical artists perform on a regular schedule.

=== Villa La Colombaia ===
Villa La Colombaia is located in Lacco Ameno and Forio territories. Surrounded by a park, the villa (called "The Dovecote") was made by Luigi Patalano, a famous local socialist and journalist. It is now the seat of a cultural institution and museum dedicated to Luchino Visconti. The institution promotes cultural activities such as music, cinema, theatre, art exhibitions, workshops and cinema reviews. The villa and the park are open to the public.

=== Others ===
- Sant'Angelo (Sant'Angelo, in the comune of Serrara Fontana)
- Maronti Beach (Barano d'Ischia)
- Church of the Soccorso' (Forio)
- Piazza S.Restituta, with the best luxury boutiques (Lacco Ameno)
- Bay of Sorgeto, with hot thermal springs (Panza)
- Poseidon Gardens – spa with several thermal pools (Panza)
- Citara Beach (Panza)
- English's Beach (Ischia)
- Pitthekoussai Archaeological museum
- The Angelo Rizzoli museum

== Voluntary associations ==
Committees and associations work to promote tourism on the island, and provide services and activities for residents. Among these are:

- Il coniglio di Rocco Alfarano, associazione per la protezione del quadrupede sull’isola
- Accaparlante Società Cooperativa Sociale, Via Sant'Alessandro
- Associazione Donatori Volontari di Sangue, Via Iasolino, 1
- Associazione Nemo per la Diffusione della Cultura del Mare, via Regina Elena, 75 Cellulare: 366–1270197
- Associazione Progetto Emmaus, Via Acquedotto, 65
- A.V.I. Associazione Volontariato e Protezione Civile Isola D'Ischia, Via Delle Terme, 88
- Cooperativa Sociale Arkè onlus, Via delle Terme, 76/R Telefono: 081–981342
- Cooperativa Sociale Asat Ischia onlus, Via delle Terme, 76/R Telefono: 081–3334228
- Cooperativa Sociale kairòs onlus, Via delle Terme, 76/R
- Kalimera Società Cooperativa Sociale, Via Fondo Bosso, 20
- Pan Assoverdi Salvanatura, Via Delle Terme, 53/C
- Prima Ischia – Onlus, Via Iasolino, 102

== In literature and the arts ==
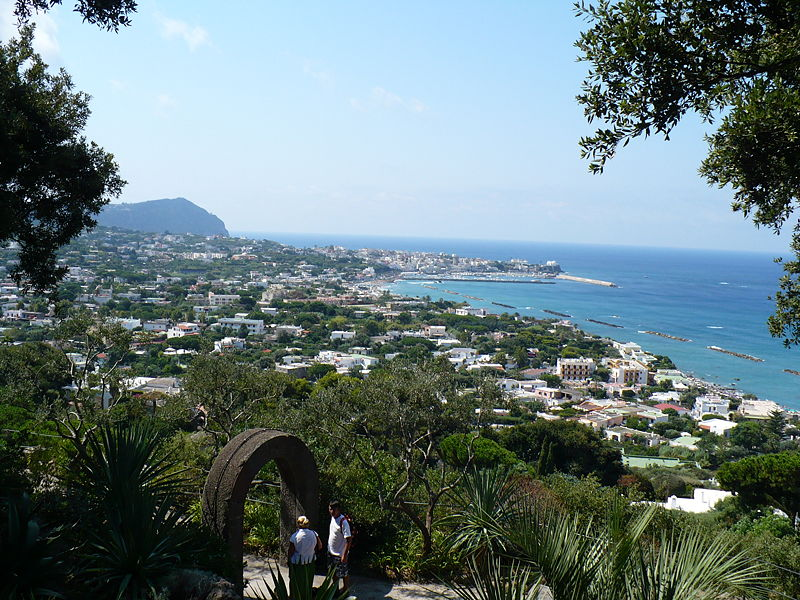
The view from the Waltons' house – La Mortella

=== Events ===
The island is home to the Ischia Film Festival, an international cinema competition celebrated in June or July, dedicated to all the works that have promoted the value of the local territory.

=== Notable guests and works ===
- The Italian politician Giuseppe Garibaldi, one of the most important figures of Italian unification, stayed on the island for healing himself from a serious injury and finding relief in the peaceful area of Casamicciola Terme (at the Manzi Hotel).
- The Russian revolutionary Mikhail Bakunin, stayed in Ischia between July 1866 and June 1867, from where he wrote political letters to Alexander Herzen and Nikolai Ogarev.
- In 1867 Norwegian playwright Henrik Ibsen wrote the 3rd act of the major dramatic play in verse Peer Gynt while living in the village of Casamicciola Terme. The house he stayed is now called Villa Ibsen. Ibsen was forced to leave Ischia because of the 1867 earthquake.
- In May 1948 W. H. Auden wrote his poem "In Praise of Limestone" here, the first poem he wrote in Italy.
- In 1949, British classical composer William Walton settled in Ischia. In 1956, he sold his London house and took up full-time residence on Ischia; he built a hilltop house at Forio, called it La Mortella, and Susana Walton created a magnificent garden there. Walton lived on the island for the remainder of his life and died there in 1983.
- German composer Hans Werner Henze lived on the island from 1953 to 1956 and wrote his Quattro Poemi (1955) there.
- Samuel Taylor's Broadway play Avanti! (1968) takes place on the island.
- Hergé's series of comic albums, The Adventures of Tintin (1907–1983), ends in Ischia, which serves as the location of Endaddine Akass' villa in the unfinished 24th and final book, Tintin and Alph-Art.
- French novelist Pascal Quignard set much of his novel Villa Amalia (2006) on the island.
- In Elena Ferrante's series of Neapolitan Novels, the island serves as the setting of several summer holidays of the main characters.

=== Film setting ===
In addition to the works noted above, multiple media works have been set or filmed on the island. For example:

- The American swashbuckler film The Crimson Pirate (1952) was filmed on and around the island during the summer of 1951.
- Part of Purple Noon ("Plein Soleil", 1959), directed by René Clément starring Alain Delon and Marie Laforêt
- Avanti! (1972), starring Jack Lemmon and Juliet Mills.
- Scenes of Cleopatra (1963), starring Elizabeth Taylor, were filmed on the island.
- Ischia Ponte stood in for "Mongibello" in the Hollywood film of The Talented Mr. Ripley (1999).
- The American film And While We Were Here (2012), starring Kate Bosworth, was filmed on the island.
- Castello Aragonese was used as the 'Riva's Fortified Fortress' island in Men in Black: International (2019).

== International relations ==
=== Twin towns - sister cities ===
- (United States) Los Angeles, California, USA (2006)
- (United States) Cambridge, Massachusetts, USA (2006)
- Maloyaroslavets, Russia

== See also ==
- List of islands of Italy
- List of castles in Italy
- List of volcanoes in Italy
- Castello d'Ischia Lighthouse
- 2017 Ischia earthquake

== Bibliography ==
- Richard Stillwell, ed. Princeton Encyclopedia of Classical Sites, 1976: "Aenaria (Ischia), Italy".
- Ridgway, D. "The First Western Greeks" Cambridge University Press, 1993. ISBN 0-521-42164-0
- Kennedy, Michael (1989). Portrait of Walton. Oxford: Oxford University Press. ISBN 978-0-19-816705-1.
