= Serrara Fontana =

- Comune
- Comune di Serrara Fontana
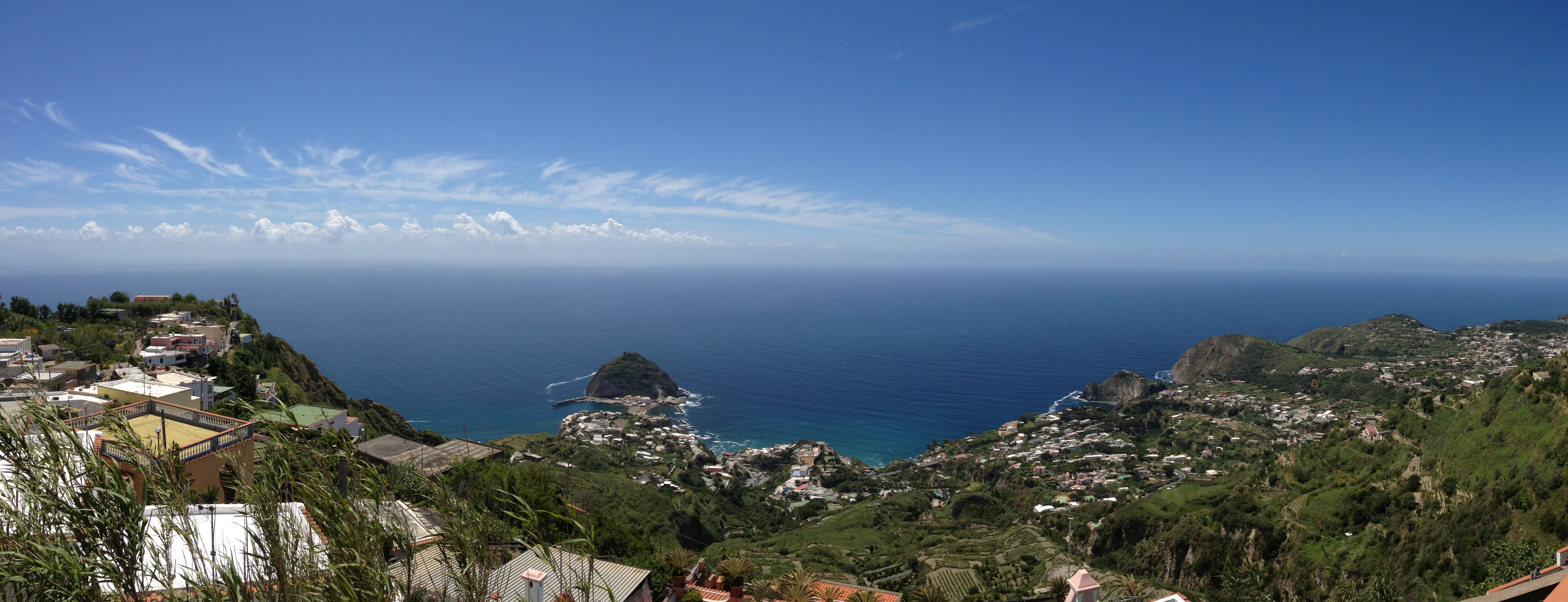
- View of Serrara

- Coat of arms

- Location within Italy Location within Campania
- Coordinates: 40°43′N 13°54′E
- Country: Italy
- Region: Campania
- Metropolitan city: Naples (NA)
- Frazioni: Ciglio, Fontana, Martofa, Migliaccia, Sant'Angelo d'Ischia, Serrara (communal seat), Succhivo d'Ischia

Government
  - Mayor: Rosario Caruso

Area
  - Total: 6.44 km^{2} (2.49 sq mi)
- Elevation: 800 m (2,600 ft)

Population (2026)
  - Total: 3,065
  - Density: 476/km^{2} (1,230/sq mi)
- Demonym: Serraresi
- Time zone: UTC+1 (CET)
  - Summer (DST): UTC+2 (CEST)
- Postal code: 80070
- Dialing code: 081
- Patron saint: Saint Vincent
- Saint day: 5 April
- Website: Official website

Serrara Fontana is a town and comune (municipality) on the island of Ischia, in the Metropolitan City of Naples of the region of Campania in Italy. It has 3,065 inhabitants.

It is the highest and the smallest municipality of the island. It was created by the union of the former villages of Serrara and Fontana.

Its territory comprises several small villages: Noia, Calimera, Ciglio, Succhivo, Sant'Angelo, located on different elevations from the mountains to the sea.

Serrara Fontana borders the municipalities of Barano d'Ischia, Casamicciola Terme, and Forio.

German chancellor Angela Merkel and her husband spend their summer vacation in the region on a regular basis.

== Demographics ==
As of 2026, the population is 3,065, of which 49.0% are male, and 51.0% are female. Minors make up 14.3% of the population, and seniors make up 25.0%.

Historical population

Year	Pop.	±%
1861	1,845	—
1871	1,904	+3.2%
1881	1,972	+3.6%
1901	2,326	+18.0%
1911	2,495	+7.3%
1921	2,254	−9.7%
1931	2,279	+1.1%
1936	2,292	+0.6%

Year	Pop.	±%
1951	2,293	+0.0%
1961	2,323	+1.3%
1971	2,365	+1.8%
1981	2,595	+9.7%
1991	2,904	+11.9%
2001	3,060	+5.4%
2011	3,164	+3.4%
2021	3,044	−3.8%

Source: ISTAT

=== Immigration ===
As of 2025, immigrants make up 9.2% of the population. The 5 largest foreign countries of birth are Germany, Morocco, Romania, Ukraine, and the United States.
