= Vesuvius National Park =

National park in Italy

Coordinates: 40°49′01″N 14°25′37″E

Parco Nazionale del Vesuvio
- IUCN category II (national park)
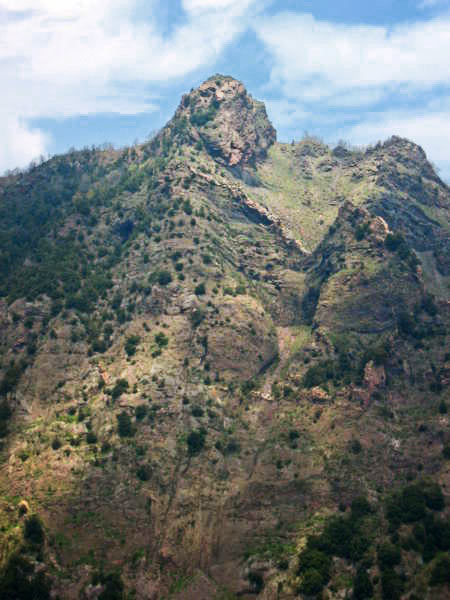
- A view in the park

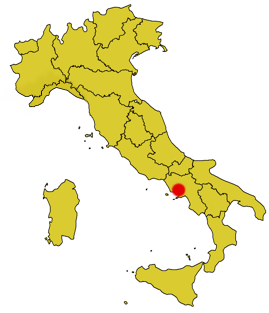
- Location of Vesuvius
- Location: Campania
- Nearest city: Torre del Greco
- Area: 72.59 km^{2} (28.03 sq mi)
- Established: June 5, 1995
- Governing body: Ministero dell'Ambiente
- Website: www.parks.it/parco.nazionale.vesuvio/Eindex.html

Vesuvius National Park (Italian: Parco Nazionale del Vesuvio) is an Italian national park centered on the active volcano Vesuvius, southeast from Naples. The park was founded on June 5, 1995, and covers an area of around 135 square kilometers all located within the Province of Naples.

It is centered on the active volcano and its most ancient (now inactive) crater, Monte Somma. It houses 612 plant species and 227 wildlife ones.

== See also ==
- Pompeii
- Herculaneum
- Boscoreale
- Boscotrecase
- Ercolano
- Massa di Somma
- Ottaviano
- Pollena Trocchia
- San Giuseppe Vesuviano
- San Sebastiano al Vesuvio
- Sant'Anastasia
- Somma Vesuviana
- Terzigno
- Torre Annunziata
- Torre del Greco
- Trecase
