= Ornate Style =

Although many styles in different media may be called "ornate", ornate style as a distinct style term is used in two contexts:

- The Red-figure vase painting of ancient Greece, where it, and a contrasting "plain style", developed in Apulia around 400 BC.
- The third of the Pompeian Styles of ancient Roman wall-paintings, popular around 20–10 BC.
