= Boscotrecase =

Municipality in Campania, Italy

Boscotrecase Vuoscotreccase (Neapolitan)
- Comune
- Comune di Boscotrecase
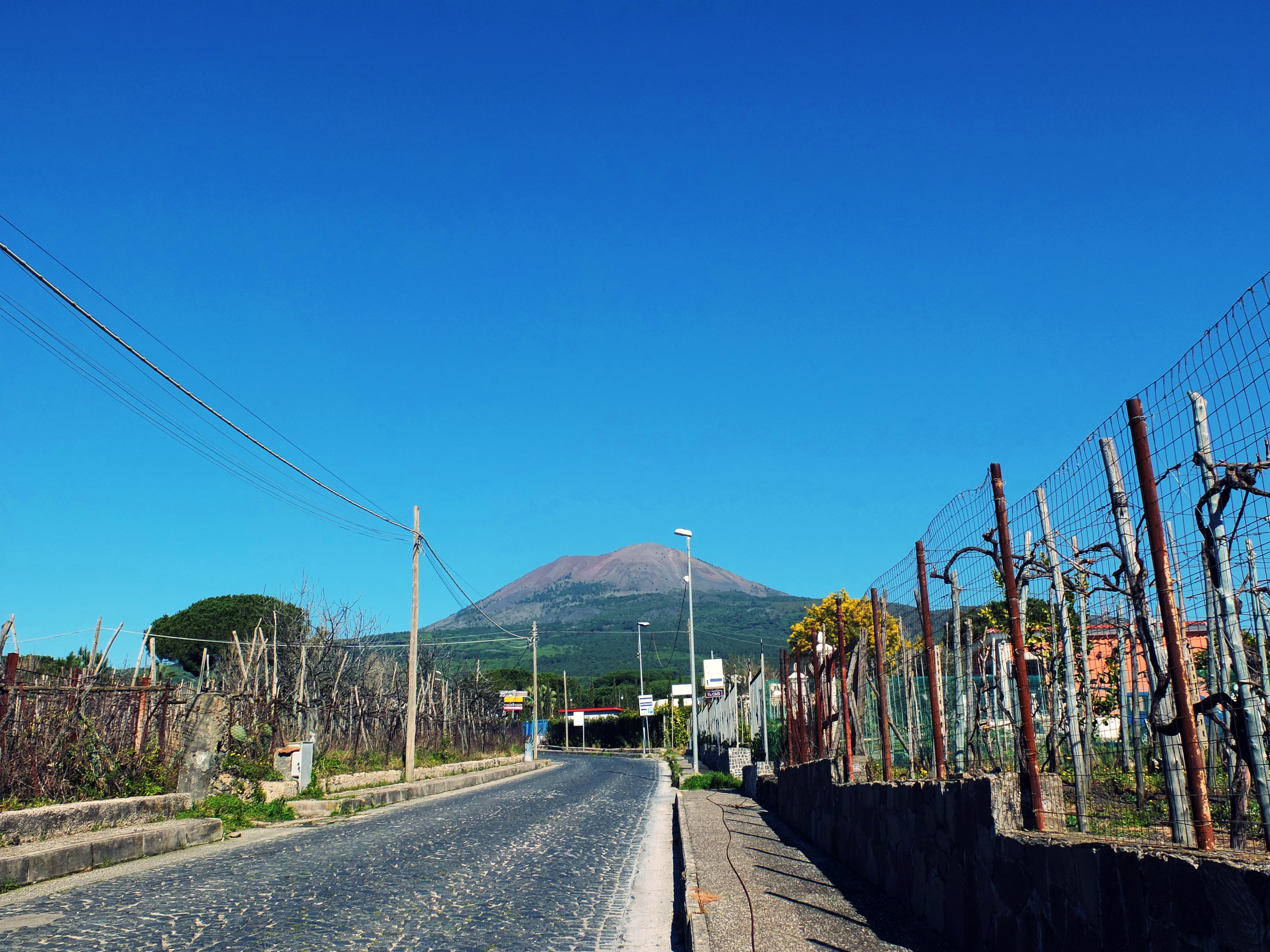
- Lacryma Christi vineyard below Mount Vesuvius

- Coat of arms

- The territory of Boscotrecase in the metropolitan city of Naples

- Location of Boscotrecase in Italy Boscotrecase (Campania)
- Coordinates: 40°47′N 14°28′E
- Country: Italy
- Region: Campania
- Metropolitan city: Naples (NA)

Government
  - Mayor: Pietro Carotenuto (Free Boscotrecase)

Area
  - Total: 7.5 km^{2} (2.9 sq mi)
- Elevation: 86 m (282 ft)

Population (31 December 2022)
  - Total: 9,790
  - Density: 1,300/km^{2} (3,400/sq mi)
- Demonym: Boschesi
- Time zone: UTC+1 (CET)
  - Summer (DST): UTC+2 (CEST)
- Postal code: 80042
- Dialing code: 081
- Patron saint: Saint Anne
- Saint day: 26 July
- Website: Official website

Boscotrecase (Italian: [ˌbɔskotre(k)ˈkaːse, -aːze]; Neapolitan: Vuoscotreccase; "Three-House Grove") is a town and municipality of 9,790 inhabitants in the metropolitan city of Naples in Campania, Italy.

Before the eruption of Mount Vesuvius in 79 AD, Boscotrecase was home to Roman villas, such as the Villa of Agrippa Postumus. In 1337, three monasteries were founded in the area, which led to the formation of the town. Through the centuries, multiple feudal lords oversaw the town. In the late 19th Century, the town suffered from brigands. Lava flows from Mount Vesuvius and almost destroyed the town in 1906.

Lying below Vesuvius National Park, it enjoys a view over the entire gulf of Naples. The area above the town has vineyards which produce Lacryma Christi wine. Tourism and artisanal crafts such as stonework and barrel-making also contribute to the economy of the town.

== History ==
=== Roman times ===
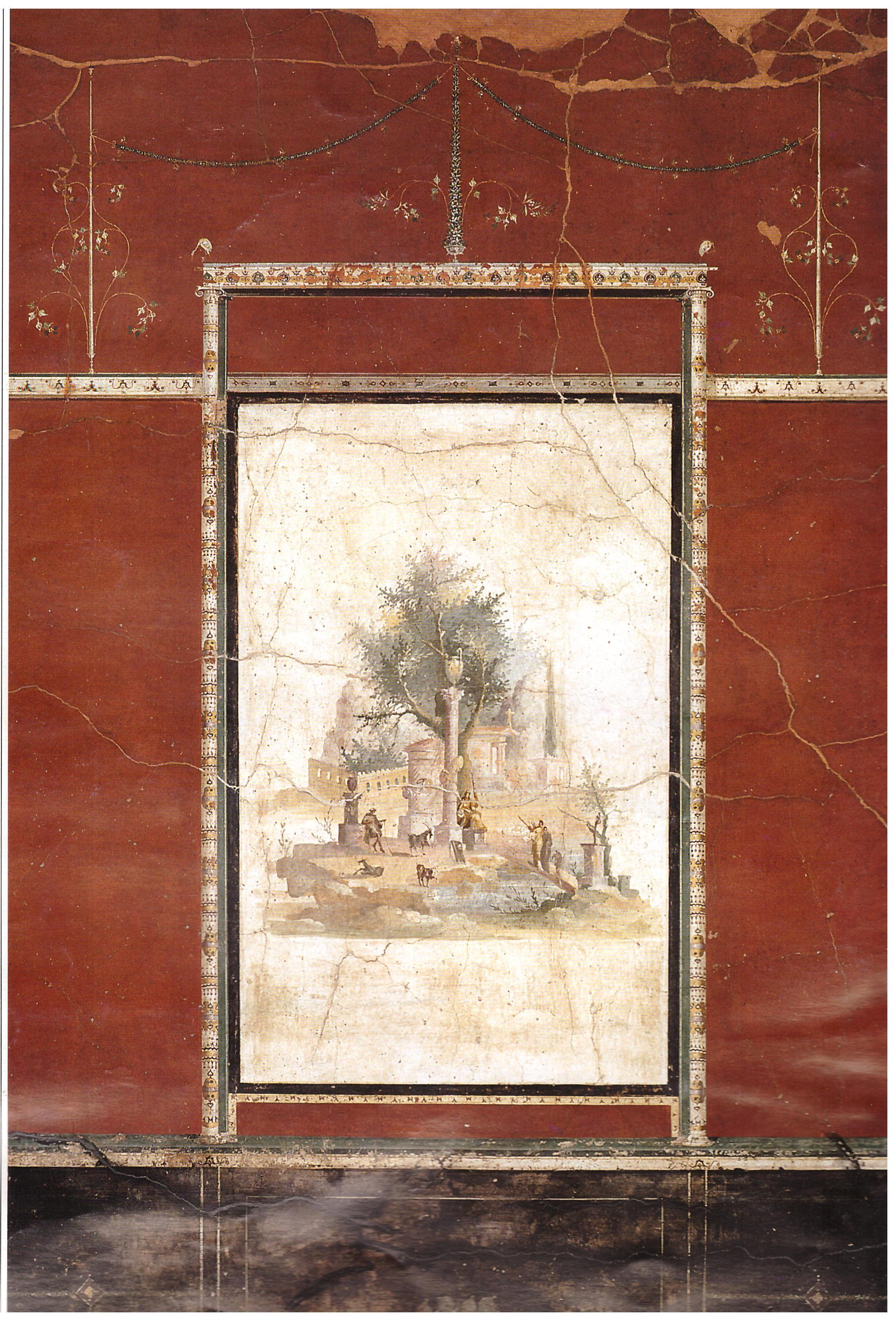
Fresco of the Third Pompeian style of the Villa of Agrippa Postumus

In Roman times, the entire wooded area took the name of Pagus Felix Suburbanus in honour of Lucius Cornelius Sulla, who was known as Felix. Under Augustus, the area was called Pagus Augustus Felix Suburbanus. The area attracted the construction of vacation villas for the Romans. The Villa of Agrippa Postumus is an important archaeological site, buried by the Eruption of Mount Vesuvius in 79 AD, discovered in 1903. Agrippa Postumus was the son of Marcus Vipsanius Agrippa and Julia the Elder, daughter of Augustus. Archaeological work on the site was interrupted by the 1906 eruption of Vesuvius, which reburied much of the site. The villa contained numerous frescoes of the third Pompeian style.

Boscotrecase is home to other Roman archaeological sites. In 1770 and 1774, a number of gold and silver coins and some bronze statues were discovered, which are now kept in the Royal Museum of Portici. In 1899, a villa belonging to L. Arelli Successi was unearthed, which contained tombs, Christian lamps, remains of an aqueduct, and a wine cellar.

=== The Middle Ages ===
Following the eruption of 79 AD, the area was abandoned for a long time. A thick forest grew, and the area was known as Silva mala ("bad forest"). Around the year 1000, the area was part of the fiefdom of the Baron of Ottaviano, who may have built a church dedicated to San Gennaro. In the first half of the 1200s, Frederick II of Swabia detached the area from the Barony of Ottaviano, in order to use it as a personal hunting reserve. After Frederick, the area returned to the Barony, but was re-detached in 28 March 1337 by Robert of Anjou, who donated it to three convents, including one dedicated to Santa Maria Maddalena, founded by his wife Sancia of Majorca. Joanna I of Naples later confirmed the transfer, after her grandfather Robert's death. Because of the three convents, the area became known as Bosci Trium Domorum ("Woods of the Three Houses"), which over time was changed to "Boscotrecase".

Between the 14th and 15th Centuries, Raimondo Orsini del Balzo, Count of Nola, built various watchtowers in the area to defend the territory against pirate raids. One of these towers still stands, surviving centuries of eruptions and earthquakes caused by Vesuvius.

=== 16th through 18th Centuries ===
In the 16th and 17th centuries, the population of Boscotrecase increased, and the first districts of Oratorio and Annuziatella were formed. Oratorio takes its name from an oratory dedicated to the Nativity of the Blessed Virgin Mary. Annuziatella takes its name from a chapel dedicated to the Annunciation, which was run by the Celestines until 1807. Annuziatella became a parish church in 1668, named Ave Gratia Plena.

Philip III of Spain ceded Boscotrecase to Marco Antonio Jodice of Genoa, as payment for debts. The Viceroy Count of Lemos then gave the area to Giovanni Piccolomini. By 1600, the population of Boscotrecase exceeded 7000: the existing parish churches could not accommodate this large population. Citizens pushed the Curia of Naples to build 3 new churches: the Church of Sant' Anna in Oratorio, the Ave Gratia Plena in Annuziatella, and the Church of the Holy Spirit in the Terra Vecchia district. Only the Ave Gratia Plena was independent from the municipality of Boscotrecase. The request was approved by Cardinal Innico Caracciolo. Copious donations from the nobles of the town allowed the three parishes to grow and beautify over the years.

In 1696, a dispute over land boundaries arose between the three monasteries that owned Silva mala. Giacomo Cantelmo formed a commission; including experts from Santa Chiara, Naples; to decide the matter. The commission decided to re-establish the Angevin boundaries of Silva mala from 1337.

The 18th Century was a golden age for Boscotrecase, despite the constant activity of Mount Vesuvius. The population exceeded 10,000 people, while agriculture, industries, and the economy thrived. Most of the fields in the area were cultivated with vineyards and orchards. After agriculture, the main source of income was handicrafts. The slabs that paved the streets of many cities in the Kingdom of Naples came from Vesuvian stone mined in Boscotrecase. This stone was also used for window sills, thresholds, portals and sculptures. Stonemasons from Boscotrecase were in demand throughout the Kingdom. Another important craft was the production of barrels, which continues to this day.

Thanks to the wealthy economy, the two parish churches were enlarged and embellished with altars made from polychrome marble and with numerous paintings. The municipality also enlarged the parish church of Sant'Anna. Two confraternities were established, the Confraternity of the Rosary and the Confraternity of the Immaculate Conception. In 1774, the Chapel of San Gennaro was built by the Vitelli family, one of the powerful families in the Vesuvian area. Numerous palaces in the neoclassical style were built along the main streets of the town, including Palazzo Collaro, Palazzo Monticelli, and Villa Rota.

=== 19th Century ===
On 3 February 1807, Joseph Bonaparte, king of Naples, suppressed all non-mendicant religious orders, which caused the Celestines to abandon the Church of the Annunziatella. In 1810, the Terra Vecchia district was annexed to the municipality of Torre Annunziata. In that same year, the feudal fief was negated and Joachim Murat took the wooded area away from the three monasteries of Naples, dividing the land and selling it to different families.

After the unification of Italy, Boscotrecase was plagued by brigands, led by Antonio Cozzolino, who was also known as "Pilone". The brigands attack the carriage of Marquis Avitabile, the director of Banco di Napoli. They extorted 20,000 ducats (equivalent to 70 kg of gold, or 4 million euros at 2023 prices).

Tourism increased in importance in the 19th century. In 1894, Gennaro Matrone designed Strada Matrone, a road that leads to the crater of Vesuvius. The building of the road stimulating opening of numerous hotels, restaurants, and campsites. Townspeople earned their living by taking tourists in carriages on the road partway up the volcano. Other people offered to carry tourists on sedan chairs all the way to the summit.

=== The 1906 eruption ===
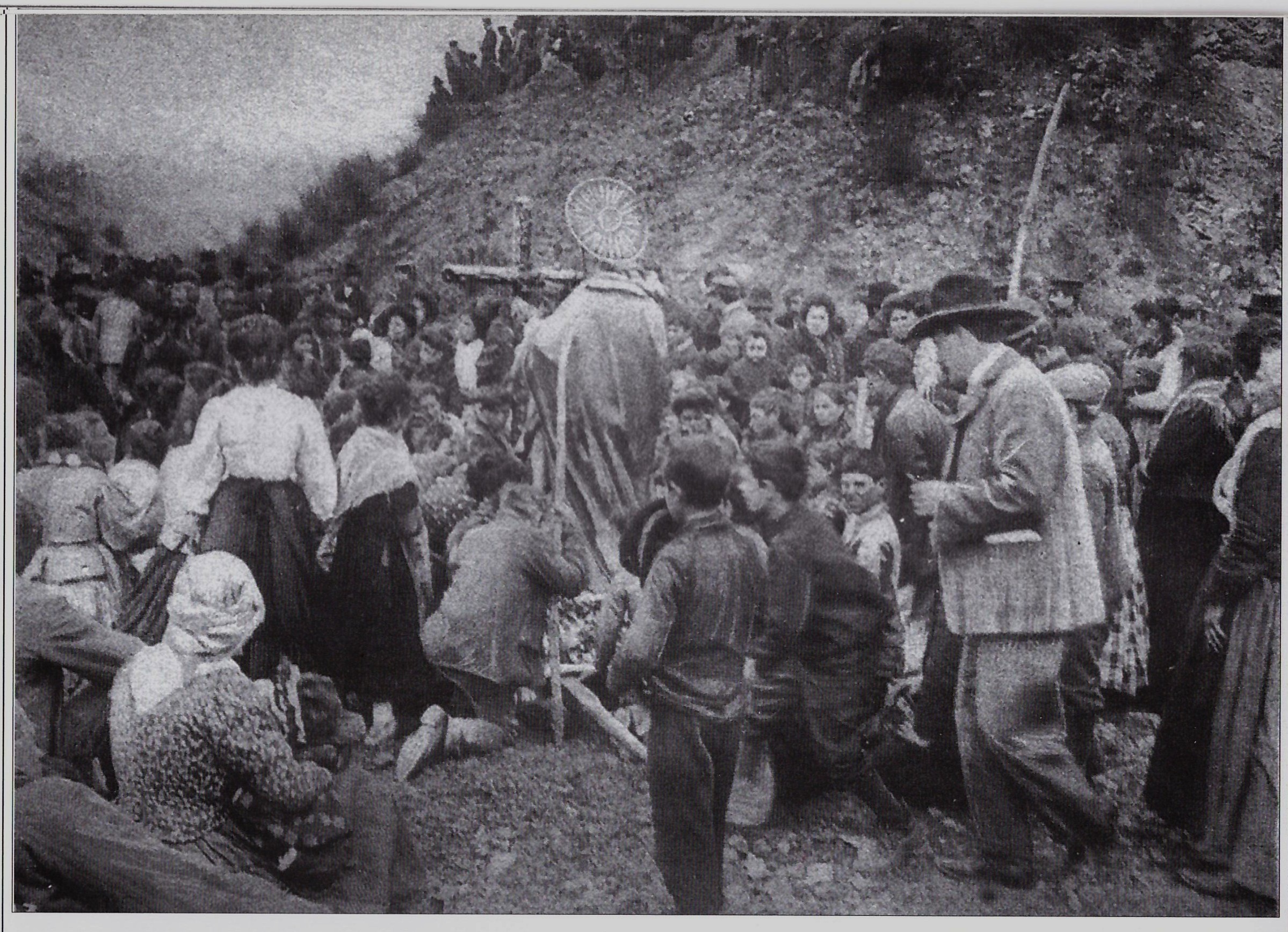
The procession of Saint Anne on 7 April 1906

After a decade of quiescence, Vesuvius restarted activity at the end of March 1906. On the morning of 6 April, Vesuvius had an explosive eruption which opened several lava vents with 300-metre (1,000 ft)-tall fountains of lava. Lava started to flow in a 60-metre (200 ft)-wide river towards Boscotrecase, and split into two lava flows: one flowing towards Oratorio, the other towards the Casavitelli district.

Residents mostly abandoned Boscotrecase. Some residents formed a long procession and brought the statue of Sant'Anna, the patroness of Boscotrecase, to avert the lava flow. While the Church of Sant'Anna was surrounded by lava, most of Boscotrecase was spared. The flow that aimed at Casavitelli and Annunziatella was diverted by Vallone Izzo, a valley immediately below town. The flow that aimed at Oratorio stopped at a lava stone quarry.

By 15 April, the eruption ended with only 3 dead in Boscotrecase (out of 100 fatalities from the entire eruption). The town carried out another procession of the statue of Sant'Anna to give thanks. A street in Oratorio was named after the Italian VIII Infantry Regiment, which had come to help the population during the eruption.

=== Recent history ===
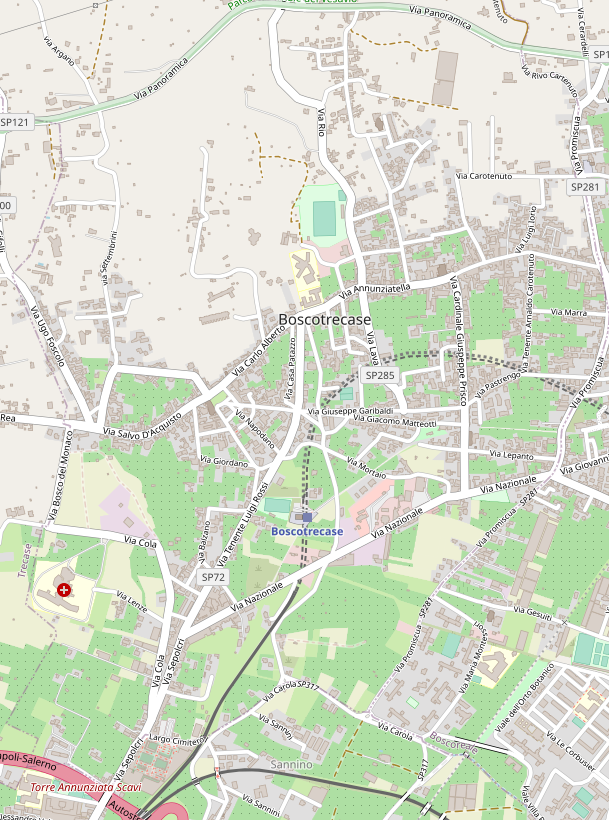
Map of Boscotrecase

In the years that followed the 1906 eruption, the streets were cleared of lava, and life returned to normal. On 8 November 1913, Cardinal Giuseppe Antonio Ermenegildo Prisco consecrated two churches: San Francesco d'Assisinear Piazza Sant'Anna and San Francesco di Sales. On 16 November 1924, a bronze Unknown Soldier statue was erected in Piazza Annuziatella to honour the dead of World War I.

In 1928, under the fascist government, Boscotrecase and Boscoreale were annexed to the municipality of Torre Annunziata. The two town regained their autonomy on 15 March 1946, under the mayor Nicola Ricciardi.

In 1935, the chapel of S.S. Addolorata became a parish church, while the elementary school was started the following year. In 1968, the new parish church of S.S. Addolorata was consecrated. In 1972, a new church of San Francesco di Sales in Casavittelli replaced the old one, which collapsed on 21 February 1974 following a storm.

In 1973, a new municipal building was inaugurated. In 1990, the Francesca Library in the church of San Francesco d'Assisi opened. In 2008, the Strada Matrone reopened after being closed since the 1980s. In 2010, the new Circumvesuviana train station opened.

== Geography ==
Boscotrecase borders the following municipalities: Boscoreale, Ercolano, Ottaviano, Terzigno, Torre Annunziata, Torre del Greco, Trecase.

Boscotrecase itself is divided into different districts:

- Annunziatella: takes its name from a small chapel dedicated to the Annunciation that already existed in the early 17th century. It is still the centre of the town, hosting almost all the public buildings and part of the commercial activities.
- Oratorio: takes its name from an oratory dedicated to the Nativity of the Blessed Virgin Mary, dating back to 1628. The church still exists with the name of Immaculate Conception.
- Torretta: takes its name from a 14th-century watchtower. The district has been populated since the Second World War, so it is the most modern in the town.
- Casavitelli: above the town, detached from the centre, takes its name from the Vitelli family, owners of lands where a small inhabited centre formed around the chapel dedicated to San Gennaro.

Boscotrecase lies below Vesuvius National Park. The park is characterized by maritime pines, prickly pears, brooms, and numerous types of orchids and epiphyllum which grow among greyish lava stones. Both the upper part of the town and the park support vineyards.

== Demographics ==
Registered inhabitants
Year	Pop.	±%
1861	5,238	—
1871	5,306	+1.3%
1881	5,874	+10.7%
1901	6,286	+7.0%
1911	6,847	+8.9%
1921	8,097	+18.3%
1931	9,125	+12.7%
1936	10,485	+14.9%
1951	12,603	+20.2%
1961	12,756	+1.2%
1971	12,215	−4.2%
1981	12,276	+0.5%
1991	11,295	−8.0%
2001	10,638	−5.8%
2011	10,416	−2.1%
2021	9,810	−5.8%

According to ISTAT, as of 31 December 2018, 289 foreign citizens were residing in Boscotrecase, corresponding to 2.8% of the population. The most represented nationalities were:

Country	Number	Fraction
Ukraine	137	1.3%
Romania	32	0.3%
Bulgaria	20	0.1%
Poland	17	0.1%

== Economy ==
As in the past, the main economic activities involve agriculture, wine production, and artisanal food processing. Several wineries produce the well-known Lacryma Christi wine. Other important activities include the artistic processing of lava stone and the artisan production of barrels. Barrel production is experiencing a period of low demand, which has led to the closure of some factories.

In the recent past, the tourism sector has become important. There are many restaurants and hotels on the slope of Vesuvius above town.

== Governance ==
The municipality has been governed by different officials: either a mayor or a commissioner.

Start	End	Name	Party	Title
13 December 1988	28 November 1989	Luigi Gianfrancesco	Christian Democracy	Mayor
28 November 1989	27 July 1990	Mario DePaola		Prefectural Commissioner
27 July 1990	10 March 1993	Vincent Bandino	Italian Socialist Party	Mayor
24 March 1993	12 August 1993	Nunziato Manzo	Italian Socialist Party	Mayor
12 June 1993	16 August 1993	Bruno Pettinato		Prefectural Commissioner
16 August 1993	22 November 1993	Bruno Pettinato		Special Commissioner
22 November 1993	17 November 1997	Agnes Borrelli	Independent	Mayor
17 November 1997	11 April 2002	Agnes Borrelli	The Olive Tree	Mayor
11 April 2002	7 May 2002	Rose Maria Machinè		Prefectural Commissioner
7 May 2002	28 May 2002	Rose Maria Machinè		Special Commissioner
28 May 2002	29 May 2007	Nunziato Manzo		Mayor
29 May 2007	8 May 2012	Agnes Borrelli		Mayor
8 May 2012	24 February 2016	Agnes Borrelli	Together	Mayor
24 February 2016	24 February 2016	Rose Maria Machinè		Prefectural Commissioner
24 February 2016	27 June 2016	Rose Maria Machinè		Special Commissioner
27 June 2016	5 October 2021	Peter Caroteneto	Free Boscotrecase	Mayor
5 October 2021	current	Peter Caroteneto	Free Boscotrecase	Mayor

== Culture ==
Theatre

- Archbishop Giuseppe Foglia parish theatre

Cinema

Boscotrecase served as a filming location for Two Cents Worth of Hope, a 1952 movie that won the Palme d'Or at the Cannes Film Festival. In the firm, the town took the name "Cusano". Many townspeople took part in the film. The Church of the Annunziatella, the former train station, and the country above the town appeared in the film.

Art

The frescoes found in the Villa of Agrippa Postumus are exhibited at the National Archaeological Museum of Naples and at the Metropolitan Museum of Art in New York City. Other objects, found in other excavation areas, are kept in the Museums of the Palace of Portici. Two paintings from 1749 by the Neapolitan painter Nicola Cacciapuoti are kept in the sacristy of the Ave Gratia Plena church. The artist Alberto Chiancone depicted farmhouses, countryside, and landscapes of the town in his paintings.

== Monuments and places of interest ==
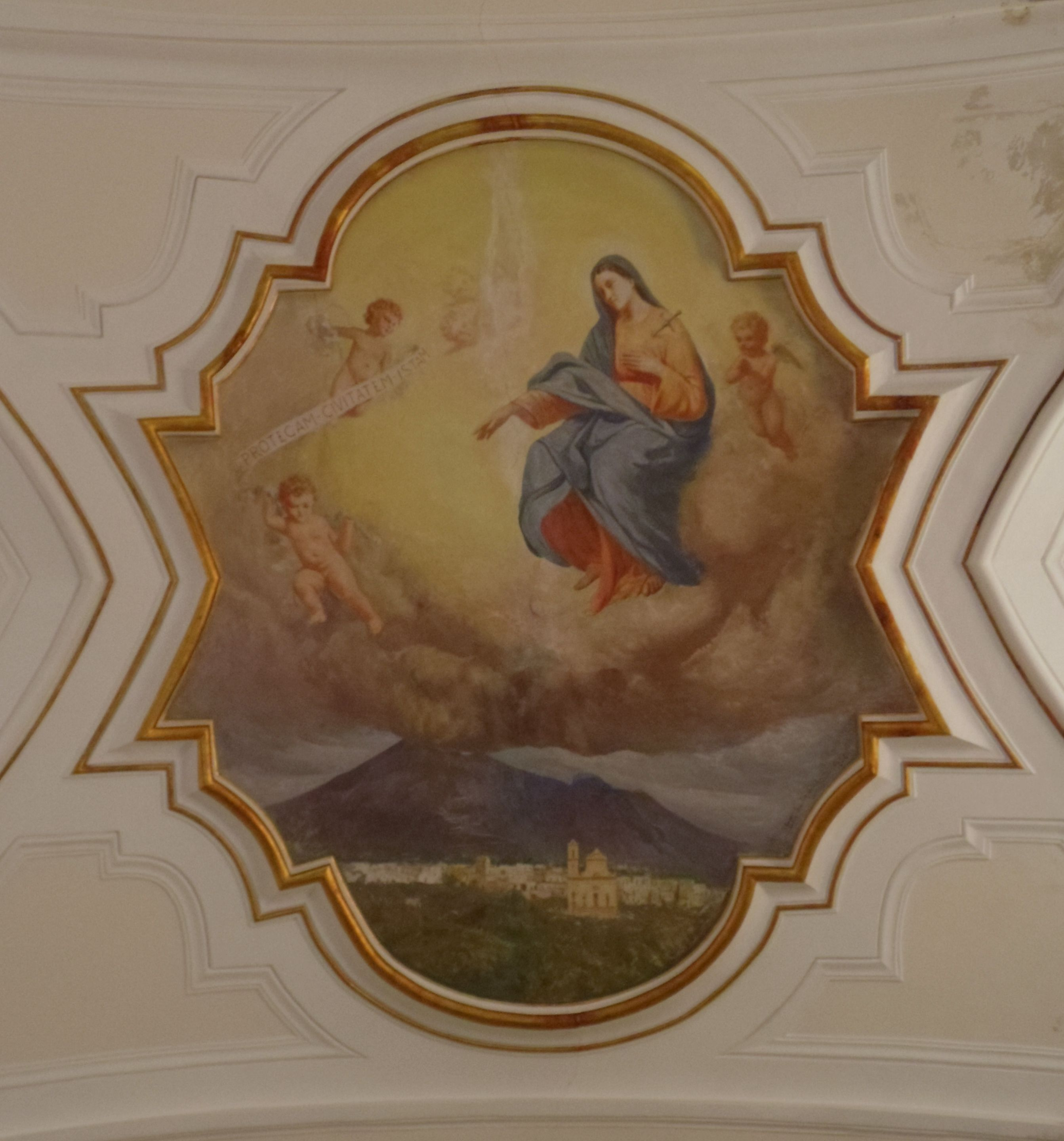
Our Lady of Sorrows protecting Boscotrecase from the ashes of Vesuvius (Church of Ave Gratia Plena)

=== Religious architecture ===
Catholic churches

- Church of Ave Gratia Plena (also known as L'Annunziatella)
- Church of Sant'Anna
- Palatine Chapel of San Gennaro
- Congregation of the Immaculate Conception
- Church of San Francesco d'Assisi (1913)
- Church of San Francesco di Sales (Founded in 1835, erected as a parish in 1916, closed for worship in 1962, collapsed in 1974)
- Church of Our Lady of Sorrows
- New Church of San Francesco de Sales

Non-Catholic churches

- Evangelical Lutheran Church (Via Matteotti)

Shrines

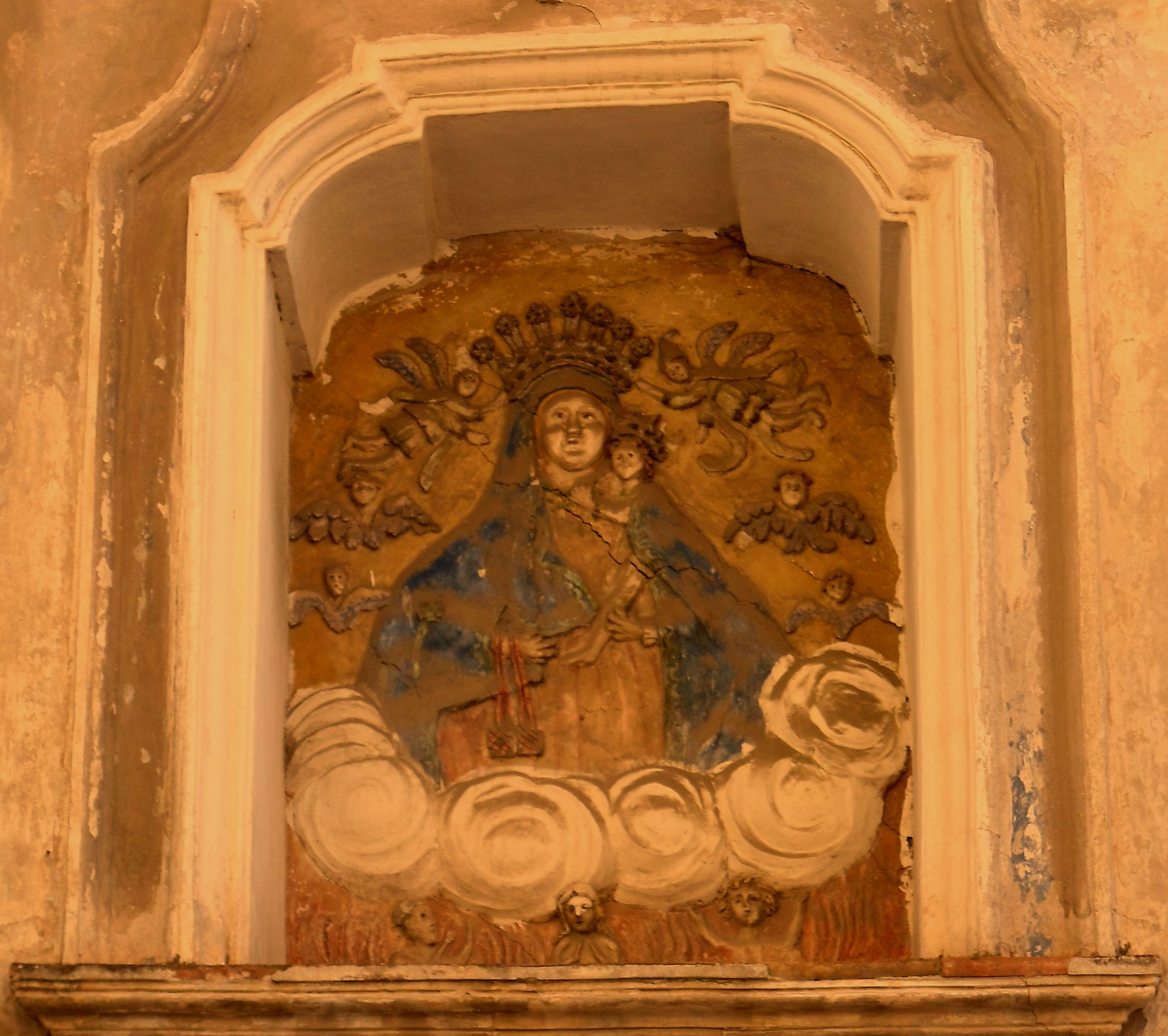
A shrine for the Madonna del Carmine

There are numerous votive shrines along the streets of the town. Most are present at the door of the houses, on the sides of the balconies, or in the stairways of the doorways. The oldest (and most numerous) are sacred images painted on majolica, the most recent are simple frescoes or high reliefs. Some of these were built in memory of some event:

- Shrine of the crucifix in memory of a Holy Mission (1871, Piazza Annunziatella)
- Shrine commemorating a mission of the Jesuit Fathers of 1924 (Via Salvo D'Acquisto)

=== Civil architecture ===
- Palazzo Amoruso (via Annunziatella n.140)
- Palazzo Aversa
- Palazzo Balzano
- Palazzo Casella
- Palazzo Andrea Collaro (Seat of the former Town Hall)
- Palazzo d'Amaro
- Palazzo Federico
- Palazzo Monticelli
- Villa Pelosio
- Palazzo Raiola (via Carlo Alberto n.11)
- Palazzo Rendina (via Carlo Alberto n.10)
- Villa Rota
- Villa Siena
- Palazzo Tedesco

=== Military architectures ===
- 14th-century watchtower (Turret)

=== Monuments ===
- Monument to the Fallen of the First World War (1924, Piazza Annunziatella, called O surdato by the people )
- Monument commemorating the centenary of the 1906 eruption

Tombstones

- Gravestone of the fallen of the Second World War
- Tombstone of Salvo D'Acquisto
- Tombstone of Cardinal Prisco

== Education ==
Public schools

- Pope John Paul II Primary School
- Cardinal Prisco State Middle School

Libraries

- Pino Grizzuti Municipal Library
- Franciscan Library, in the church of San Francesco d'Assisi.
