= Terzigno =

- Comune
- Comune di Terzigno
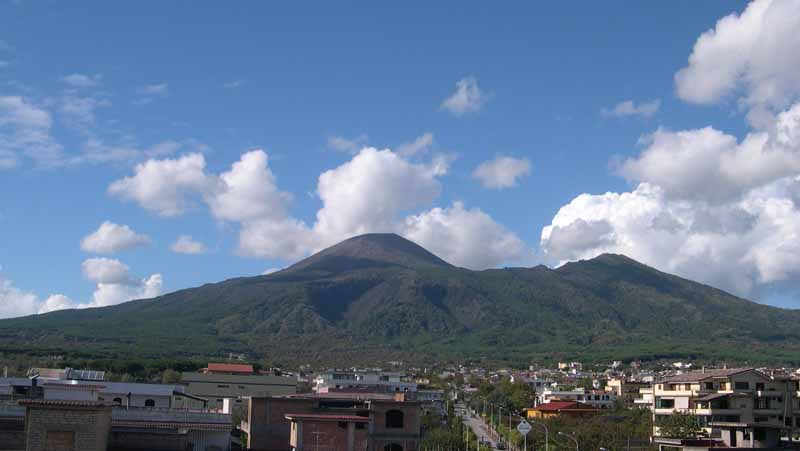

- Location within Italy Location within Campania
- Coordinates: 40°48′N 14°30′E
- Country: Italy
- Region: Campania
- Metropolitan city: Naples (NA)
- Frazioni: Boccia al Mauro

Government
  - Mayor: Francesco Ranieri

Area
  - Total: 23.5 km^{2} (9.1 sq mi)
- Elevation: 105 m (344 ft)

Population (Dec. 2004)
  - Total: 16,977
  - Density: 722/km^{2} (1,870/sq mi)
- Demonym: Terzignesi
- Time zone: UTC+1 (CET)
  - Summer (DST): UTC+2 (CEST)
- Postal code: 80040
- Dialing code: 081

Terzigno is a comune (municipality) in the Metropolitan City of Naples in the Italian region Campania, located about 20 km (12 mi) east of Naples. As of 31 December 2004, it had a population of 16,977 and an area of 23.5 km^{2} (9.1 sq mi).

The municipality of Terzigno contains the frazione (subdivision) Boccia al Mauro.

Terzigno borders the following municipalities: Boscoreale, Boscotrecase, Ottaviano, Poggiomarino, San Giuseppe Vesuviano.

== History ==
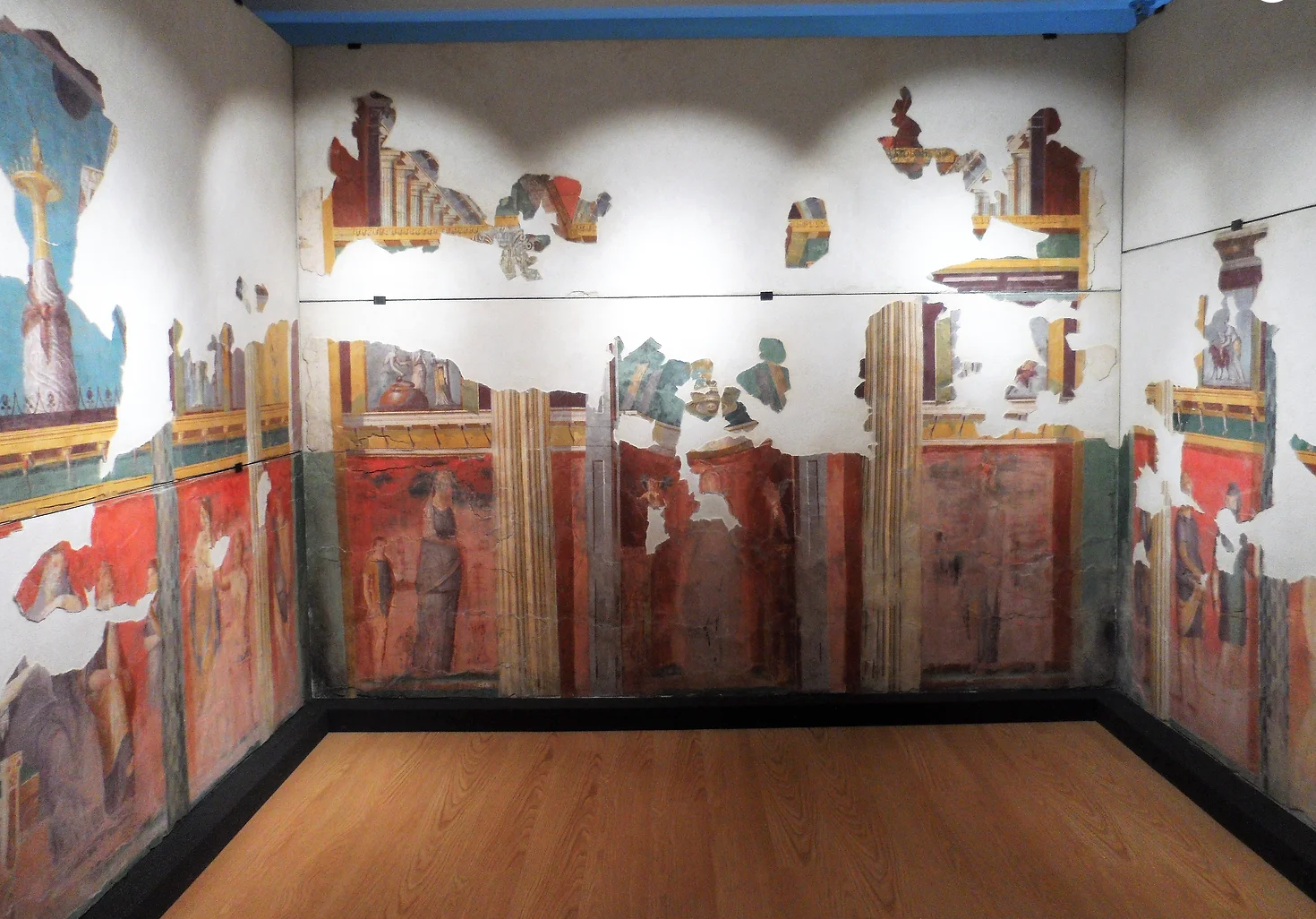
Villa 6 Triclinium

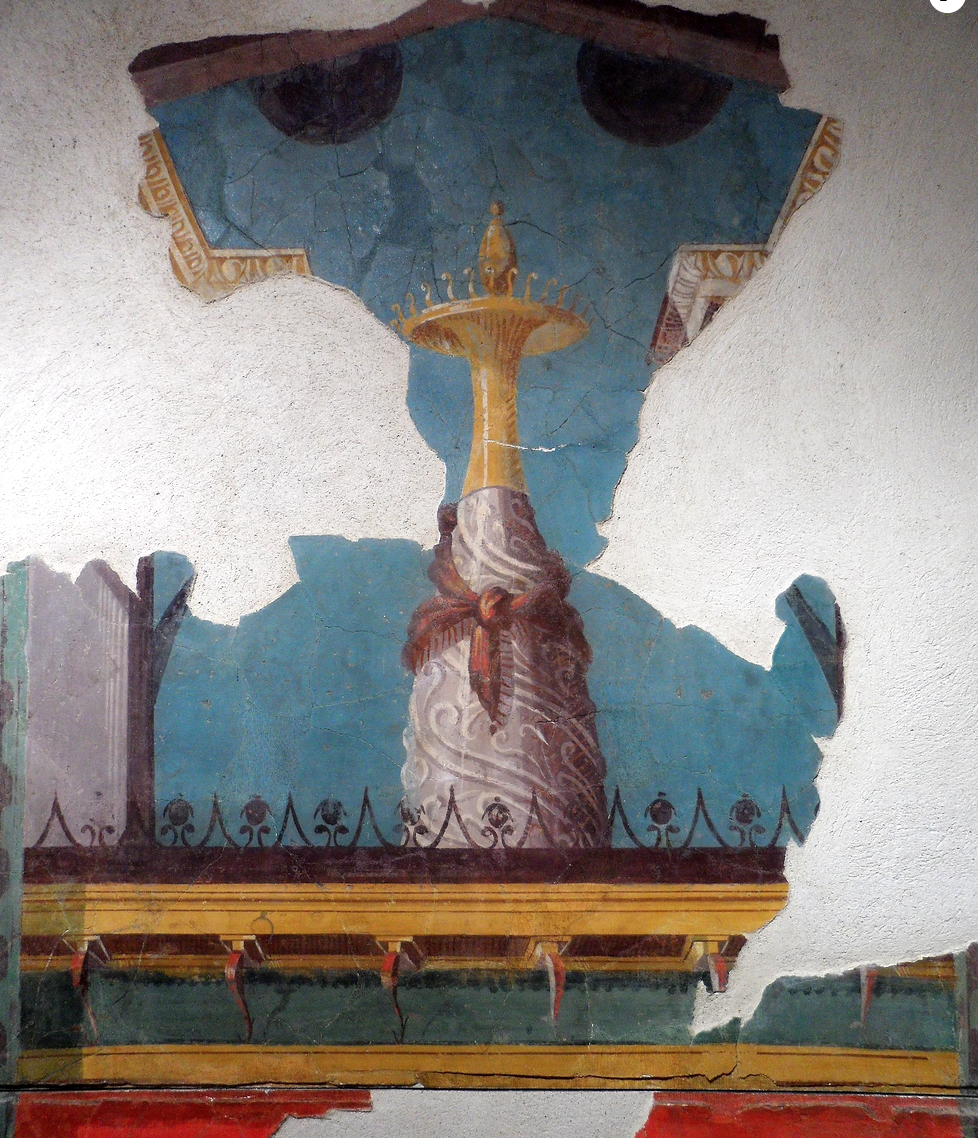
Villa 6 Triclinium

In Roman times Terzigno was a rural outlying suburb of Pompeii in which numerous aristocratic and rustic country villas were located and which were all buried and preserved beneath many metres of volcanic debris by the eruption of Mount Vesuvius in 79 AD.

Excavations at Terzigno began in 1983 with the unearthing of three villas and work has continued sporadically since. Exquisite frescoes were found and silver and gold objects including jewellery on five skeletons of people who failed to escape the eruption.

== The villas ==
Villa 6 is remarkable for its enormous and refined Second Style frescoes from a dining room representing mythological figures including Cybele and Attis as well as Paris and Helen at various ages. In its last phase an agricultural part of the complex was added focussed on a winery with a large threshing floor and a columned portico, adjacent lever press (torcularium) and dolia in a wine cellar. Outside the NE entrance to the villa skeletons of seven fugitives were found.

The Museo Archeologico Territoriale di Terzigno has frescoes and finds from these local villas.

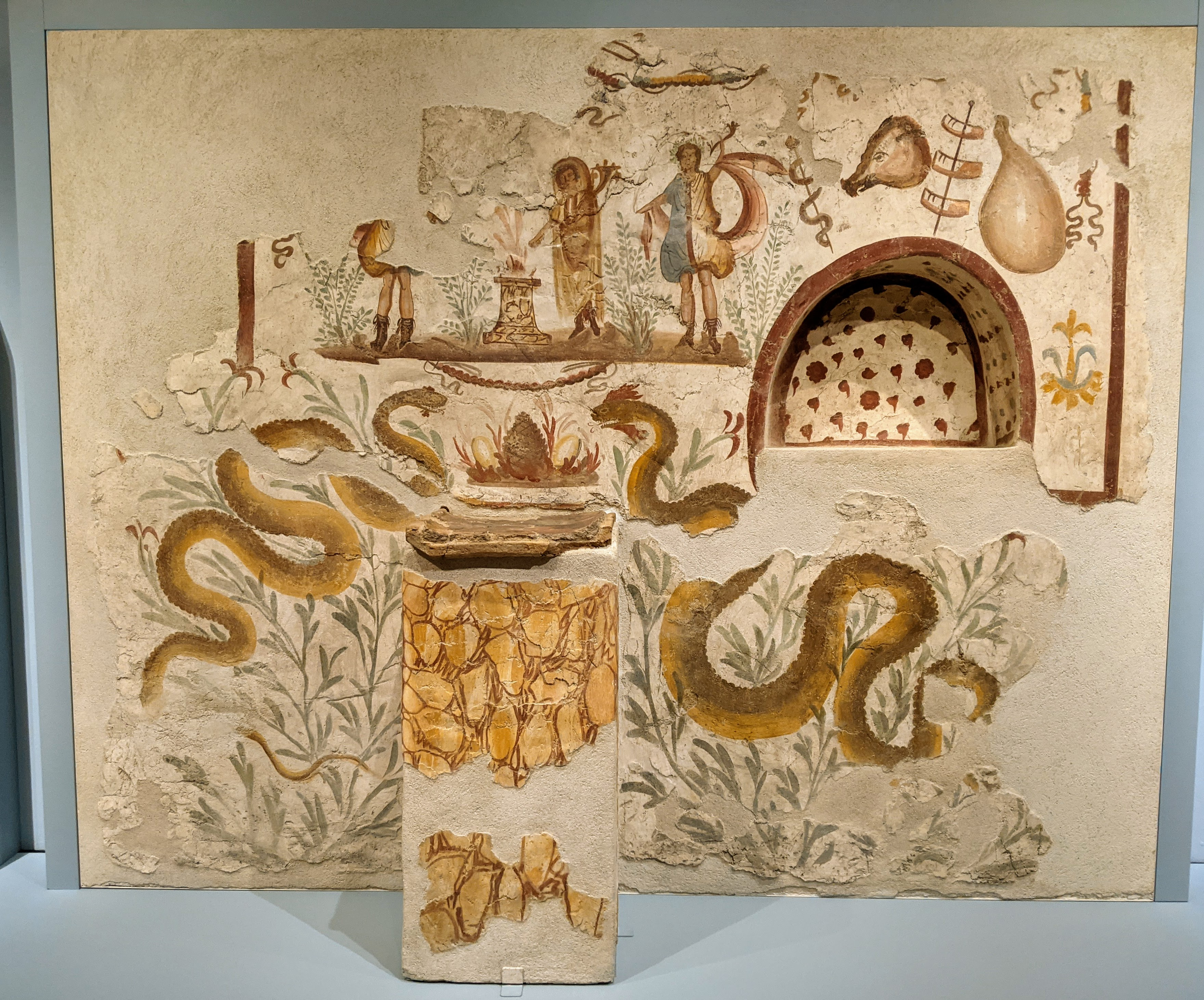
villa 6: Lararium (domestic shrine) with niche and altar

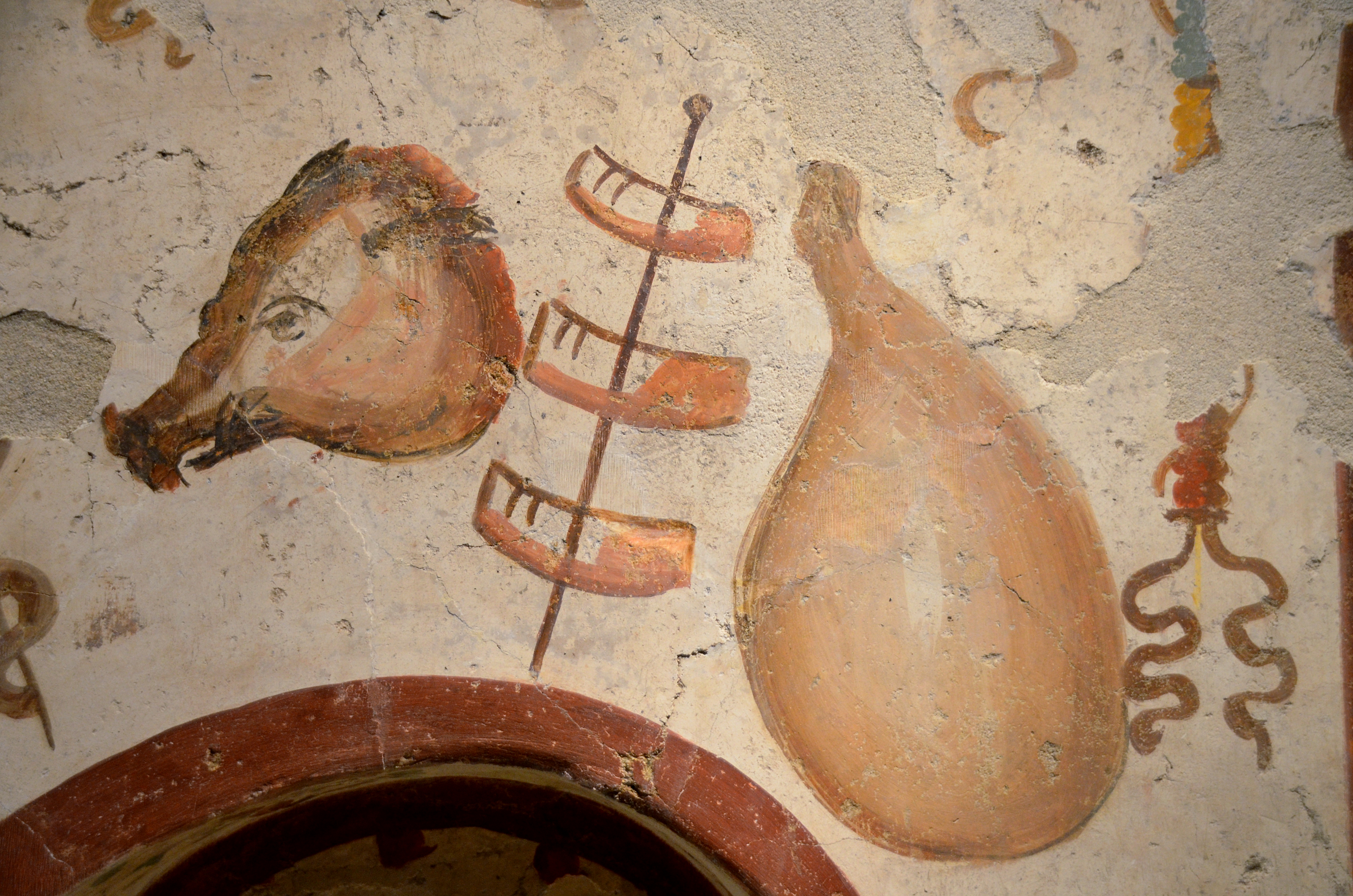
Detail of Lararium

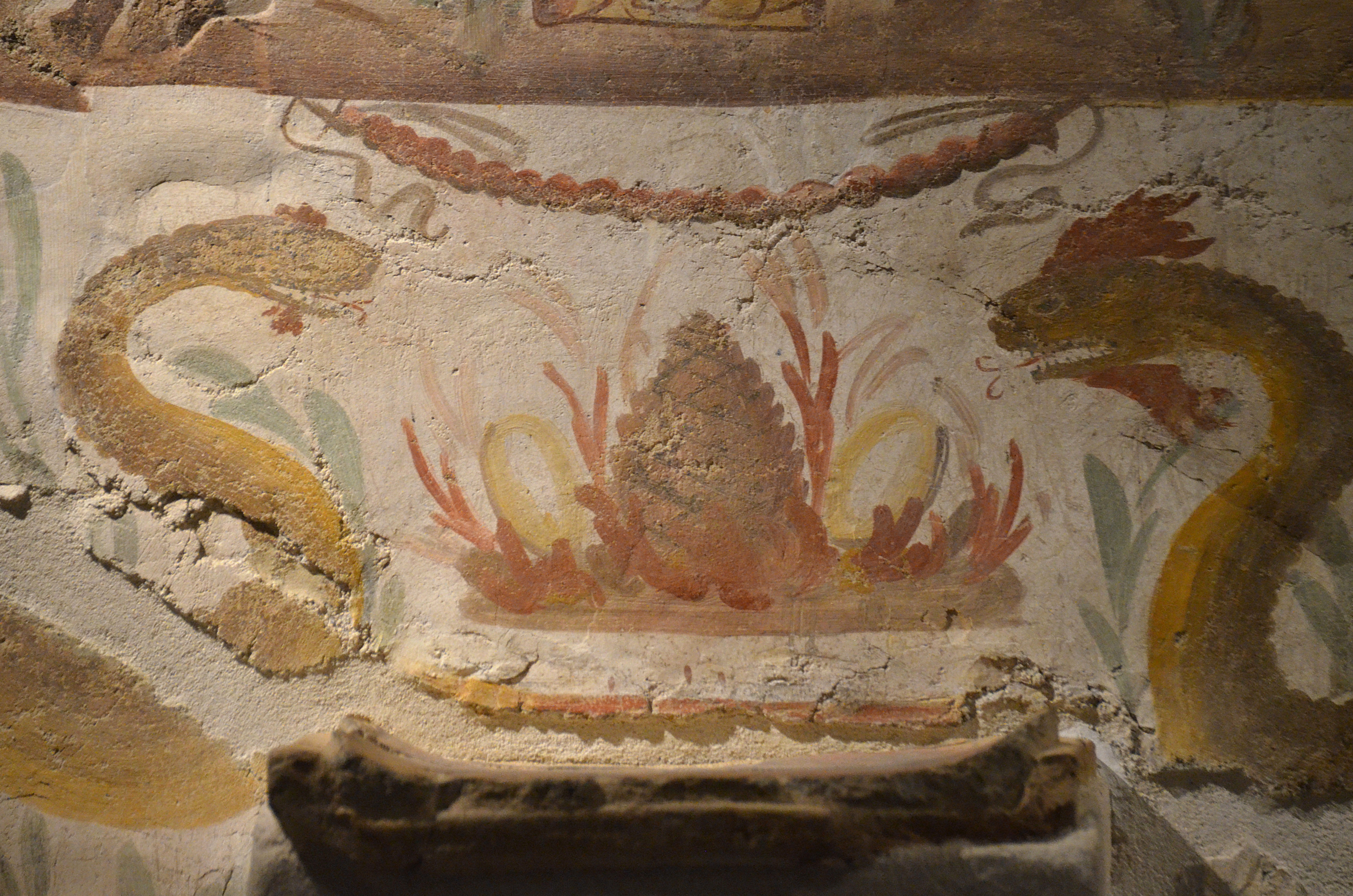
Detail of Lararium

Villa 1 of the 1st quarter of the 1st c. BC was in a particularly elegant residential neighbourhood but had a large wine cellar raised above ground level with 42 dolia and an area used for fodder storage and a threshing floor. The earthquake of 62 AD caused damage and restoration was still in progress at the time of the eruption, such as columns of the portico being rebuilt in brick.

Villa 2 of the late 2nd to early 1st century BC similarly had renovation work in progress and had a central courtyard with portico supported by brick pillars and columns on three sides. A large open area was probably a threshing floor. The skeletons of five people with gold jewellery, silverware and a hoard of republican and imperial silver coins were found here. The elegant workmanship of the silverware, together with the jewellery, denote their high social status. A wooden press (exactly as described by Cato) with a large dolium for collecting the must was near a wine cellar with twenty-four dolia buried in the floor which was raised above the adjacent courtyard.

== Demographic evolution ==
Historical population

Year	Pop.	±%
1861	2,423	—
1871	2,465	+1.7%
1881	3,914	+58.8%
1901	4,454	+13.8%
1911	5,023	+12.8%

Year	Pop.	±%
1921	5,211	+3.7%
1931	6,386	+22.5%
1936	7,040	+10.2%
1951	8,541	+21.3%
1961	10,160	+19.0%

Year	Pop.	±%
1971	10,947	+7.7%
1981	10,915	−0.3%
1991	13,653	+25.1%
2001	15,870	+16.2%

Source: Data from ISTAT
