= Villa of Agrippa Postumus =

Ancient Roman villa in Italy

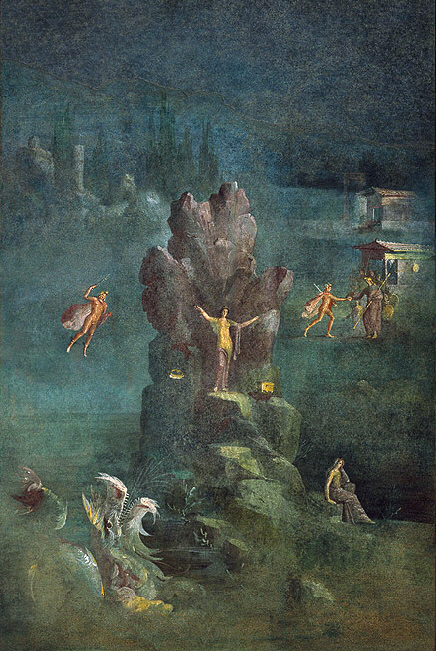
Painting of Perseus and Andromeda from the eastern wall of the Mythological Room

Agrippa Postumus, a grandson of the Emperor Augustus, had a villa on the slopes of Mount Vesuvius, which was buried in the eruption of 79 AD. The villa lies within the current comune of Boscotrecase, Campania, Italy. The villa is best known for its ancient Roman works of art, especially its frescoes. Because the ash from Mount Vesuvius's eruption preserved the frescoes, they were able to be excavated between 1903 and 1905. The frescoes come from various cubicula, or bedrooms that served as places of sociability and business, along the villa's southern hallway that overlooks the bay of Naples.

The frescoes that were excavated are now shared between the Metropolitan Museum of Art and the National Archaeological Museum of Naples. A fragment from the villa was discovered in the collection of the Harvard Art Museums in 2007, having been acquired in 1921 from Albert Gallatin.

== History ==
It is commonly accepted that the villa itself was built between 21 and 16 BC. The excavation of the villa uncovered a roof tile inscribed "Papillus Agrippae Tuberi Fabio consulibus." It is from this tile that 11 BC. is commonly accepted as the date of the cubicula's decorations since Tuberones and Fabius, two of the names inscribed on this tile, were consuls in 11 BC. The question surrounding the paintings, however, is who commissioned them since Agrippa, the supposed builder and owner of the villa, died in 12 BC, leaving the villa to his infant son, Agrippa Postumus. Some scholars such as Umberto Pappalardo argue that Julia would have been in charge of the villa after her husband's death since as an infant Agrippa Postumus could not take on the responsibilities of maintaining the villa as Agrippa's heir. The inscription "Caesaris Augusti femina mater erat" carved on a column shaft alludes to Julia. Many aristocratic women owned and managed villa properties in the Bay of Naples, so it would not have been uncommon for Julia to be the villa's proprietor when her son was not of age. While Julia is often seen as the patron of the cubicula's paintings, Elfriede Knauer presents the possibility that Agrippa commissioned the rooms’ decorations while he was governing in the eastern Roman provinces.

Augustus is also often associated with having control over and ownership of the villa. When Agrippa died, Augustus became the owner of many of Agrippa's properties. Augustus's will also supports the claim that he had some ownership of the villa. Augustus's will stated that he would give any inheritances he received from any man to the child of the deceased if they were of age. If the child was not of age, Augustus would hold onto the property until the child finally reached adulthood or got married. Similarly, Dio discusses Agrippa Postumus's anger at Augustus for not giving him his rightful inheritance as Agrippa's son and heir, which would have included the villa at Boscotrecase.

The villa was passed down through the imperial family. John D'Arms suggests that Tiberius became the owner of the villa upon Agrippa Postumus's death. While Tacitus does mention in his Annals that Tiberius conducted business in a villa that overlooked a cliff, he does not specify which villa Tiberius used, leaving D'Arms's argument regarding Tiberius's ownership of the villa up for debate. It is, however, commonly accepted that the last owner and administrator of the villa was Euthyeus, a freedman of Claudius, since bronze seals inscribed with the name "Tiberius Claudius Eutychi Caesaris Liberati" were discovered during the villa's excavation.

== Frescoes ==
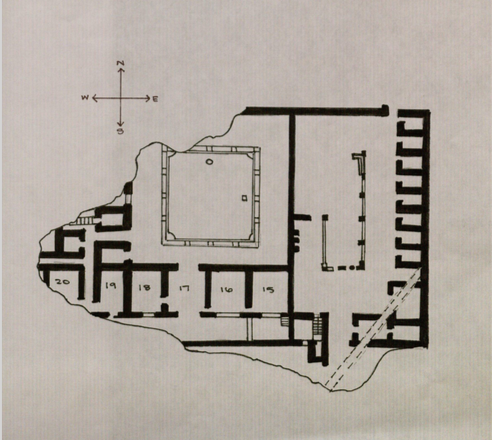
Floor plan of the villa. The cubicula where the frescoes were originally located are labeled.

In 1922, archaeologist Matteo Della Corte published a report about the villa including a partial floor plan. The residential area of the villa was designated to the left, oriented around the central peristyle. The slaves, horses, and farming equipment were on the right side in a separate court. A tile in the slave quarters dates it to 2 BC, the year of Julia's exile and when an overseer would have taken over the villa from the imperial family.

The surviving frescoes come from four cubicula along the villa's southern hallway around the villa's central peristyle, where social and business activities occurred. The paintings are from cubiculum 15, 16, and 19, also known as the Black Room, the Red Room, and the Mythological Room, respectively, for the paintings that were in those specific rooms. A few panels were also excavated from cubiculum 20, or the White Room.

It is speculated that the Black Room and the Red Room possibly served as triclinia, or dining rooms. The Mythological Room and the White Room were most likely cubicula, which served as places for rest. Artifacts found around the Black Room suggest that a later owner utilized it for agrarian purposes, most likely as a storage room. The proximity of the room to the terrace, which connected the residential area to the slave quarters, would have made it ideal for storage.

The villa's frescoes fall into the Pompeian Third Style of wall-paintings which were created during the imperial rule of Augustus. Key characteristics of the Third Style found in the villa were Egyptian imagery, mythological scenery, and intricate ornamentation.

The materials of the rooms explain the gap between when the villa was built and when the cubicula were decorated. The walls were made of soluble sand- and marble-dust plaster, which meant that paint could be applied anytime after the final layer of plaster was applied as long as the plaster remained slightly damp.

=== The Black Room ===
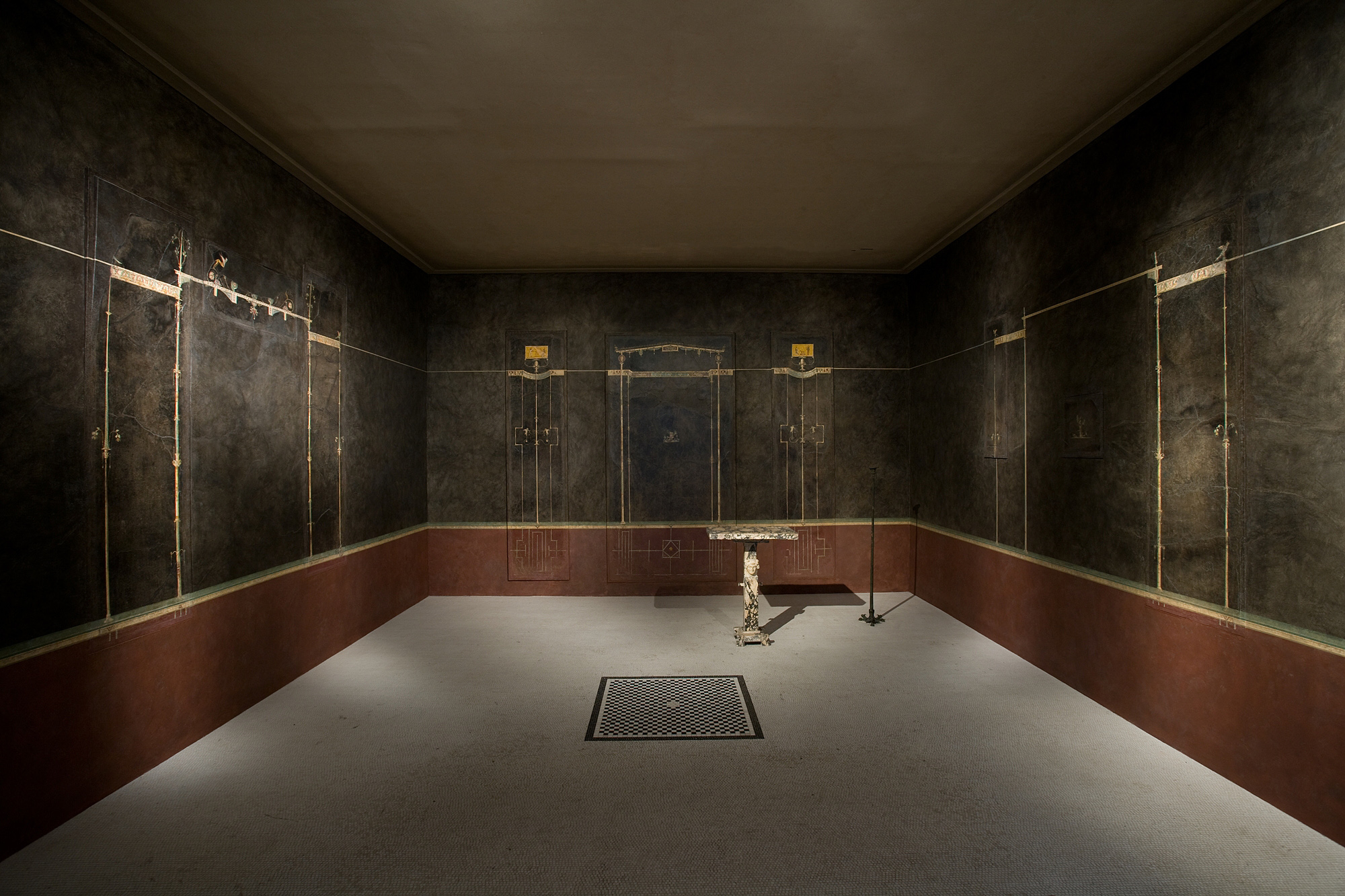
Wall paintings showing a small landscape and a rendering of what the floor would have looked like. From Metropolitan Museum of Art, New York. last decade of the 1st century BCE

Located at the east end of the hallway, the Black Room, cubiculum 15, had a doorway in the south wall leading to a terrace with a view of the sea. In the fresco on the northern wall opposite the doorway, thin columns support a pavilion structure. Portrait medallions of either Agrippa and another male member of the imperial family or Julia and Livia sit at the top of the columns supporting the pavilion's roof. In between the pavilion's columns floats a sacro-idyllic landscape of a small building with a porch decorated with garlands, grapes, and patrea. On either side of the pavilion are two candelabras. In the middle of each candelabra, two swans, symbols of Apollo, Augustus's patron god, hold fillets in their beaks while perching on protruding spirals. At the top of each candelabra is a yellow framed picture, or pinakes, of Egyptian deities, such as Isis, and symbols of the crocodile god Sobek, Hathor, or Apis, with leaders worshipping them. The pinakes on the right candelabrum show a ruler kneeling and offering an olive branch, a symbol of peace, to the shrine of Amubis. Some argue that these pinakes show Agrippa and Julia in the guise of the Egyptian leader and Isis.

The pinakes share stylistic similarities with Egyptian funerary illustrations, and similar iconography is echoed in both. The Sobek pinake was most likely replicated iconography in the other cubiculum in either the dados or upper walls. Matteo Della Corte's commissioned drawings of the frescoes show that the Sobek icons were mirrored, suggesting that a pattern-book was used in the creation of the Egyptian figures.

The eastern and western walls were mirror images of one another, decorated with candelabra, a pavilion-like structure known as an aedicula, and sacro-idyllic landscapes in the open space of the central aedicula. The landscape on the eastern wall contains a gate supporting a statue, a porch decorated with a goat's head, a woman and child entering the area, and a shepherd. The western wall's landscape is similar to the one on the northern wall detailed above.

The floor of the Black Room was made up of black and white mosaic tiles. The mosaic on the floor did not survive, though its dimensions were recreated by the Metropolitan Museum of Art. Della Corte's plan of the villa showed nine white hexagons that created a 92 centimeter square in the center of the floor. Black tesserae and white mosaic tiles support the idea that this room was used as a triclinia for dining and entertainment purposes. A couch would have been placed in the room that would allow for guests to view only one wall painting at a time from a lower perspective.

=== The Red Room ===
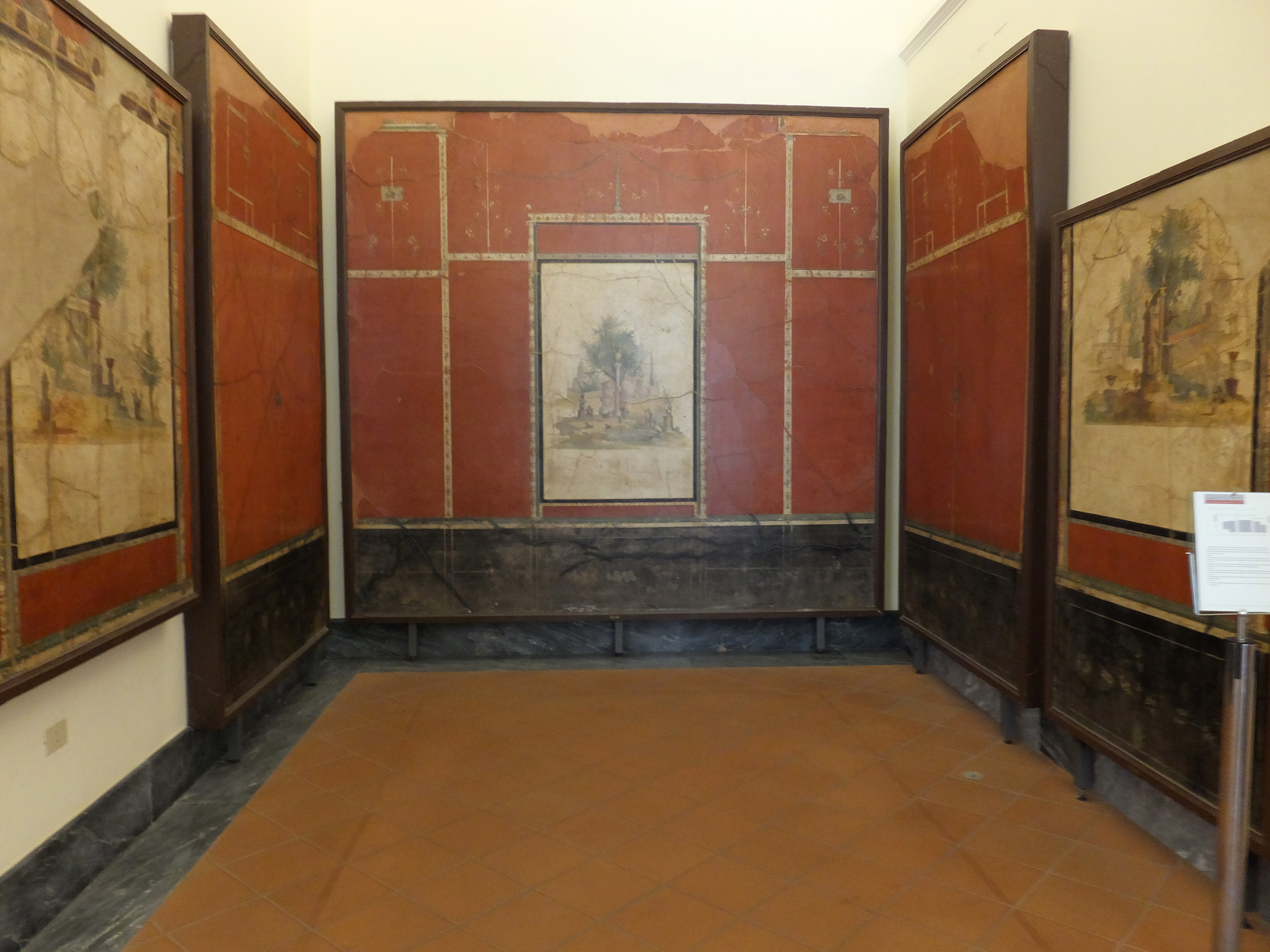
Red Room in the villa. National Archaeological Museum, Naples

The Red Room, cubiculum 16, like its eastern neighbor the Black Room, had a southern entryway that led to the southern terrace of the villa. Also similar to its neighbor, the walls of the Red Room were decorated with aedicula and sacro-idyllic landscapes.

The fresco on the northern wall is a large sacro-idyllic landscape of a tomb with an altar and statue of a seated deity floating on a white background. This sacred scene takes up the majority of the central aedicula and has more iconic columns and entablatures flanking it on both sides. Two ibises perch at the corners of the central aedicula. In the upper portion of the northern fresco, various plants, including ivy and oleander shrubs sprout from thin shafts sitting on the entablatures, and a flower candelabrum and its shafts fall in organized and symmetrical curves. The upper right- and left-hand corners of the fresco include two lectern boxes. On the black dado, figs lie beneath the sacro-idyllic landscapes.

In the center of the eastern and western walls are two more large sacro-idyllic landscapes on white backgrounds surrounded by iconic columns. The eastern wall's landscape includes a semi-circular wall decorated with statuettes, vases, a tree with a shield and cone on it, a building complex and cliffs in the background, and a priestess, shepherd, and traveler. The western landscape contains a tree surrounded by four columns, a tetrastylon, decorated with a goat's head, a fountain, three statues, and a temple with rocks in the background.

=== The Mythological Room ===
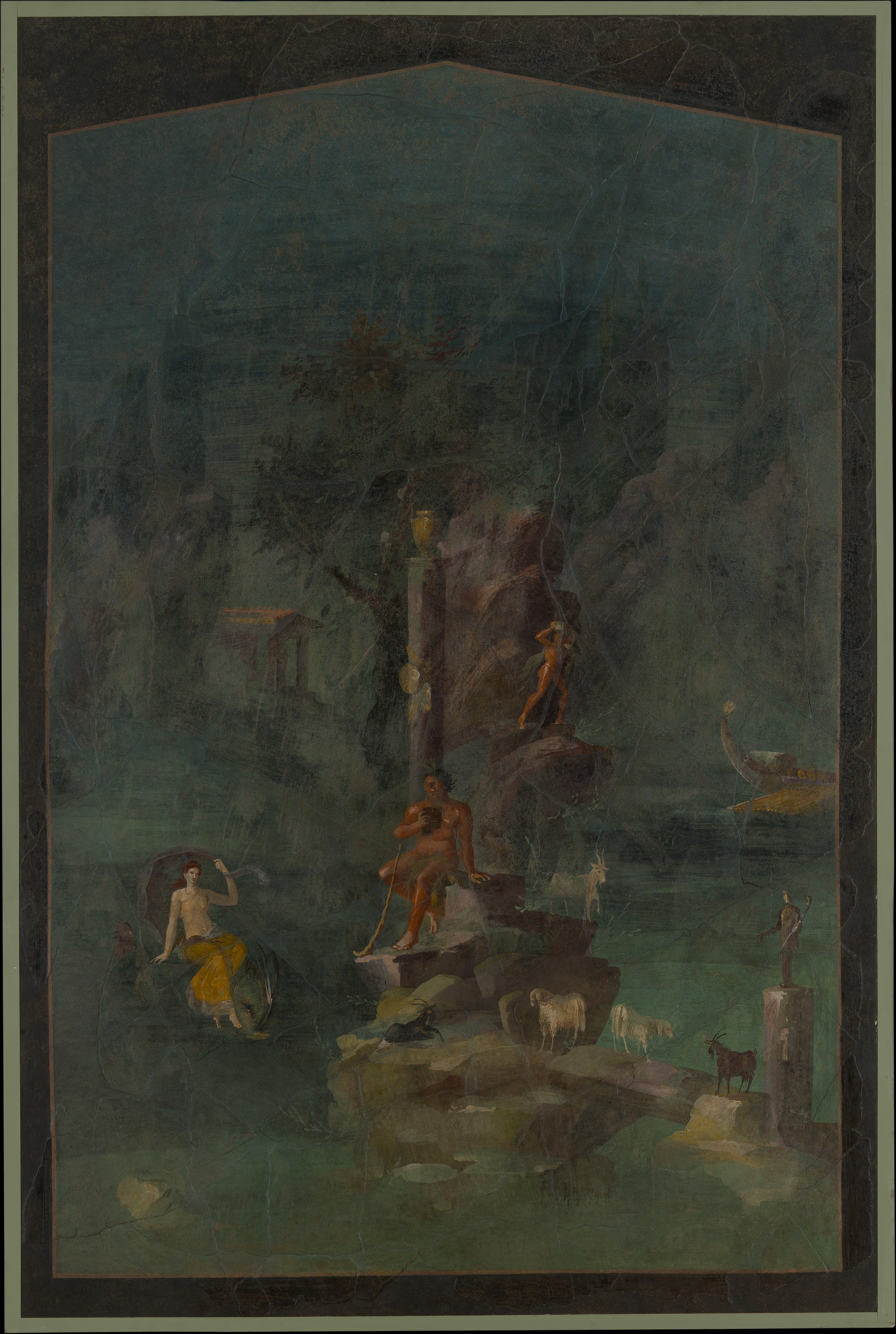
Painting of Polyphemus and Galatea from the west wall of the Mythological Room. Metropolitan Museum of Art, New York. last decade of the 1st century BCE

On the west side of room 17, which connected the central peristyle of the villa to the southern terrace, was the Mythological Room, cubiculum 19. Two mythological scenes survive from this room: Polyphemus and Galatea on the center of the western wall and Perseus and Andromeda on the center of the eastern wall. Both mythological scenes show multiple scenes from each story simultaneously. In the scene of Polyphemus and Galatea, Polyphemus admires Galatea from a rock while attending his goats in the foreground while in the background, Polyphemus throws rocks at Odysseus's boat. In the scene of Perseus and Andromeda, Perseus flies to the rock where Andromeda is chained in order to rescue her, and in the background, Perseus asks Andromeda's father, Cepheus, for her hand in marriage.

The remainder of the room was painted red and decorated with thin candelabras. These candelabras contain two Sirens at the center holding swags that are connected to columns at the sides of the panel. Above the candelabra is a yellow frieze containing Egyptian-themed images, including deities, griffins, and comic masks, in small black-background shapes. Similar panels with this type of decoration flanked the two mythological paintings on the east and west walls of the room.

=== The White Room ===
This room, cubiculum 20, is situated left of the Mythological Room. Both rooms had entryways that led to a shared corridor between them. The White Room was only partially excavated, leaving behind two fragmented images of candelabra. The thin candelabras have garlands, flowers, twigs, and leaves sprouting from them in symmetrical curves and spirals. The candelabra sit on a black dado decorated with a bird and some berries in the panels that survive. Thymiateria which burned incense were placed on both sides of the room's southern entrance.

== Discovery ==
This large villa was accidentally discovered during the construction of the Circumvesuviana railway line in 1903. The landowner, Cavaliere Ernesto Santini, excavated the villa with the help of the Italian archaeologist, Matteo Della Corte, from 1903 to 1905. However, an eruption of Mount Vesuvius in April 1906, reburied the villa, preventing a complete excavation of the villa.
