= Trecase =

Trecase Treccase (Neapolitan)
- Comune
- Comune di Trecase
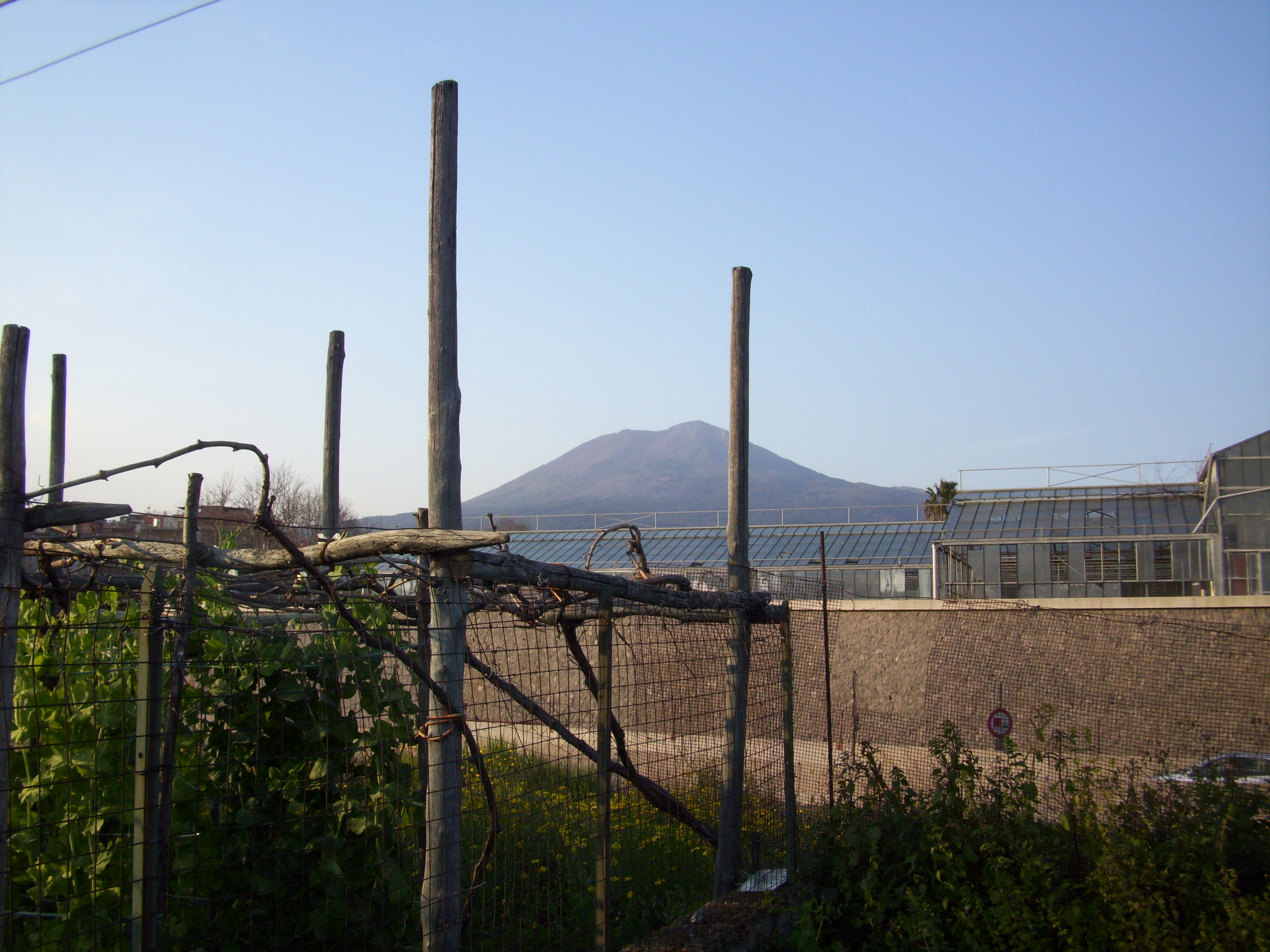

- Location within Italy Location within Campania
- Coordinates: 40°46′N 14°26′E
- Country: Italy
- Region: Campania
- Metropolitan city: Naples (NA)

Government
  - Mayor: Raffaele De Luca

Area
  - Total: 6.1 km^{2} (2.4 sq mi)
- Elevation: 99 m (325 ft)

Population (31 December 2014)
  - Total: 9,094
  - Density: 1,500/km^{2} (3,900/sq mi)
- Demonym: Trecasesi
- Time zone: UTC+1 (CET)
  - Summer (DST): UTC+2 (CEST)
- Postal code: 80040
- Dialing code: 081

Trecase (Italian: [tre(k)ˈkaːse, -aːze]; Neapolitan: Treccase; "Three Houses") is a comune (municipality) in the Metropolitan City of Naples in the Italian region of Campania, located about 15 kilometres (9.3 mi) southeast of Naples.

Trecase borders the following municipalities: Boscotrecase, Ercolano, Ottaviano, Torre Annunziata, Torre del Greco.
