= Boscoreale =

Boscoreale Vuoscoriale (Neapolitan)
- Comune
- Comune di Boscoreale
- Municipal park

- Coat of arms

- Location within Italy Location within Campania
- Coordinates: 40°46′N 14°29′E
- Country: Italy
- Region: Campania
- Metropolitan city: Naples (NA)
- Frazioni: Cangiani, Marchesa, Marra, Passanti, Pellegrini

Government
  - Mayor: Di Lauro Pasquale

Area
  - Total: 11.28 km^{2} (4.36 sq mi)
- Elevation: 65 m (213 ft)

Population (31 December 2022)
  - Total: 25,939
  - Density: 2,300/km^{2} (5,956/sq mi)
- Demonym: Boschesi
- Time zone: UTC+1 (CET)
  - Summer (DST): UTC+2 (CEST)
- Postal code: 80041
- Dialing code: 081
- Saint day: 16 July
- Website: Official website

Boscoreale (Italian: [ˌbɔskoreˈaːle]; Neapolitan: Vuoscoriale; "Royal Grove") is an Italian comune (municipality) and town in the Metropolitan City of Naples, Campania, with a population of 25,939 in 2022. Located in the Vesuvius National Park, under the slopes of Mount Vesuvius, it is known for the fruit and vineyards of Lacryma Christi del Vesuvio. There is also a fine Vesuvian lava stone production.

== History ==
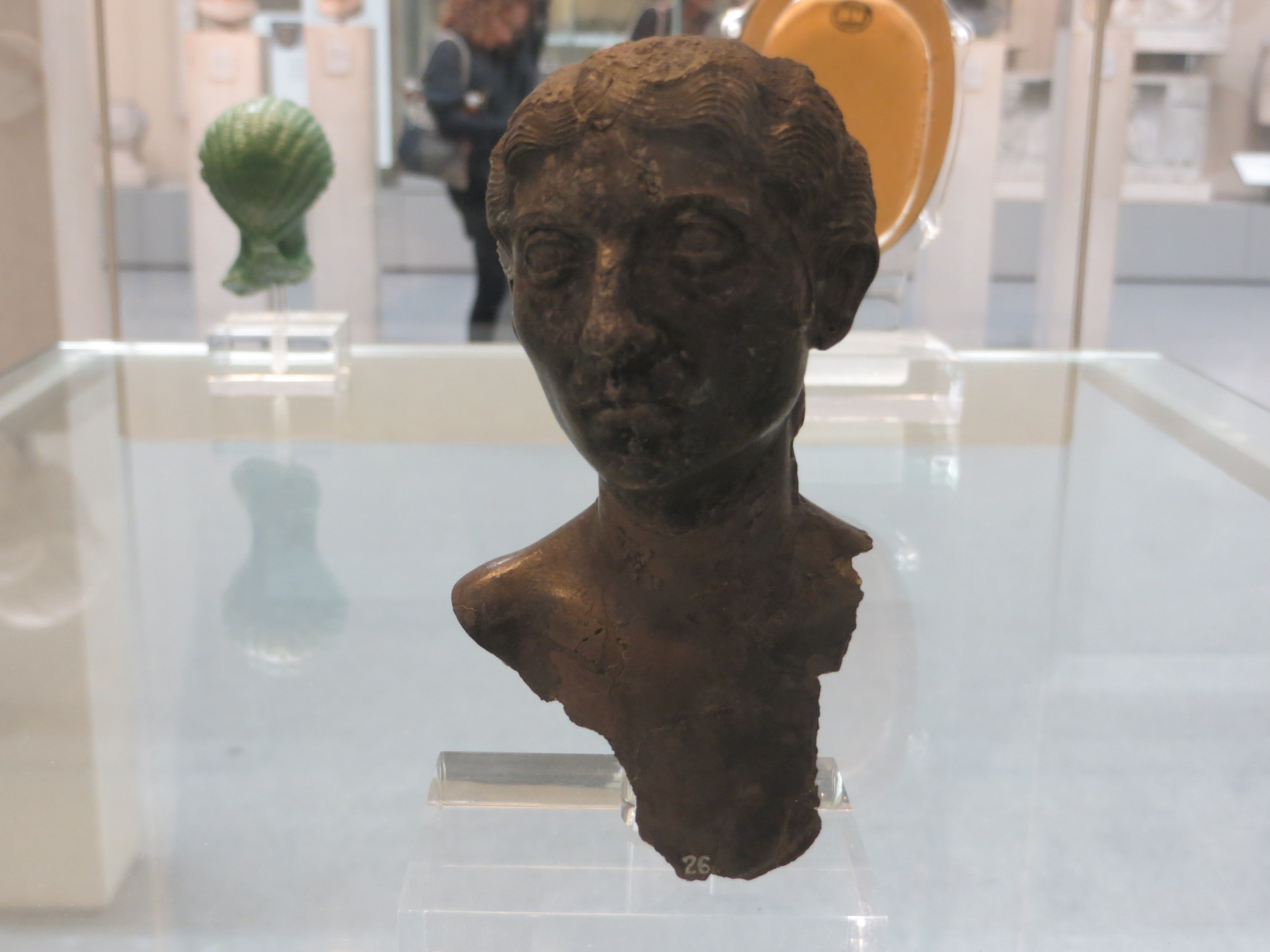
Female bust from the 1st century Boscoreale Treasure on display in the British Museum.

The neighbourhood of Monte Bursaccio which was overcome by the eruption of Vesuvius in 79 AD that obliterated and preserved its better-known neighbours, Pompeii and Herculaneum, is famous for the frescoes of its aristocratic villas, excavated before World War I. A hoard of Roman silver and coins that had been hurriedly stashed in a cistern for protection at the time of the eruption was also recovered in Boscoreale in 1895, and divided among several museums, including the Louvre and the British Museum.

Boscoreale, about a kilometre north of Pompeii of which it was an expansive, more rural outlying suburb, was notable in antiquity for having numerous aristocratic country villas and was preserved as a hunting park – hence its name, meaning "Royal Grove" – by the kings of Naples.

The villa of P. Fannius Synistor (see Villa Boscoreale) was built and decorated shortly after mid-first century BC. The quality of its frescoes seems to have preserved them from changes in fashion, before the villa was entombed in the eruption.

The Antiquarium of Boscoreale was founded in 1991 by the Soprintendenza archeologica di Pompei thanks to the finds from Pompeii, Herculaneum, Oplontis, Stabiae, Terzigno, and Boscoreale and to a didactic apparatus.

The neighbouring Boscotrecase yielded some elite works of art to excavators at the same time, in particular at the Villa of Agrippa Postumus, also known as the Imperial Villa or the Villa of Augusta.

== Geography ==
The municipality is part of Naples metropolitan area, and borders with Boscotrecase, Poggiomarino, Pompei, Scafati (SA), Terzigno, and Torre Annunziata. It counts the hamlets (frazioni) of Cangiani, Marchesa, Marra, Passanti, and Pellegrini.

== See also ==
- Boscoreale Treasure

== Sources ==
- Baratte, François (1986). Le Trésor d'orfèvrerie romaine de Boscoreale. Paris: Musée de Louvre. ISBN 2-7118-2048-3.
