= Pompeian Styles =

Artistic styles found in Pompeii

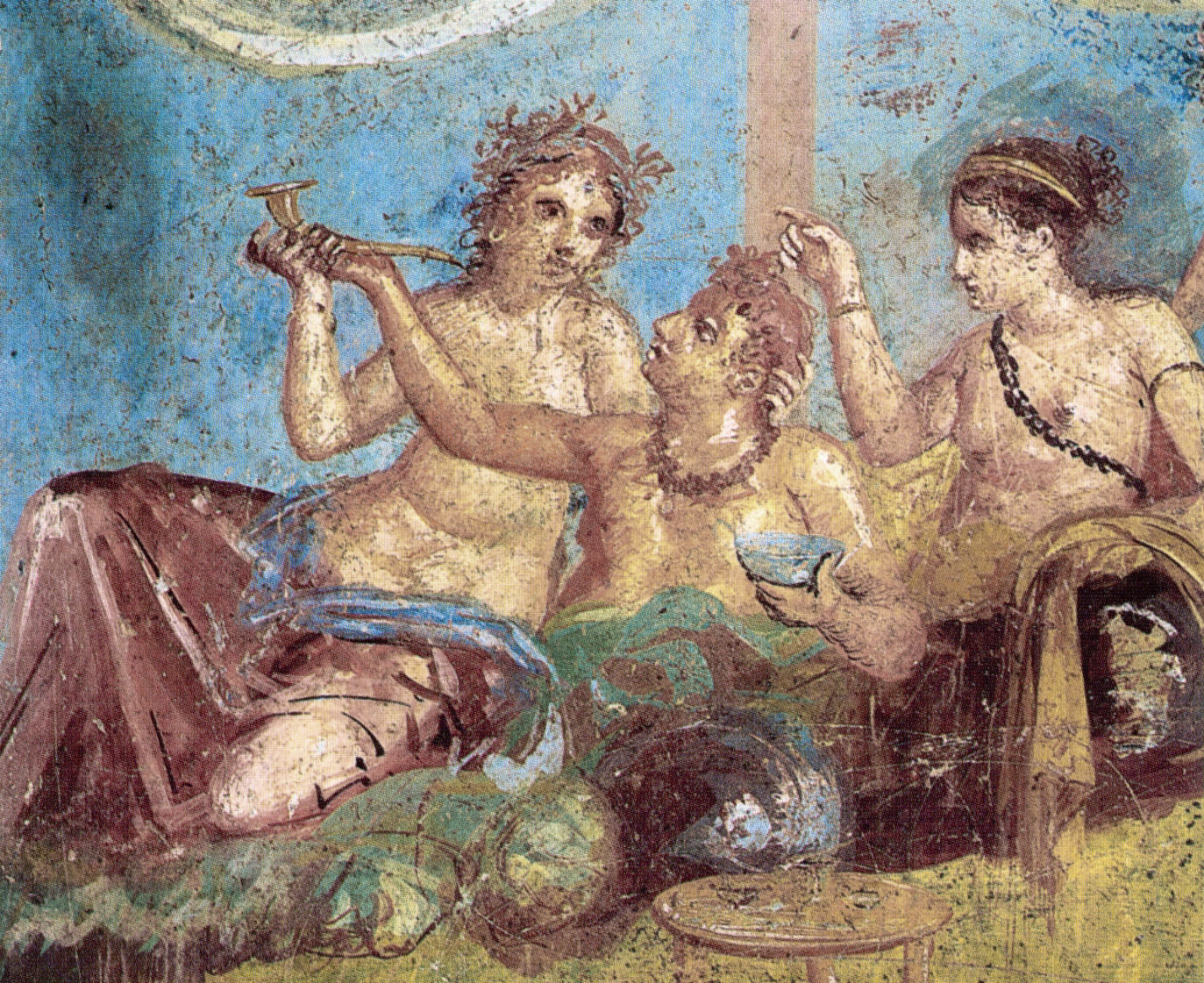
Roman fresco with a banquet scene from the Casa dei Casti Amanti, Pompeii

The Pompeian Styles are four periods which are distinguished in ancient Roman mural painting. They were originally delineated and described by the German archaeologist August Mau (1840–1909) from the excavation of wall paintings at Pompeii, which is one of the largest groups of surviving Roman frescoes.

The wall painting styles have allowed art historians to delineate phases of interior decoration leading up to the eruption of Mount Vesuvius in 79 AD between stylistic shifts in Roman art during late Republican and Augustan periods.

The four main styles of Roman wall painting defined are: structural (or incrustation), architectural, ornamental, and intricate. Each style following the first contains aspects of the previous styles. The first two styles (incrustation and architectural) were from the Republican period (related to Hellenistic Greek wall painting) and the last two (ornamental and intricate) from the Imperial period.

== History ==
Roman wall paintings have been found in buildings, private homes and villas across the Roman empire. Many of the first paintings discovered were around the Bay of Naples, the area in which Mount Vesuvius had erupted. The paintings sometimes contained depictions of life in this area prior to the great eruption that destroyed much of the countryside and the cities of Pompeii and Herculaneum.

Typically paintings were frescoes painted on plaster while it was drying.

In the first century BC different styles of paintings developed. These paintings ranged from being realistic to impressionist works of art. Inspiration came from mythology, landscapes, and other interests.

=== First Style: Incrustation ===
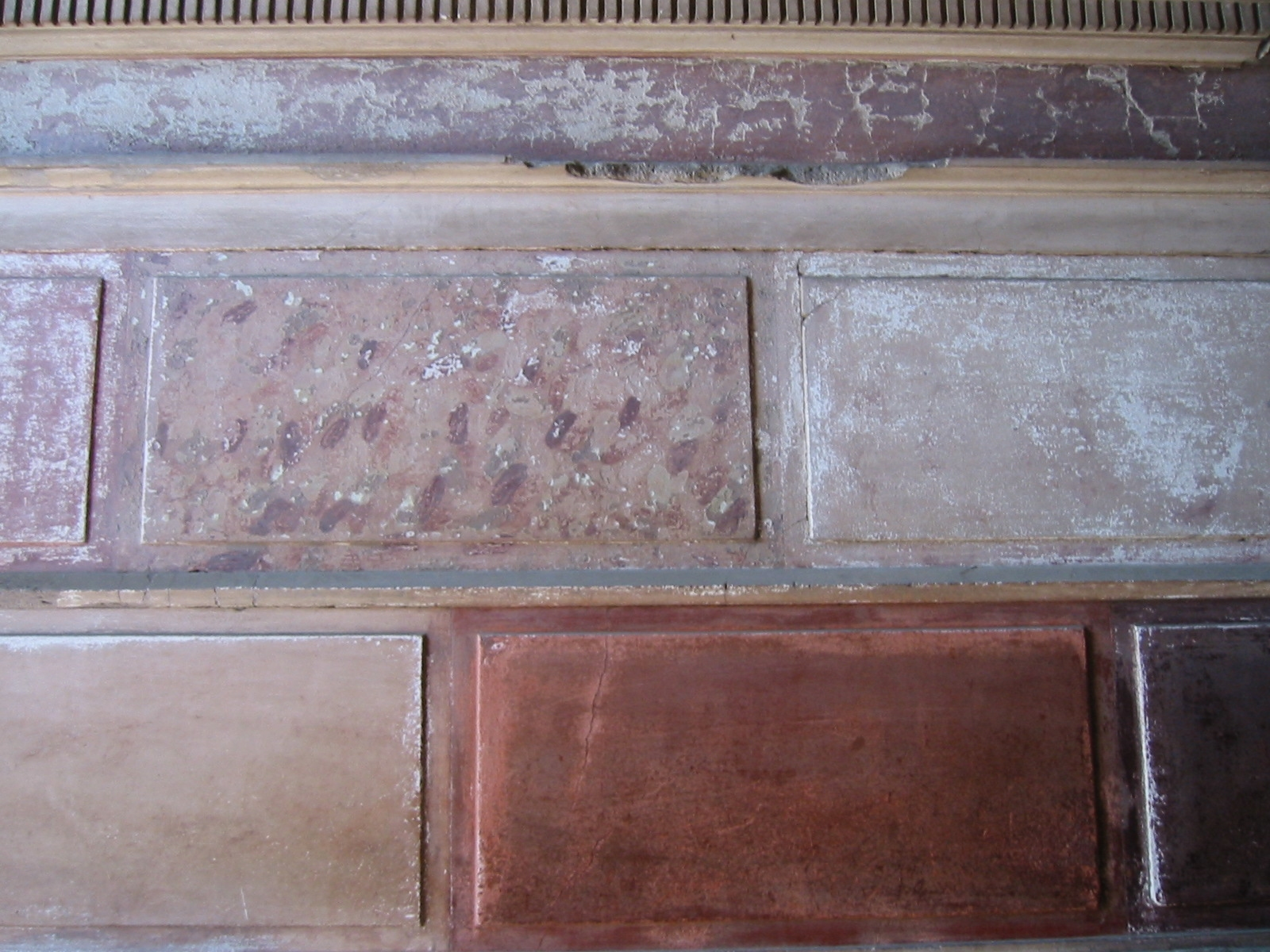
Fresco in the First style, in the Samnite House at Herculaneum

The First style, also referred to as structural, incrustation or masonry style, is traditionally dated to 200 BC until 80 BC but outside of Pompeii already existed much earlier, since the late 5th century BC. It is characterized by the trompe-l'œil simulation of marble (marble veneering). The marble-like look was acquired by the use of stucco moldings, which caused portions of the wall to appear raised. Other simulated elements (e.g. suspended alabaster discs in vertical lines, 'wooden' beams in yellow and 'pillars' and 'cornices' in white), and the use of vivid color, were considered signs of wealth. Those who were not as wealthy mainly used variations of the colors yellow, purple, and pink.

This style reflects the spread of Hellenistic culture as Rome interacted and conquered Greek and Hellenistic states in this period. Mural reproductions of Greek paintings are also found. This style divided the wall into various multi-colored patterns that took the place of extremely expensive cut stone. The First Style was also used with other styles for decorating the lower sections of walls that were not seen as much as the higher levels.

Examples for the first style spread through large parts of the mediterranean. Most famous are the examples from Herculaneum and Pompeii, such as the include the wall painting in the Samnite House in Herculaneum (late 2nd century BC), or at the House of Faun and the House of Sallust in Pompeii.

=== Second Style: Architectural ===
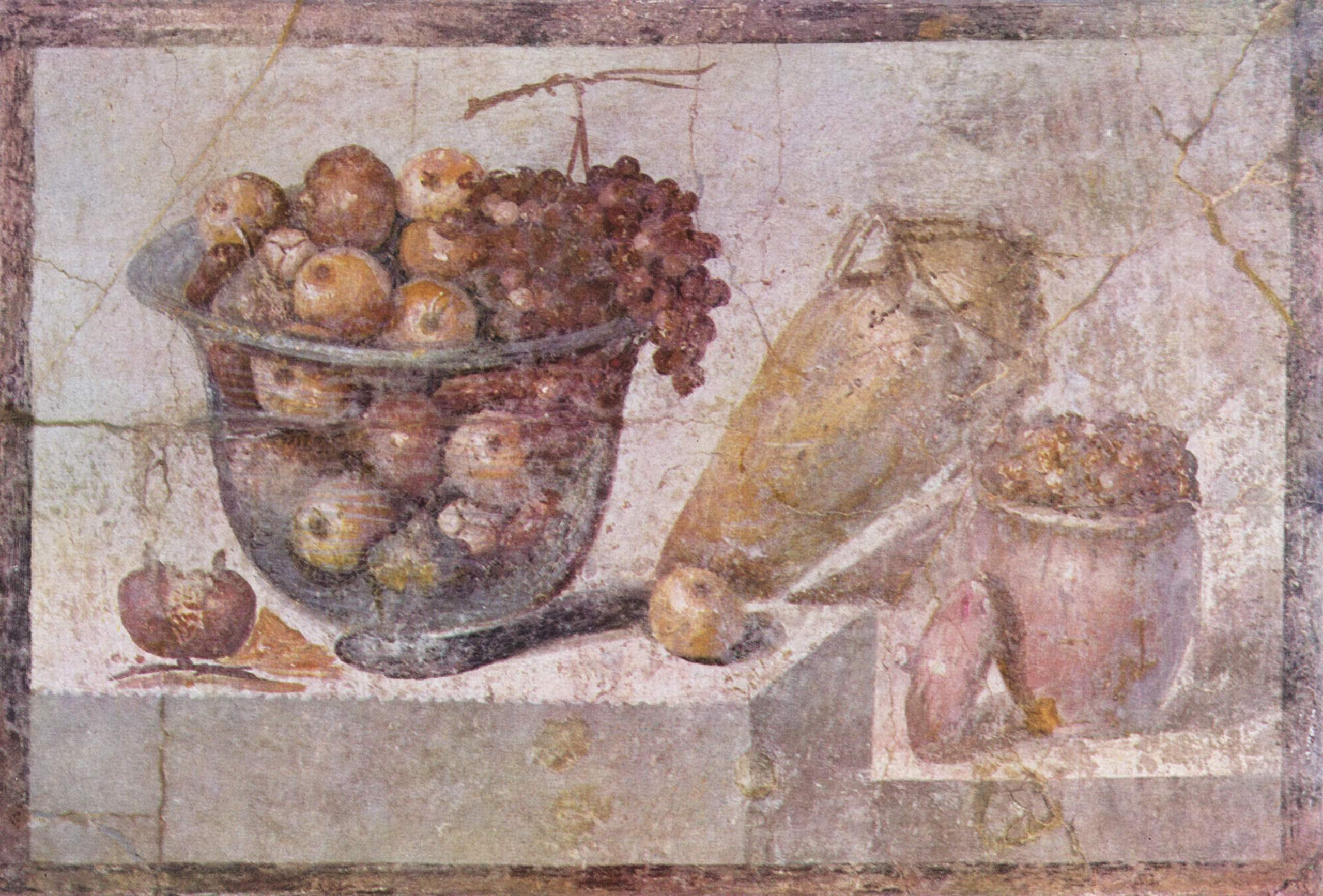
Still life in the Second style. Fresco from the home of Julia Felix, Pompeii

The Second style, architectural style, or 'illusionism' dominated the 1st century BC, where walls were decorated with architectural features and trompe-l'œil (trick of the eye) compositions. Early on, elements of this style are reminiscent of the First Style, but this slowly starts to be substituted element by element. This technique consists of highlighting elements to pass them off as three-dimensional realities – columns for example, dividing the wall-space into zones – and was a method widely used by the Romans.

The second style retained the usage of marble blocks. The blocks were typically lined along the base of the wall and the actual picture was created on flat plaster. However, many paintings from this style involved illusions of imaginary scenes. Painters wanted to give off the illusion that the viewer was looking through a window at the scenery depicted. They also added objects that are commonly seen in real life such as vases and shelves along with items that appeared to be sticking out of the wall. This style was intended for viewers to feel as though the actions in the painting were taking place around them.

It is characterized by use of relative perspective (not precise linear perspective because this style involves mathematical concepts and scientific proportions like that of the Renaissance) to create trompe-l'œil in wall paintings. The picture plane was pushed farther back into the wall by painted architectonic features such as Ionic columns or stage platforms. These wall paintings counteracted the claustrophobic nature of the small, windowless rooms of Roman houses.

Images and landscapes began to be introduced to the first style around 90 BC, and gained ground from 70 BC onwards, along with illusionistic and architectonic motives. Decoration had to give the greatest possible impression of depth. Imitations of images appeared, at first in the higher section, then (after 50 BC) in the background of landscapes which provided a stage for mythological stories, theatrical masks, or decorations.

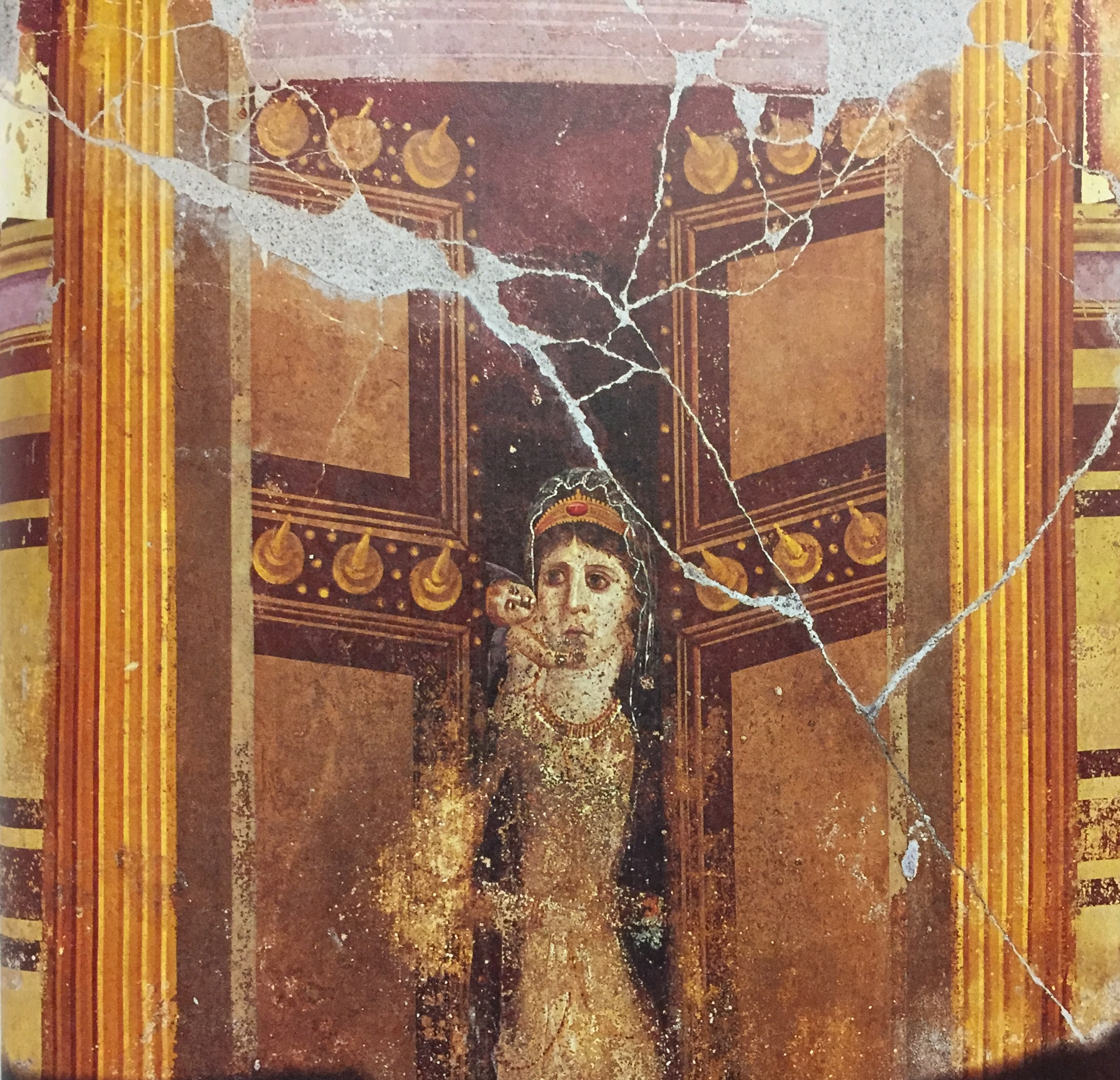
A Roman Second-style painting in the House of Marcus Fabius Rufus at Pompeii, Italy, depicting Cleopatra VII as Venus Genetrix and her son Caesarion as a cupid, mid-1st century BC

During the reign of Augustus, the style evolved. False architectural elements opened up wide expanses with which to paint artistic compositions. A structure inspired by stage sets developed, whereby one large central tableau is flanked by two smaller ones. In this style, the illusionistic tendency continued, with a 'breaking up' of walls with painted architectural elements or scenes. The landscape elements eventually took over to cover the entire wall, with no framing device, so it looked to the viewer as if he or she was merely looking out of a room onto a real scene. Basically, the more developed Second Style was the antithesis of the First Style. Instead of confining and strengthening the walls, the goal was to break down the wall to show scenes of nature and the outside world. Much of the depth of the mature Second Style comes from the use of aerial (atmospheric) perspective that blurred the appearance of objects further away. Thus, the foreground is rather precise while the background is somewhat indistinctly purple, blue, and gray.

One of the most recognized and unique pieces representing the Second Style is the Dionysiac mystery frieze in the Villa of the Mysteries. This work depicts the Dionysian Cult that was made up of mostly women. In the scene, however, one boy is depicted.

Fashionable particularly from the 40s BC onwards, it began to wane in the final decades BC.

An example is the architectural painting at the Villa Boscoreale at Boscoreale (c. 40 BC).

=== Third Style: Ornamental ===
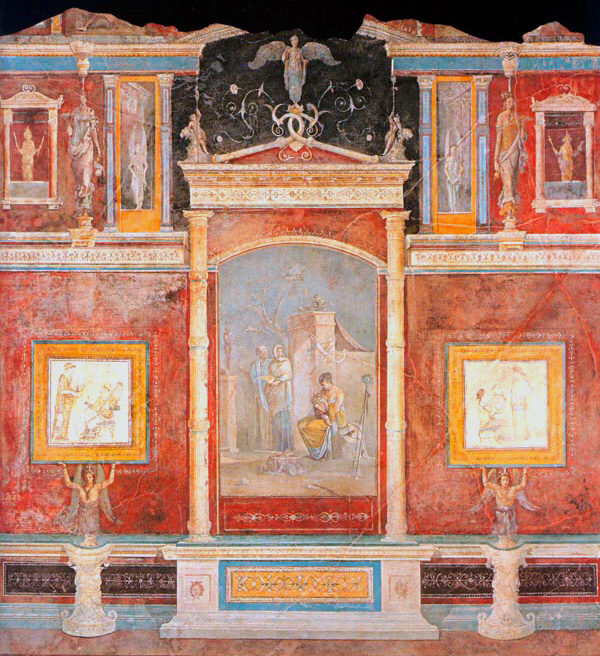
Fresco in the Third style, from Casa della Farnesina in Trastevere

The Third style, or ornate style, was popular around 20–10 BC as a reaction to the austerity of the previous period. It leaves room for more figurative and colorful decoration, with an overall more ornamental feeling, and often presents great finesse in execution. This style is typically noted as simplistically elegant.

Its main characteristic was a departure from illusionistic devices, although these (along with figural representation) later crept back into this style. It obeyed strict rules of symmetry dictated by the central element, dividing the wall into three horizontal and three to five vertical zones. The vertical zones would be divided up by geometric motifs or bases, or slender columns of foliage hung around candelabra. In this particular style, more wall space is left plainly colored, with no design. When designs were present, they tended to be small, plain pictures or scenes such as a candelabrum or fluted appendages. Delicate motifs of birds or semi-fantastical animals appeared in the background. Plants and characteristically Egyptian animals were often introduced, part of the Egyptomania in Roman art after Augustus' defeat of Cleopatra and annexation of Egypt in 30 BC.

These paintings were decorated with delicate linear fantasies, predominantly monochromatic, that replaced the three-dimensional worlds of the Second Style. Also included in this style are paintings similar to the one found in Cubiculum 15 of the Villa of Agrippa Postumus in Boscotrecase (c. 10 BC). These involve a delicate architectural frame over a blank, monochromatic background with only a small scene located in the middle, like a tiny floating landscape. Black, red, and yellow continued to be used throughout this period, but the use of green and blue became more prominent than in previous styles.

It was found in Rome until 40 AD and in the Pompeii area until 60 AD.

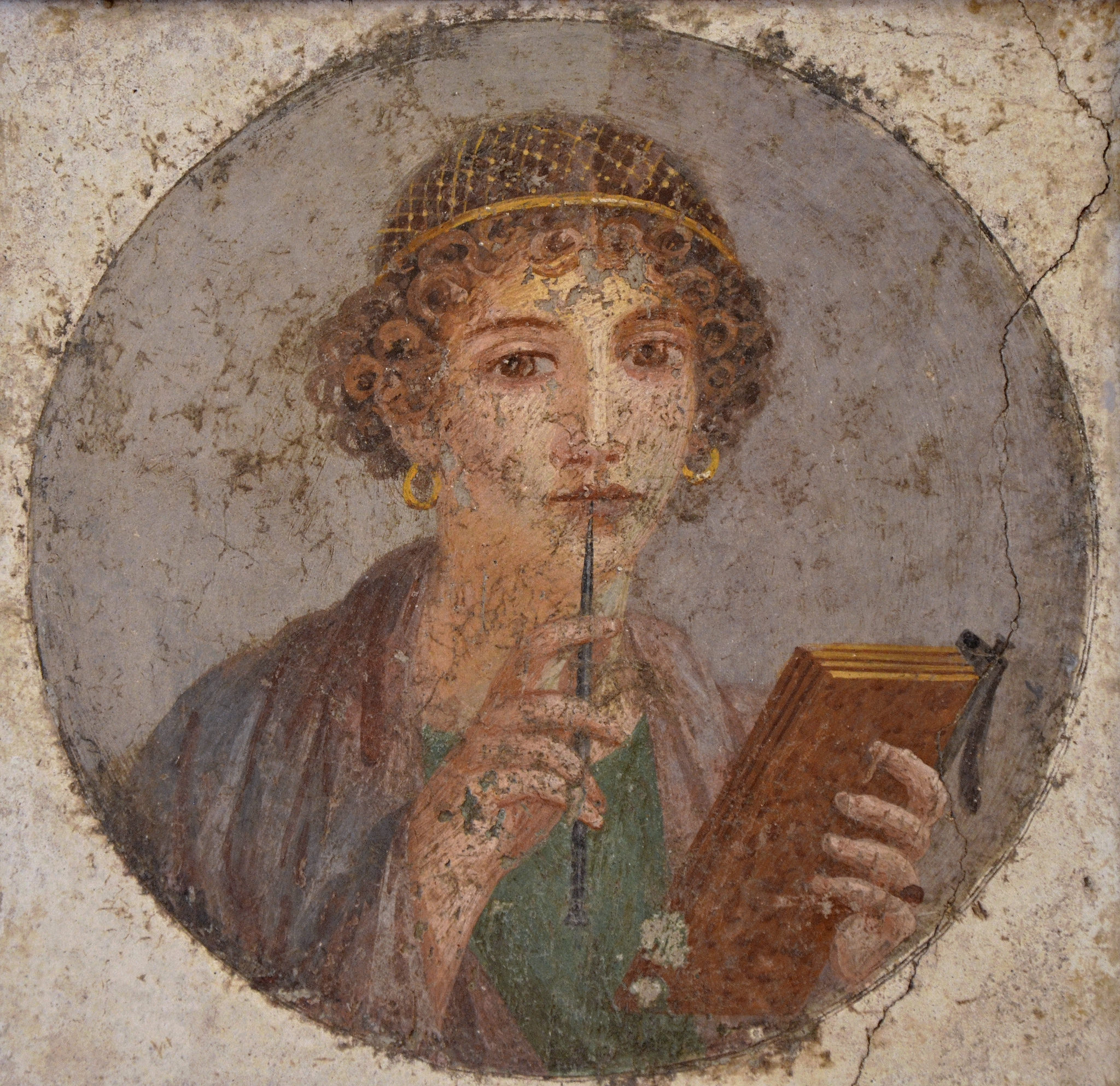
A fresco thematically rare to see in Pompeii frescoes, depicting an educated women once thought to be Sappho (mid-1st century AD, excavated 1760).

Commonly painted subjects include Greek mythology and sex, which is very openly exhibited. A fresco depicting the god of fertility, Priapus, balancing his enlarged phallus with some money is an example. A rarely depicted subject is educated women, with a fresco depicting an educated woman reading, of c. 50 AD.

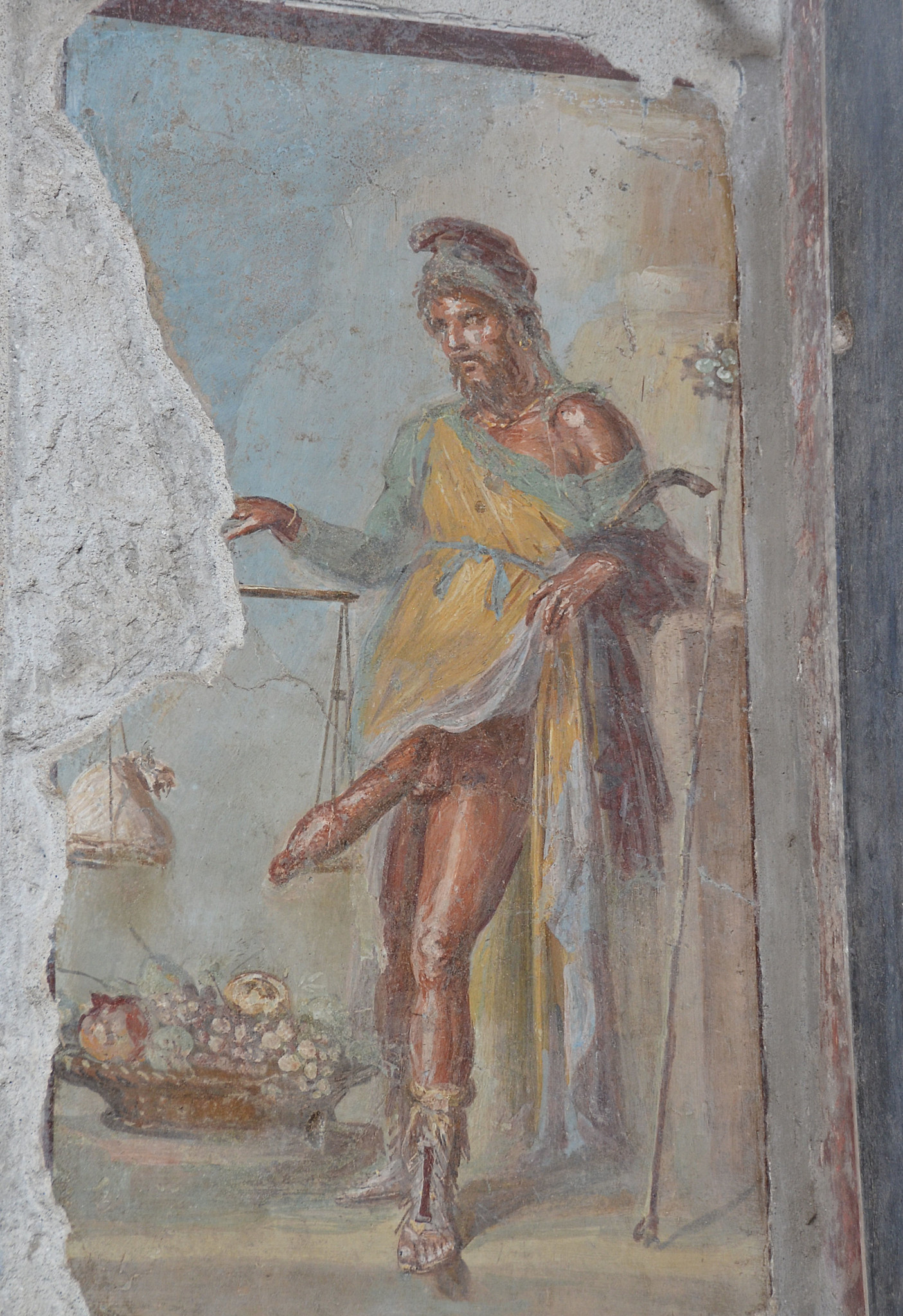
A fresco depicting the god of fertility balancing his phallus with a bag of money

=== Fourth Style: Intricate ===
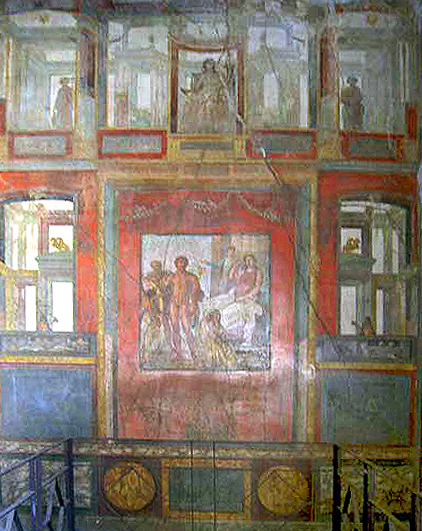
Fresco in the Fourth style, from House of the Vettii

Characterized as a Baroque reaction to the Third Style's mannerism, the Fourth Style in Roman wall painting (c. 60–79 AD) is generally less ornamented than its predecessor. The style was, however, much more complex. It revives large-scale narrative painting and panoramic vistas while retaining the architectural details of the Second and First Styles. In the Julio-Claudian phase (c. 20–54 AD), a textile-like quality dominates and tendrils seem to connect all the elements on the wall. The colors warm up once again, and they are used to advantage in the depiction of scenes drawn from mythology, landscapes, and other images.

Intricate paintings appeared busier and used the wall in its entirety to be complete. The overall feeling of the walls typically formed a mosaic of framed pictures. The lower zones of these walls tended to be composed of the First Style. Panels were also used with floral designs on the walls. A prime example of the Fourth Style is the Ixion Room in the House of the Vettii in Pompeii. One of the largest contributions seen in the Fourth Style is the advancement of still life with intense space and light. Shading was very important in the Roman still life. This style was never truly seen again until the 17th and 18th centuries with the Dutch and English decoration.

== Post-eruption ==
All four styles of wall painting were developed prior to the eruption of Mount Vesuvius in 79 AD, which covered Pompeii in ash. The town was never reoccupied and so the development of strictly "Pompeian" painting ended. Elsewhere the same styles had been widely used in Italy and they continued in use, while Roman painting styles continued to develop.

== See also ==
- Maison pompéienne, 19th century house in Paris imitating Pompeian style

== Sources ==
- Pompeian 'Style' – a re-examination
- Gardner's Art Through the Ages
