= Early Christian lamps =

Religious symbol of divinity

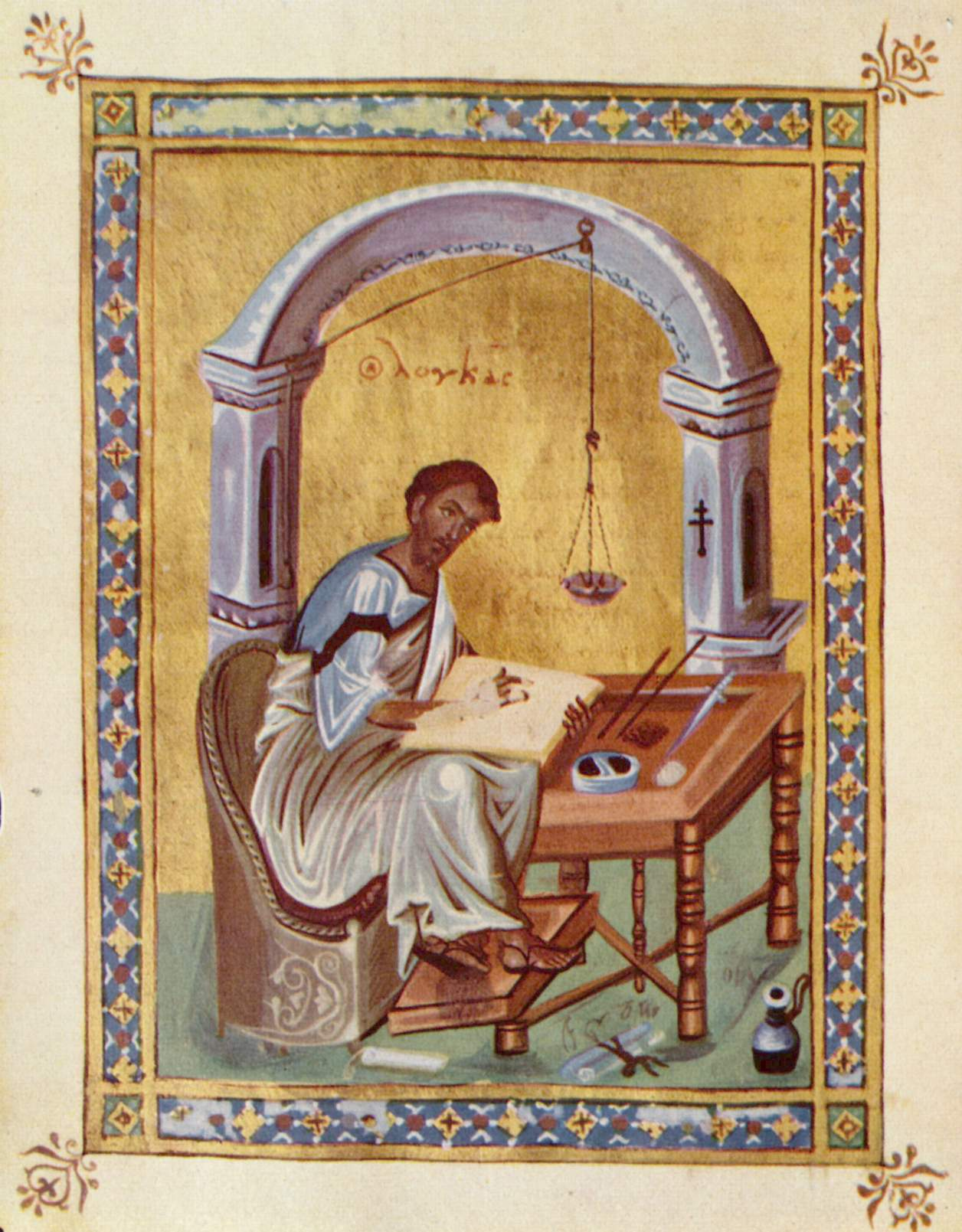
Evangelist Luke writing under an oil lamp (Byzantine illumination, 10th century).

In Early Christianity lamps, fire and light are conceived as symbols, if not as visible manifestations, of the divine nature and the divine presence.

In the Christian world view Christ is the true Light, and Christians are viewed as children of Light at perpetual war with the powers of darkness.

There is no evidence of any ceremonial use of lights in Christian worship during its first two centuries. It is recorded, that on the occasion of St. Paul's preaching at Alexandria in Troas there were many lights in the upper chamber; but this was at night. And the most that can be hazarded is that a specially large number were lighted as a festive illumination, as in modern Church festivals. As to a purely ceremonial use, such early evidence as exists is all the other way. Tertullian writes of the Christian practice during the 2nd century: "on days of rejoicing, he says, we do not shade our door-posts with laurels nor encroach upon the day-light with lamp laurels" (die lacto non laurels pastes obumbramus nec lucernis diem infringimus). Lactantius, writing early in the 4th century, is even more sarcastic in his references to the heathen practice. "They kindle lights", he says, "as though to one who is in darkness. Can he be thought sane who offers the light of lamps and candles to the Author and Giver of all light?". This is primarily an attack on votive lights, and does not necessarily exclude their ceremonial use in other ways. There is, indeed, evidence that they were so used before Lactantius wrote. The 34th canon of the Synod of Elvira (305), which was contemporary with him, forbade candles to be lit in cemeteries during the daytime, which points to an established custom as well as to an objection to it; and in the Roman catacombs lamps have been found of the 2nd and 3rd centuries which seem to have been ceremonial or symbolical.

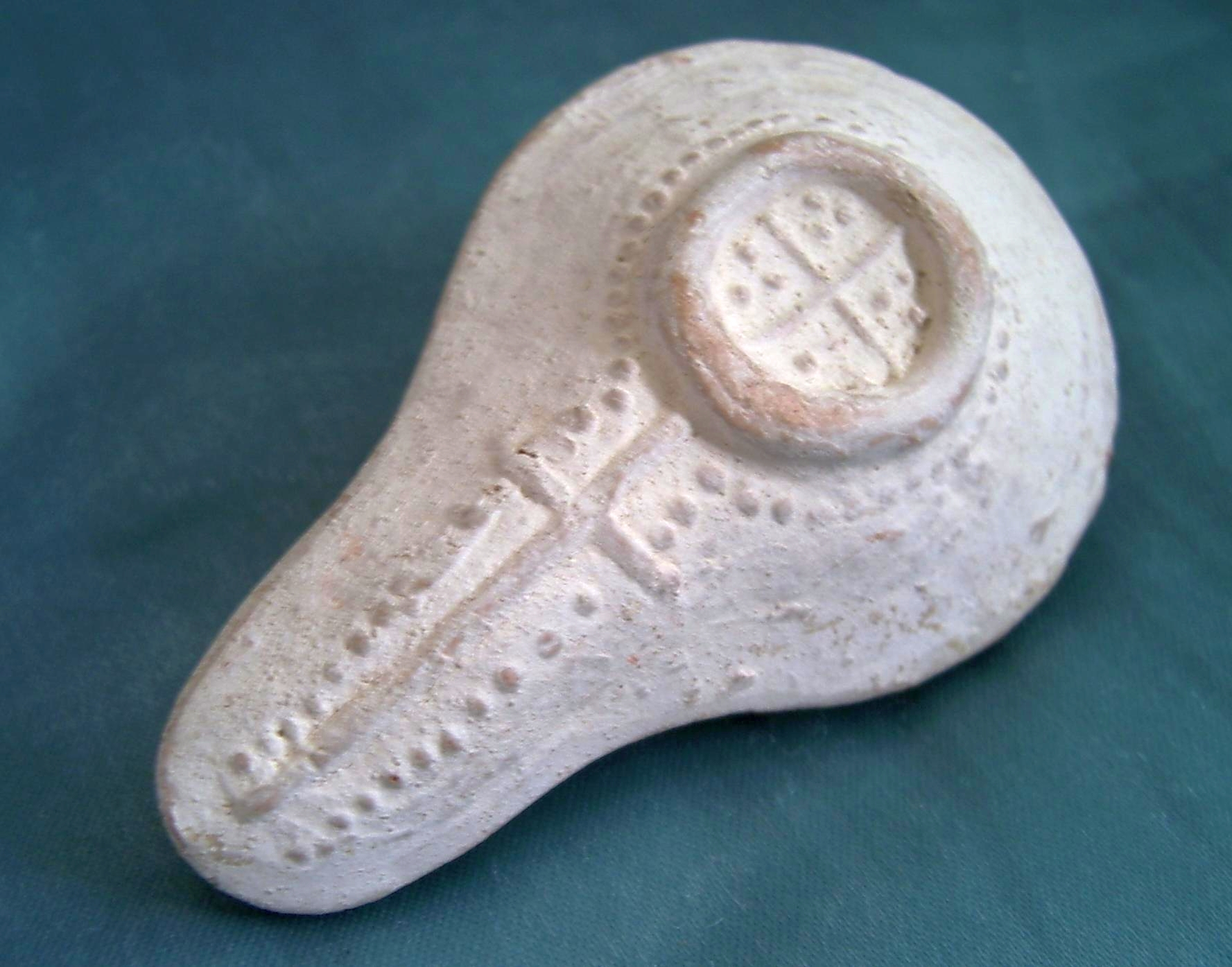
Roman oil lamp, around 200 A.D., underside, showing crosses.

Again, according to the Acta of St Cyprian (d. 258), his body was borne to the grave praelucentibus cereis, and Prudentius, in his hymn on the 2nd and martyrdom of St Lawrence, says that in the time of St Laurentius, i.e. the middle of the 3rd century, candles stood in the churches of Rome on golden candelabra. The gift, mentioned by Anastasius, made by Constantine to the Vatican basilica, of a pharum of gold, garnished with 500 dolphins each holding a lamp, to burn before St Peter's tomb, points also to a custom well established before Christianity became the state religion.

It is difficult to determine early Christian customs regarding lamps, due to services being held primarily at night. By the close of the 4th century the ceremonial use of lights had become firmly and universally established in the Church. This is clear, to pass by much other evidence, from the controversy of St Jerome with Vigilantius.

Vigilantius, a presbyter of Barcelona, still occupied the position of Tertullian and Lactantius in this matter. "We see", he wrote, "a rite peculiar to the pagans introduced into the churches on pretext of religion, and, while the sun is still shining, a mass of wax tapers lighted. … A great honor to the blessed martyrs, whom they think to illustrate with contemptible little candles" (de vilissimis cereolis). Jerome, the most influential theologian of the day, took up the cudgels against Vigilantius, who, in spite of his fatherly admonition, had dared again to open his foul mouth and send forth a filthy stink against the relics of the holy martyrs. "If candles are lit before their tombs, are these the ensigns of idolatry?" In his treatise contra Vigilantium he answers the question with much common sense. "There can be no harm if ignorant and simple people or religious women, light candles in honor of the martyrs. We are not born, but reborn, Christians, and that which when done for idols was detestable is acceptable when done for the martyrs. As in the case of the woman with the precious box of ointment, it is not the gift that merits reward, but the faith that inspires it." As for lights in the churches, he adds that in all the churches of the East, whenever the gospel is to be read, lights are lit, though the sun be rising (jam sole rutilante), not in order to disperse the darkness, but as a visible sign of gladness (ad signum letitiae demonstrandum). Taken in connection with a statement which almost immediately precedes this - "Cereos autem non clara luce accendimus, sicut frustra calumniaris: sed ut noctis tenebras hoc solatio temperemus" - this seems to point to the fact that the ritual use of lights in the church services, so far as already established, arose from the same conservative habit as determined the development of liturgical vestments, i.e. the lights which had been necessary at the nocturnal meetings were retained, after the hours of service had been altered, and invested with a symbolical meaning.

Already they were used at most of the conspicuous functions of the Church. Paulinus, bishop of Nola (d. 431), describes the altar at the eucharist as "crowned with crowded lights", and even mentions the "eternal lamp". For their use at baptisms there is, among much other evidence, that of Zeno of Verona for the West, and that of Gregory of Nazianzus for the East. Their use at funerals is illustrated by Eusebius' description of the burial of Constantine, and Jerome's account of that of Saint Paula. At ordinations they were used, as is shown by the 6th canon of the Council of Carthage (398), which decrees that the acolyte is to hand to the newly ordained deacon ceroferarium cum cereo. This symbolism was not pagan, i.e. the lamps were not placed in the graves as part of the furniture of the dead; in the Catacombs they are found only in the niches of the galleries and the arcosolia, nor can they have been votive in the sense popularized later. Clara coronantur densis altaria lychnis. Continuum scyphus est argenteus aptus ad usum. Sal, ignis et oleum. Cum alii Pontifices lampads cereosque proferrent, alii choras psallentium ducerent..

Lamps have been found in all centers of ancient Christianity.

== Liturgical use ==
There is very little evidence that any strictly liturgical use was made of lamps in the early centuries of Christianity. The fact that many of the services took place at night, and that after the lapse of a generation or two the meetings of the Christians for purposes of worship were held, at Rome and elsewhere, in the subterranean chambers of the Catacombs, make it clear that lamps must have been used to provide the necessary means of illumination. Of these lamps, mostly of terra cotta and of small size, many specimens survive, some of them plain, some decorated with various Christian symbols.

These admit of classification according to period and locality, the finer work, as in so many other branches of Christian art, being as a rule the earlier (see e.g. Leclercq, "Manuel d'archeologie chretienne" II, 557 seq.). Of the great metal chandeliers with their "dolphins" — i.e. little arms wrought in that shape and supporting a lamp — which came into vogue with the freedom of the Church in the days of Constantine, something has already been said under the heading Candlesticks. Such "polycandela" long remained a conspicuous feature of Byzantine worship.

For the connection of lamps with the liturgy at an earlier age it may be sufficient to quote a few sentences from a homily of the Syrian Narsai, who died A.D. 512, descriptive of the Liturgy. "The priests", he says, "are still, and the deacons stand in silence, the whole people is quiet and still, subdued and calm. The altar stands crowned with beauty and splendor, and upon it is the Gospel of life and the adorable wood [i.e. the cross]. The mysteries are set in order, the censers are smoking, the lamps are shining and the deacons are hovering and brandishing [fans] in likeness of watchers." (Conolly "Liturgical Homilies of Narsai", p. 12).

In nearly all the earliest representations of the Last Supper, a lamp is indicated as hanging over the table. A pilgrim writing in about 530 CE in the so-called "Breviarius" claims to have seen at Jerusalem what purported to be the actual lamp which had hung in the chamber of the Last Supper, preserved there as a precious relic. He designates this site as the Basilica of Holy Zion, although there is uncertainty about the exact site to which he refers.
