= Casalnuovo di Napoli =

Casalnuovo di Napoli Casalnuovo 'e Napule (Neapolitan)
- Comune
- Comune di Casalnuovo di Napoli
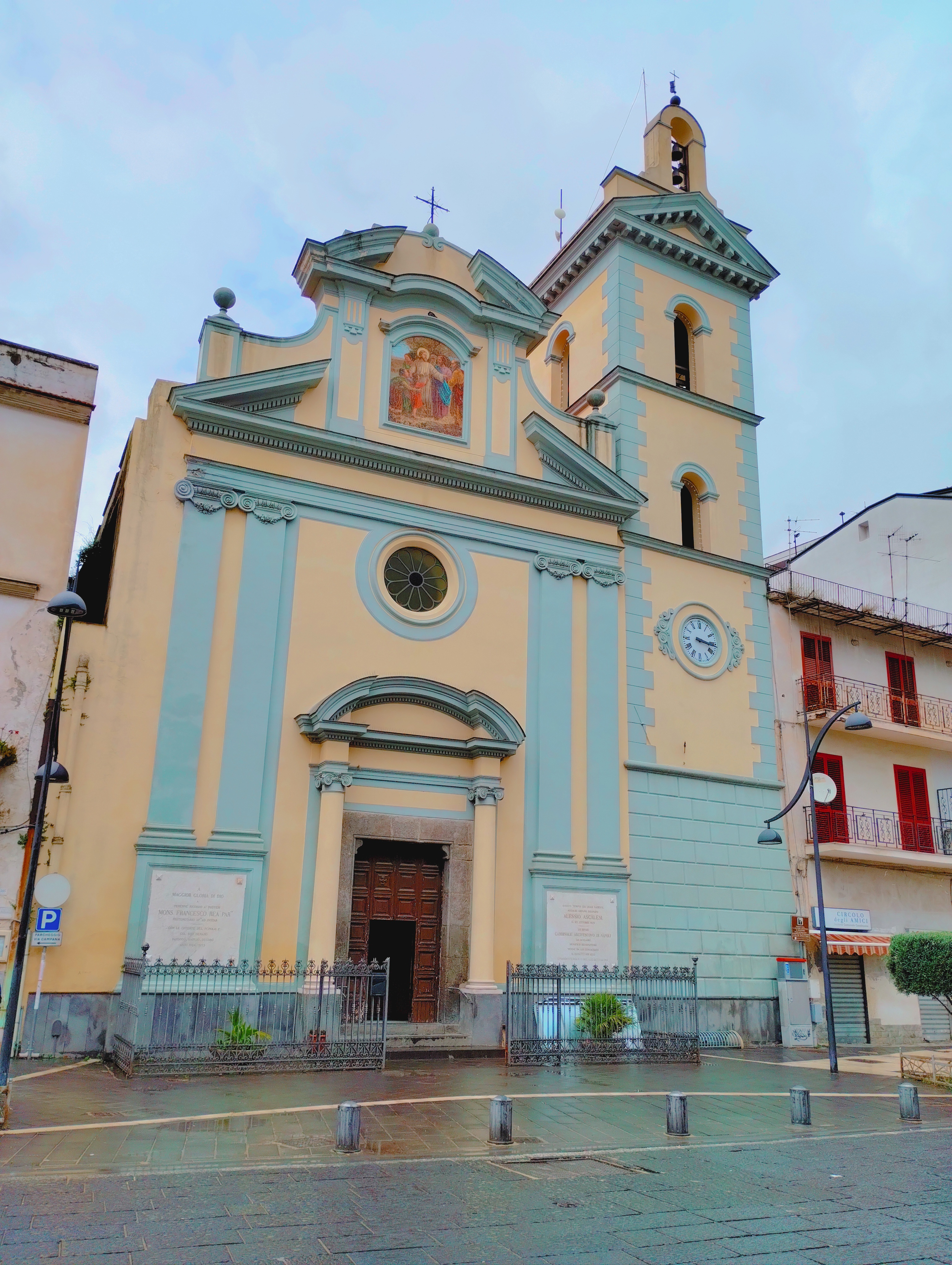
- Mother Church of San Giacomo Apostolo Maggiore

- Location within Italy Location within Campania
- Coordinates: 40°55′N 14°21′E
- Country: Italy
- Region: Campania
- Metropolitan city: Naples (NA)
- Frazioni: Casarea, Tavernanova, Licignano and Talona

Government
  - Mayor: Massimo Pelliccia

Area
  - Total: 7.83 km^{2} (3.02 sq mi)
- Elevation: 26 m (85 ft)

Population (2026)
  - Total: 46,663
  - Density: 5,960/km^{2} (15,400/sq mi)
- Demonym: Casalnovesi
- Time zone: UTC+1 (CET)
  - Summer (DST): UTC+2 (CEST)
- Postal code: 80013 e 80015
- Dialing code: 081
- Website: Official website

Casalnuovo di Napoli (Italian: [kaˌzalˈnwɔːvo di ˈnaːpoli, kaˌsal-]; Neapolitan: Casalnuovo 'e Napule) is a city and comune (municipality) in the Metropolitan City of Naples in the region of Campania in Italy, located about 13 kilometres (8 miles) northeast of Naples. It has 46,663 inhabitants.

The municipality of Casalnuovo di Napoli contains the frazioni (hamlets) of: Casarea, Tavernanova, Licignano and Talona.

Casalnuovo di Napoli borders the municipalities of Acerra, Afragola, Casoria, Pollena Trocchia, Pomigliano d'Arco, Sant'Anastasia, Volla, and Somma Vesuviana.

The municipal capital stands on the ruins of Archora, one of the villages that had given rise to the neighboring city of Afragola, and also includes the suppressed municipality of Licignano di Napoli, corresponding to the Roman settlement of Licinianum. It also includes the towns of Tavernanova and Casarea, acquired in 1929 by spin-off from the municipalities of Pomigliano d'Arco and Afragola. From an ecclesiastical point of view, instead, the parishes are divided between the archdiocese of Naples (city centre and Casarea fraction), the diocese of Acerra (Licignano and Talona fraction) and the diocese of Nola (Tavernanova fraction).

== History ==
=== Casalnuovo ===
The town rises on the ruins of Archora, one of the villages from which the city of Afragola originated. At the beginning of the 15th century the village was acquired by the baron Giovanni III de Alexandro, belonging to the House D'Alessandro, who lived between Terra di Lavoro and Naples. This baron was also known as the Grand Chamberlain of Calabria (1415) and Marshal of the Kingdom and then he was the Counsellor of Queen Giovanna II. In 1484, Angiolo Como was granted the ruins of the village by Ferdinando II of Aragon, and on these ruins he built a new place, which was recognized as one of the houses of the diocese of Naples with the name of Casalnuovo, since it formerly constituted a farmhouse of Naples.

With the urban reform of Gioacchino Murat, the farmhouses of Casalnuovo and Salice, together with the farmhouse of Arcopinto (which today is divided into three municipalities) and the farmhouse of Afragola, merged into the commune of Afragola. The municipal territory of Casalnuovo was enlarged by Royal Decree of 25 February 1929, n. 316, with the consolidation of the then municipality of Licignano di Napoli, and the addition of parts of the territory belonging to the municipalities of Afragola and Pomigliano d'Arco. During the administrative redesign wanted by fascism, Licignano, after having been part of different municipalities, became a small fraction of Casalnuovo di Napoli.

In the 1950s, due to the divestiture of some territories of San Sebastiano al Vesuvio, the hamlets of Tavernanova and Casarea were added to the municipality of Casalnuovo, while the area called Botteghelle, between Casalnuovo and Tavernanova, continued to be part of the municipality of Afragola until the 1970s. In the late 1990s, the municipality of Casalnuovo obtained an additional portion of territory which used to be part of Afragola, because of the compensatory programme on the environmental impact determined by the high-speed railway station of Afragola on the neighbouring municipalities.

=== Licignano ===
Licignano was the most southerly village of the County of Acerra until Ferdinando de Cardenas sold it to Bartolo Rendina in 1534. The Rendina Family transformed the medieval farm where the town stored (and ground) the grain for the Count of Acerra into a fortified palace where they ruled the new Barony. In 1666 the Salerno Family brought the town and in 1774 Gennaro Maria Salerno hired Salvatore Lanzetta to build - from the old fortress - the new palace of the first Duchy of Licignano (completed in 1780). With the end of Feudalism in the Kingdom of Two Sicilies the Duchy was sold to Balzo of Presenzano and then to Anfora family while Carmine Lancellotti of Durazzo (Prince of Lauro and cadet branch of Ladislaus of Naples) brought the duchy palace in 1920. During the early stage of the Kingdom of Italy, Giuseppe Anfora di Licignano was the Italian ambassador in Guatemala, Uruguay, Argentina and Paraguay (1868–1894). In the 19th century Licignano was an independent town, then district of Pomigliano, then a town again until it was forced to merge with Casalnuovo in 1929.

== Geography ==
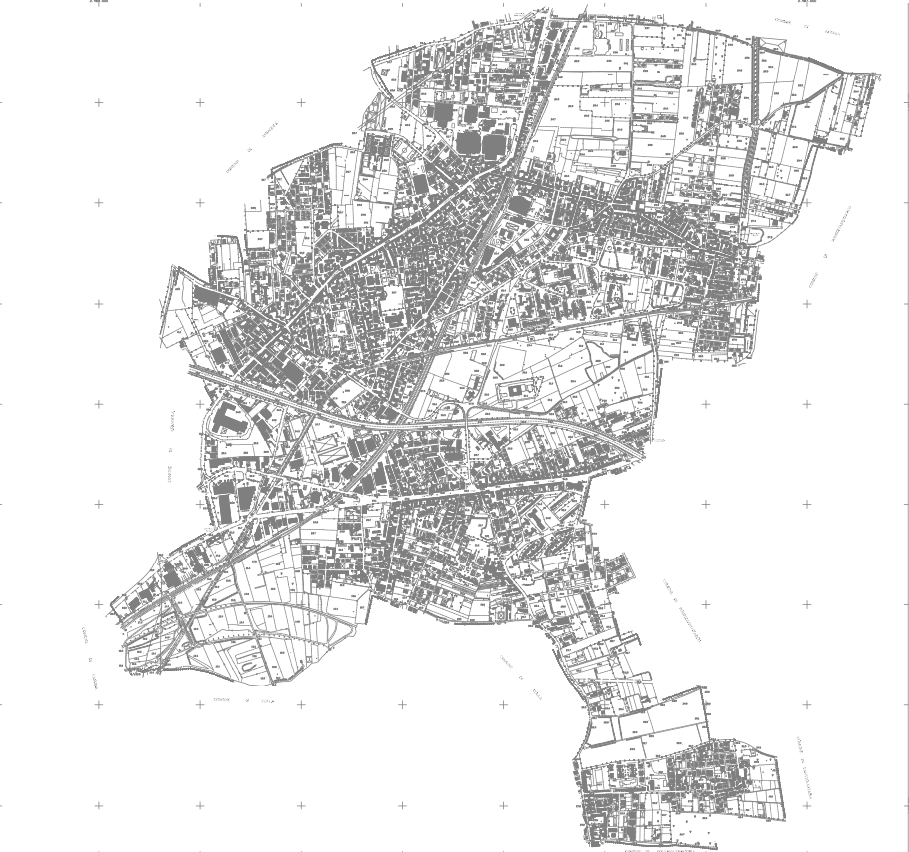
Casalnuovo Map

As a municipality born from different town, Casalnuovo di Napoli is split in neighborhoods and districts:

- Casalnuovo: Botteghelle, Casalnuovo (old town), Saggese and Capo Mazzo
- Licignano: la Pigna, Licignano (old town) and Talona
- Tavernanova: Salice, Tavernanova, Tufarelli and Canonica
- Casarea

== Demographics ==
Historical population
Year	Pop.	±%
1861	5,468	—
1871	5,807	+6.2%
1881	6,898	+18.8%
1901	8,855	+28.4%
1911	9,280	+4.8%
1921	9,676	+4.3%
1931	10,976	+13.4%
1936	11,794	+7.5%
1951	13,869	+17.6%
1961	16,105	+16.1%
1971	17,721	+10.0%
1981	21,033	+18.7%
1991	32,134	+52.8%
2001	47,940	+49.2%
2011	48,621	+1.4%
2021	47,428	−2.5%
Source: ISTAT

As of 2026, the population is 46,663, of which 48.7% are male, and 51.3% are female. Minors make up 17.6% of the population, and seniors make up 16.8%.

=== Immigration ===
As of 2025, immigrants make up 2.1% of the population. The 5 largest foreign countries of birth are Ukraine, Germany, Morocco, Poland, and Brazil.

== Economy ==
=== Factories ===
In the past, Casalnuovo di Napoli, was one of the main industrial centres of the Neapolitan hinterland, due to some companies which had their own factories here. Among the most important companies, there were: Moneta, Eridania, Colussi, Liquigas and Hensemberger (accumulators industry), whose factories are now almost abandoned. However, there are several small and medium-sized enterprises operating in the textile and footwear sector in town, as shown by the presence (in the former Colussi factory) of the "Polo della Moda", which represents one of the main poles of the textile industry in all the Campania region. Another very important one is the well-known men's tailoring company ISAIA, which today mainly produces men's high fashion clothes. Over the years, the company has experienced a process of industrialization to such an extent that they began exporting their garments abroad, including to company-owned shops abroad. At the entrance of the town, on the welcome message, the city has been given the title of "city of fashion" in memory of the tailors of great skill who resided here and to those ones who still work in town.

=== Illegal waste practices ===
Casalnuovo has long been a part of what the Guardian has described as "The Triangle of Death," a "vast area to the north-east of Naples where the mafia had established the lucrative business of burying, dumping and burning toxic waste, in turn poisoning swathes of farmland and drinking water." These illegal activities have resulted in soaring cancer rates and calls for government reforms.

== Culture ==
=== Religious traditions ===
The city has many parishes, but also chapels, the main ones: San Giacomo Apostolo il Maggiore (patron saint) and San Nicola di Bari (Patron of Licignano). In addition to the Catholic churches there are also some Christian evangelical churches and a hall of the Kingdom of Jehovah's Witnesses. The city also has a second patron: San Biagio, celebrated on February 3. Many traditions are linked to this date. In the first place the typical one of the country, also for the other patrons, to bring the statue of the saint in procession through the city. San Biagio is protector of the throat and pets. On 3 February, the faithful take the animals to the church to be blessed, or they go to the church to be blessed with holy oil. Officially, however, San Biagio is not the patron saint of the city, like San Giacomo. In fact it is called "patorno di Passaggio", the legend says that the statue of the saint, carried by a cart, was directed to Cancello and Arnone, but the cart wheel broke right in front of the village church, a testimony, for the faithful, that the saint did not want to leave the country. Since then the statue has been kept in the church where it was first sheltered.

The majority of the population is Catholic, but there are also substantial communities of Jehovah's Witnesses and Protestant, and in minimal percentage Sunni Muslims.

=== Education ===
Casalnuovo di Napoli have several elementary schools and middle schools: the ICS "Enrico De Nicola" is set in Casalnuovo (Via Roma and Via Benevento) as ICS "Ragazzi d'Europa" (Via De Curtis), the ICS "Aldo Moro" in Licignano (Via Pigna and Via Marconi) and the ICS "Raffaele Viviani" in Tavernanova (Via Zi Carlo). Outside the public school system work different private schools. The city opened the first high school early 2000's and in the early 2020s activated the first online university:

- IS Giancarlo Siani:
- IP Luigi Stefanini:
- IT Europa:

=== Events ===
The town of Casalnuovo di Napoli held several artistic competitions inside the Pier Paolo Pasolini theatre since 2015:

- Calici e Cotone food and wine (2016) an artisan Kermesse with the participation of artists of national interest
- Una Città Che Scrive (2017) literary prize held to create an anthology entitled "Una Città Che Scrive. Una Città che rinasce"
- Rassegna di Teatro Amatoriale "Oblò" (2015) Neapolitan theatre contest with Carmine Coppola (the last Pulcinella) as president of jury
- Lancillotto al Cinema (2025) school film festival open to national and international shorts

== Architecture ==
=== Churches ===
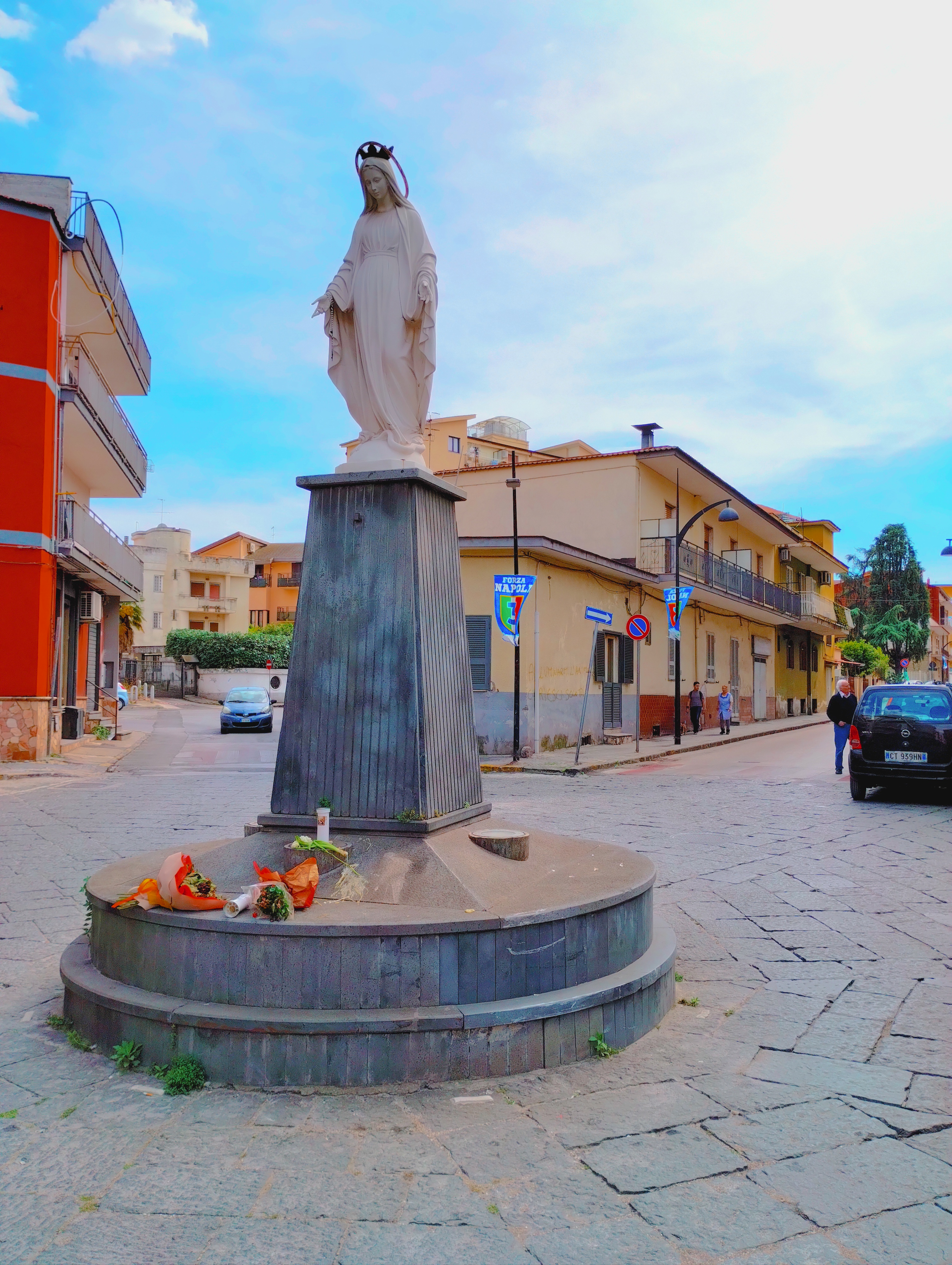
Rotonda dell'Immacolata

- San Giacomo Apostolo il Maggiore (XVI century) the main church of Casalnuovo, rebuilt the first time in 1604 and a second time in 1935 with the help of Cardinal Alessio Ascalesi born in Archora (Afragola) in a house that in the 20th century belong to Casalnuovo
- Church of Santa Maria Dell'Arcora in Casalnuovo
- Chapel San Giovanni Evangelista (1618) founded by Fontana Family in Via Benevento
- Church of San Nicola Di Bari was a medieval chapel elevated in 1583 by Monsignor Scipione Salernitano, Bishop of Acerra, as church of the Duchy of Licignano, it was known as Maria Ss. Annunziata before this title was transferred to the church opened in 1995 in Via Pigna
- Chapel of San Giuseppe (XVII century) in Licignano
- Church of Maria Ss. Addolorata (1957) in Tavernanova
- Church of the Visitation of Mary (1995) in Tavernanova
- Church of Santa Maria Delle Grazie (1817) built in Casarea for Maddalena and Chiacchieri Pisacane

=== Civil and Military architecture ===
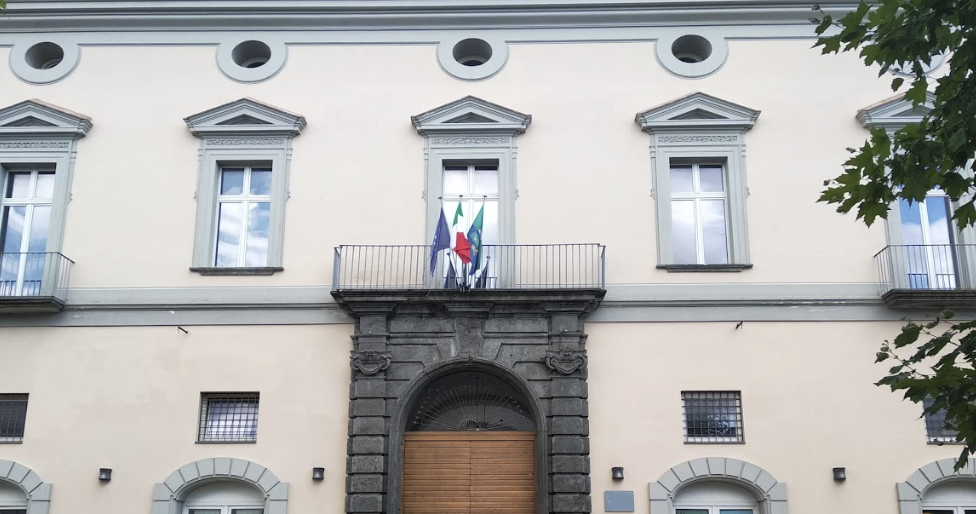
Licignano Palace

- Palazzo Salerno-Lancillotti was built as a medieval farm to store grain for the Count of Acerra, was renovated as a fortress during the Rendina barony (1534–1666), then was transformed into a palace by Gennaro Maria Salerno, first Duke of Licignano
- Palazzo Gaudiosi in Tavernanova (before 1589) was built as a former Benedictine Convent bought by Duke Filippo Gaudiosi in the early 1800s after the suppression of the Monasteries and donated to his nephew Don Pasquale, transforming it into a domus for the holiday with adjoining noble chapel dedicated to the Madonna of Santa Maria ad Nives
- Palazzo Berlingieri was built as castle for Barone don Leonardo Como, Baron of Casalnuovo in 1499, it was sold to Benedetto Farina in 1747 and then to the Berlingieri Family
- Villa Marra a XVIII century military station for cavalry of the House of Bourbon-Two Sicilies built in Via Vernicchi, south the Circumvesuviana line
- Acquedotto della Bolla a XVI aqueduct set in Salice
- Sculptures: Bronze bust of Giacomo Leopardi made by Domenico Sepe (Social Library founded in 2019 by Giovanni Nappi), bust of Totò created in 1980 by a roman artist under a request of Caro Ponticelli (Piazza Antonio De Curtis), the statue of Diego Maradona carved by Fabio Torti (Piazza Municipio) and the roundabout with a Mary, mother of Jesus white sculpture in the square where Via Roma met Via San Giacomo

=== Commercial area ===
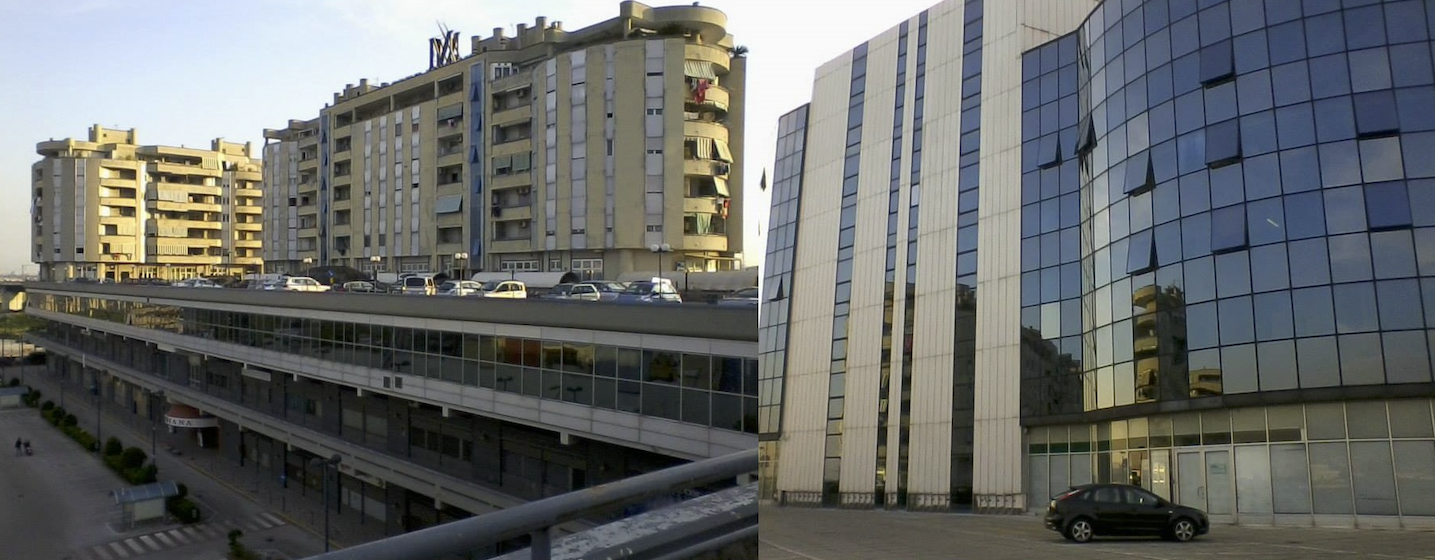
Galleria Meridiana, tower Sirio and Vega on the left and tower Antares on the right

- Galleria Meridiana a twelve-story "Citadel" created in 1996 on Via Nazionale delle Puglie between Casalnuovo and Casoria as commercial and urban area with a three-story mall and three eight-story towers: Antares (office one), Sirio and Vega (with 100 apartments)
- La Piazzetta a Shopping center built from an old factory on Via Napoli with a gym, a pizzeria and a discount store
- Magic Vision a three-story building open in 2002 in Viale dei Tigli with a Cinema in the east side and a Post office in the west with a small mall in the north of its parking lot

=== Streets, Squares and Parks ===
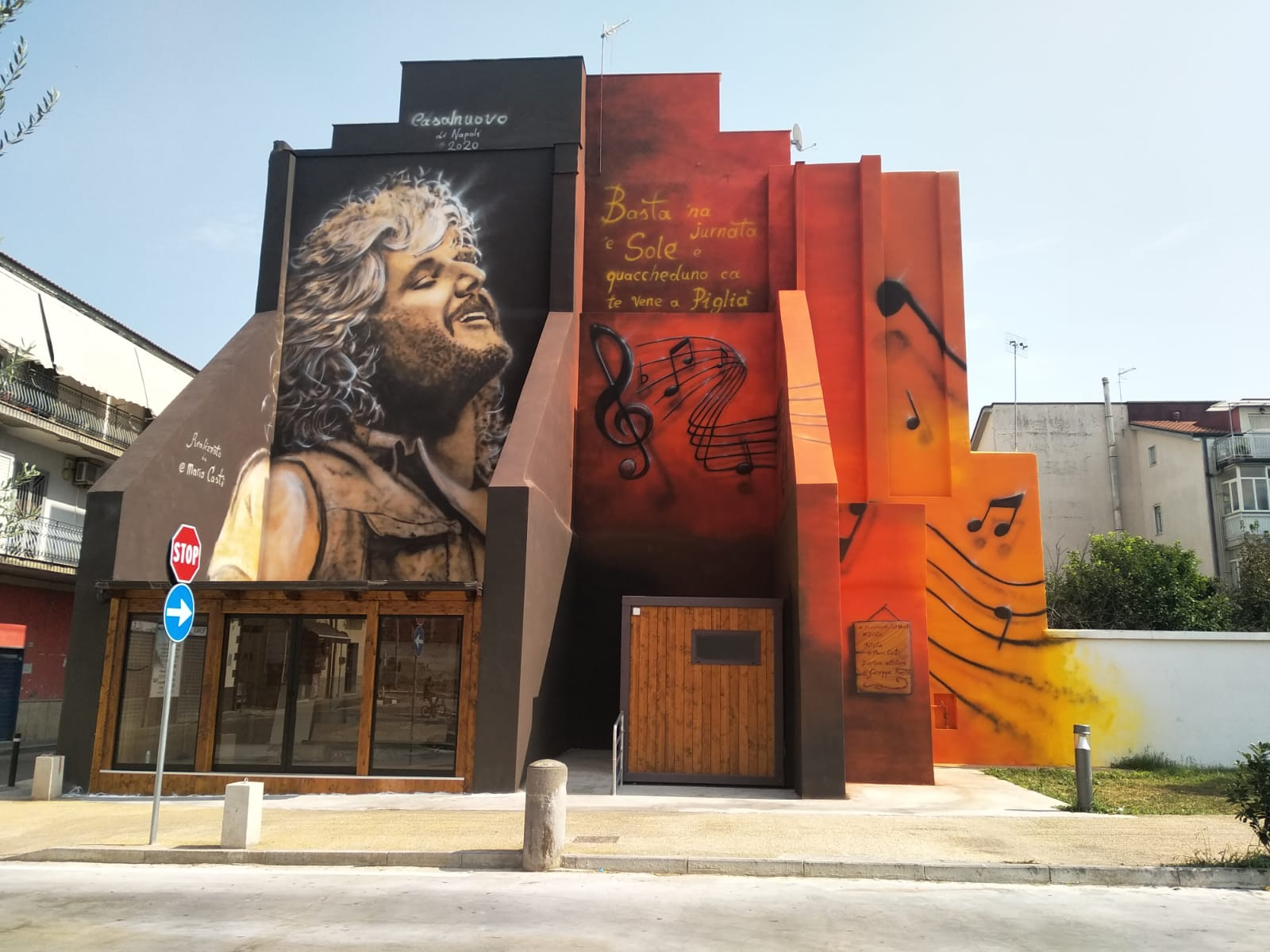
urban park

- Corso Umberto I is the main street of Casalnuovo di Napoli, built on the Statale della Valle Caudina, the State highways (Italy) n°162 along with Via Napoli, Via Benevento and Corso Italia (Acerra): the House of Cardinal Ascalesi, Archbishop of Naples during the WWWII, the Church of San Giacomo Apostolo il Maggiore, the City Hall of Casalnuovo and the Castle of Acerra are on this street
- Via Nazionale delle Puglie is the main street of Tavernanova, built as Strada Regia delle Puglie in 1608 (State Highway n°7bis): Palazzo Gaudiosi and Piazza Giancarlo Siani are on this street
- Via Vittorio Emanuele III is the main street of the old town of Licignano, built on the Provincial road (Italy) n°28 Napoli that connect Via Benevento in Casalnuovo with Via Nazionale delle Puglie in Pomigliano: the Church of San Nicola Di Bari is on this street along with a secondary access to Casalnuovo train station
- Parco Urbano Pino Daniele the main urban park created in Via Giovanni Falcone after the demolition of the east-side of the old Industrial area, its connected to the Casalnuovo national railway station
- Piazza Giancarlo Siani the main square of Tavernanova, it borders Palazzo Gaudiosi, Via Nazionale delle Puglie and Via Arcora

Other important roads are Via Roma in Casalnuovo that run as parallel road of Corso Umberto and the National Railway; Via Arcora that connect Piazza Giancarlo Siani with Via San Marco in Afragola; and Viale dei Tigli in Licignano that is the home of the municipal Cinema and the main post office.

== Sport ==
The ASD Real Casalnuovo was 7th in 2023–24 Serie D Group I, just 3 points below the Playoff zone with a team capped by Reginaldo (footballer, born 1983), a Brazilian footballer that played in Serie A with Treviso, Fiorentina, Parma and Siena.

== Transport ==
Casalnuovo FS Station

Casalnuovo di Napoli is connected with Naples through different bus and train services. The Stazione di Casalnuovo was open in 1843 as a train station on the Rome–Cassino–Naples railway while a second one is waiting to open on the new Naples–Foggia railway. The ANM bus 169 connect Licignano with Piazza Garibaldi in Naples. In 1884 the town got the first Circumvesuvianastation (Casalnuovo) on the Napoli-Nola-Bajano railway, before the 1990s a second station (Talona) was built in Licignano, then in 1992 a third one (La Pigna) was activated that year while the last one (Salice) was opened in 2001 as an underground station.
