= Cercola =

- Comune
- Comune di Cercola
- Coat of arms

- Location within Italy Location within Campania
- Coordinates: 40°52′N 14°21′E
- Country: Italy
- Region: Campania
- Metropolitan city: Naples (NA)
- Frazioni: Caravita

Government
  - Mayor: Vincenzo Fiengo

Area
  - Total: 3.7 km^{2} (1.4 sq mi)
- Elevation: 75 m (246 ft)

Population (1 January 2017)
  - Total: 18,211
  - Density: 4,900/km^{2} (13,000/sq mi)
- Demonym: Cercolesi
- Time zone: UTC+1 (CET)
  - Summer (DST): UTC+2 (CEST)
- Postal code: 80040
- Dialing code: 081
- Website: Official website

Cercola is a comune (municipality) in the Metropolitan City of Naples in the Italian region of Campania, located about 9 km northeast of Naples.

Cercola borders the following municipalities: Massa di Somma, Naples, Pollena Trocchia, San Sebastiano al Vesuvio, Volla.

== People ==
- Alfonso Camorani, footballer
- Domenico Criscito, footballer
- Raffaella Fico, showgirl
- Vittorio Mezzogiorno, actor
- Martina Veneruso, photographer, leather designer
