= Mount Somma =

Summit caldera surrounding Mount Vesuvius

- Monte Somma
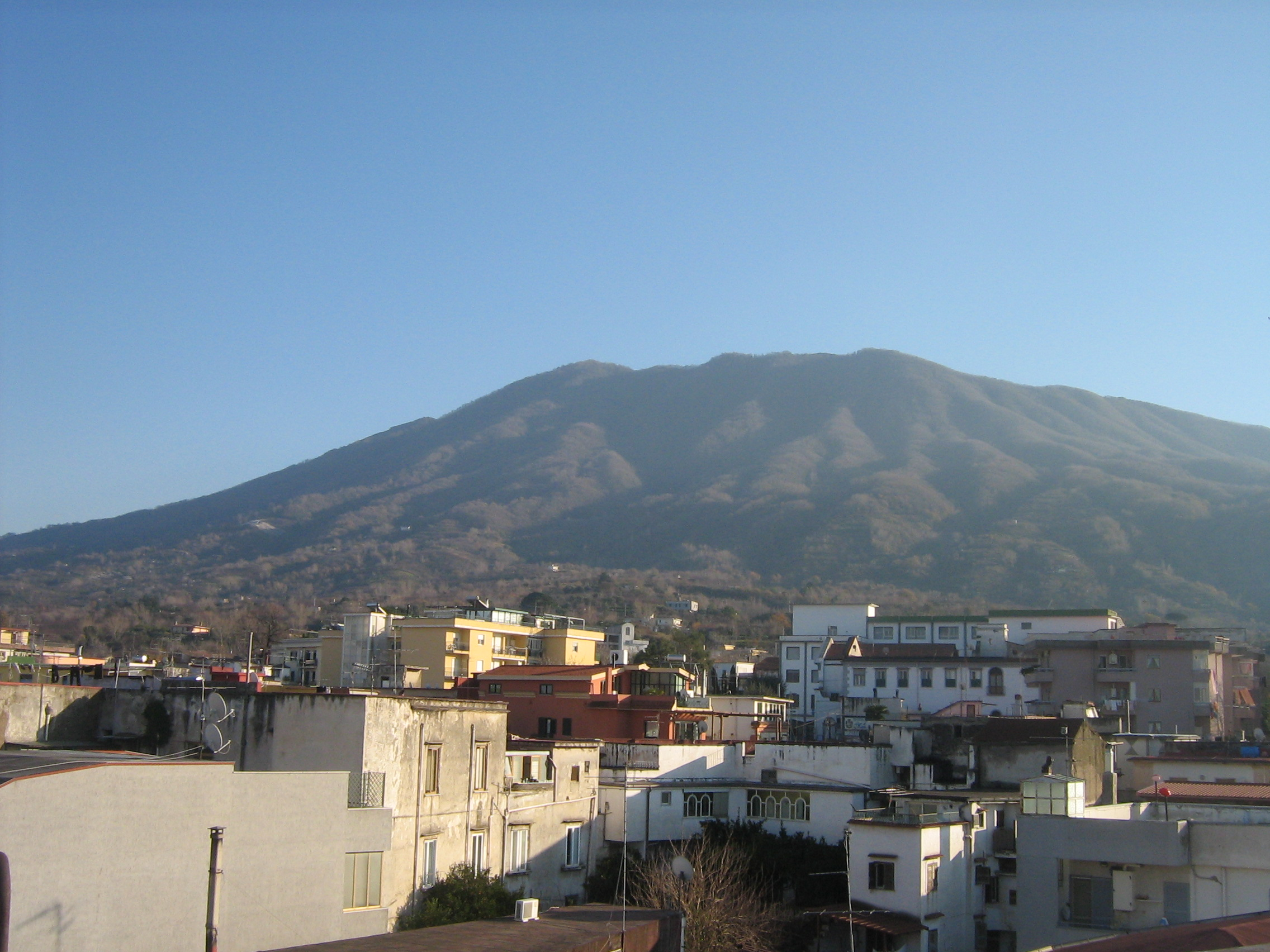
- Mount Somma viewed from the town of Sant'Anastasia

Highest point
- Elevation: 1,132 m (3,714 ft)
- Coordinates: 40°49′18″N 14°25′34″E

Geography
- Location within Italy Location within Campania
- Location: Province of Naples, Campania, Italy
- Parent range: Somma–Vesuvius

Geology
- Rock age: 25,000 BP

Mount Somma (Italian: Monte Somma, lit. 'Mount Summit') is a mountain located in the Province of Naples, in the Campania region of southern Italy. It is 1,132 metres (3,714 ft) high. It is an integral part of the Somma–Vesuvius volcanic complex and of the larger Campanian volcanic arc, which is known for its high levels of seismic and volcanic activity.

The volcano is believed to have formed over 25,000 years ago. It has a collapsed caldera of an older volcano, with Mount Vesuvius rising up from the center. Despite the potential dangers associated with living near an active volcano, the Somma volcano and its surroundings are a popular tourist destination. The mountain lends its name to somma volcanoes, which have a cone rising from within an older caldera.

== Geography ==
Mount Somma is the remnant of a large volcano, out of which the peak cone of Mount Vesuvius has grown. Mount Somma appears to be spread in a semicircle around the north and northeast of Vesuvius. Vesuvius's formation began during the caldera collapse of Mount Somma.

Approaching Mount Somma from the east, four ridges are encountered:

- Cognoli di Trocchia (961 m; 3,153 ft)
- Cognoli di Sant'Anastasia (1,086 m; 3,563 ft)
- Punta del Nasone (1,132 m; 3,714 ft)
- Cognoli di Ottaviano (1,112 m; 3,648 ft)

=== Punta del Nasone ===
The highest point of Mount Somma, at 1,132 metres (3,714 ft), is called "Punta del Nasone" (literally "tip of the big nose") because of its similarity with a nose covered in the profile of a face lying along the top of the mountain and probably also referring to King Ferdinand I of the Two Sicilies, popularly known as "Re Nasone" ("Big Nose King"). This similarity can be seen by looking at Mount Somma from Vesuvius's peak while Ferdinand I is well known himself for the advanced approach he had to Somma-Vesuvius volcanic complex, giving support to geological research and improvement of the area.

=== Lava flows of 1944 ===
In March 1944, a spectacular lava flow interrupted the north outline of the mountain down to the towns of San Sebastiano al Vesuvio and Massa di Somma. A hiking trail (no. 9 in the numbering of the Vesuvius National Park) allows visitors to cross the entire flow at a width of almost 200 metres (660 ft).

=== Olivella ===
Olivella is a village just over 400 m (1/4 mile) north of Mount Somma, in the territory of the municipality of Sant'Anastasia. It looks like a natural amphitheatre on top of which is located the Olivella spring; a short distance from the outlet is a stone arch that was part of an aqueduct, built in the time of King Ferdinand I to convey water to Naples.

== History ==
The first evidence of volcanic activity in this area dates back 400,000 years. Still, the first major eruptive phenomenon of some significance occurred about 25,000 years ago: an eruption of pumice when the top of the Somma–Vesuvius volcano collapsed, forming the caldera in which Vesuvius was later formed. Today's Mount Somma is the north rim remnant of that caldera.

== Tourism ==
Since 1995, Mount Somma has been part of the Vesuvius National Park.
