= Massa di Somma =

Massa di Somma Massa 'e Somma (Neapolitan)
- Comune
- Comune di Massa di Somma
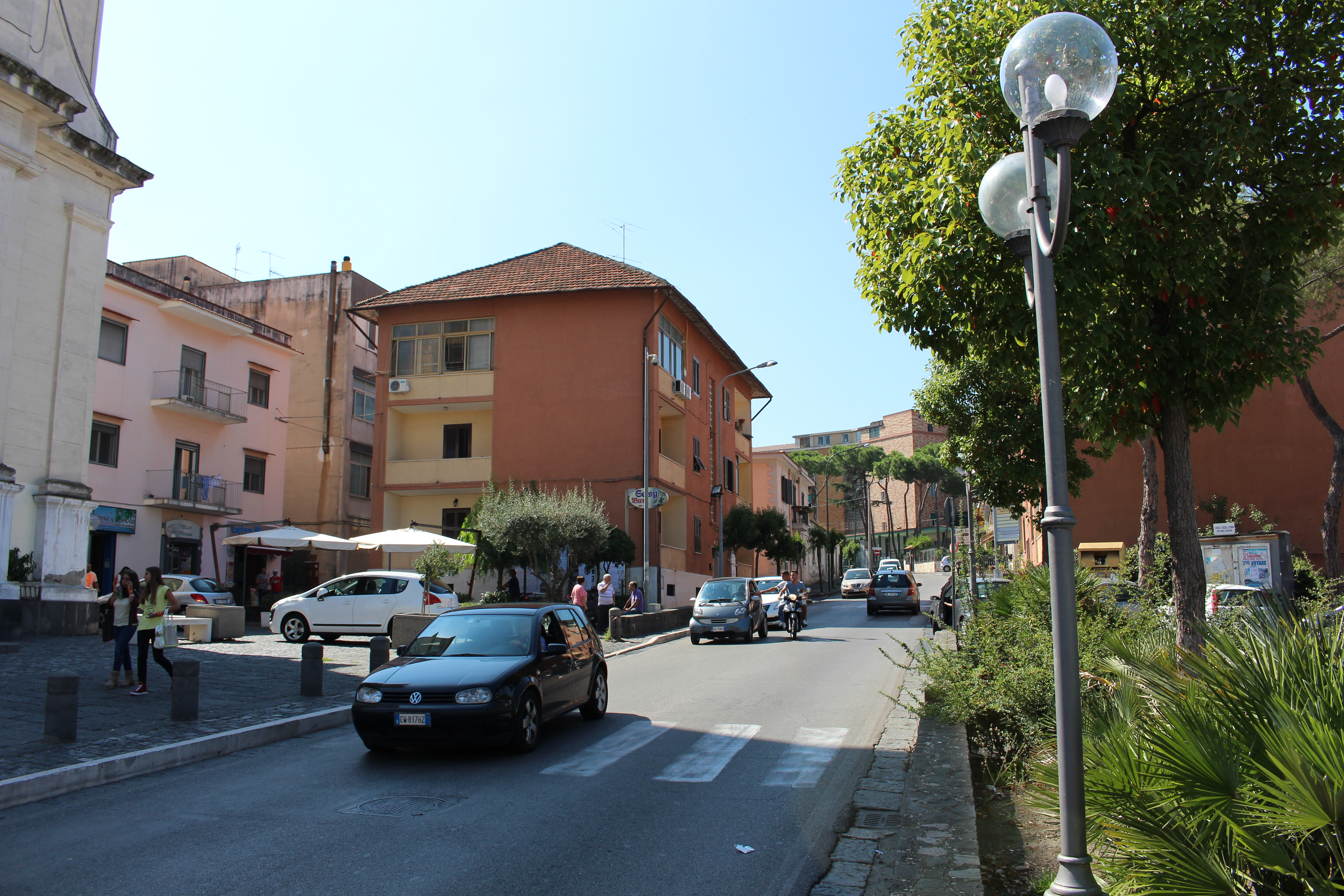

- Location within Italy Location within Campania
- Coordinates: 40°50′N 14°22′E
- Country: Italy
- Region: Campania
- Metropolitan city: Naples (NA)

Government
  - Mayor: Goacchino Madonna

Area
  - Total: 3.5 km^{2} (1.4 sq mi)
- Elevation: 175 m (574 ft)

Population (30 November 2015)
  - Total: 5,449
  - Density: 1,600/km^{2} (4,000/sq mi)
- Demonym: Massesi
- Time zone: UTC+1 (CET)
  - Summer (DST): UTC+2 (CEST)
- Postal code: 80040
- Dialing code: 081
- Website: Official website

Massa di Somma (Neapolitan: Massa 'e Somma) is a comune (municipality) in the Metropolitan City of Naples in the Italian region of Campania, located about 10 kilometres (6.2 mi) east of Naples.

Massa di Somma borders the following municipalities: Cercola, Ercolano, Pollena Trocchia, San Sebastiano al Vesuvio.
