= Licignano di Napoli =

- Frazione
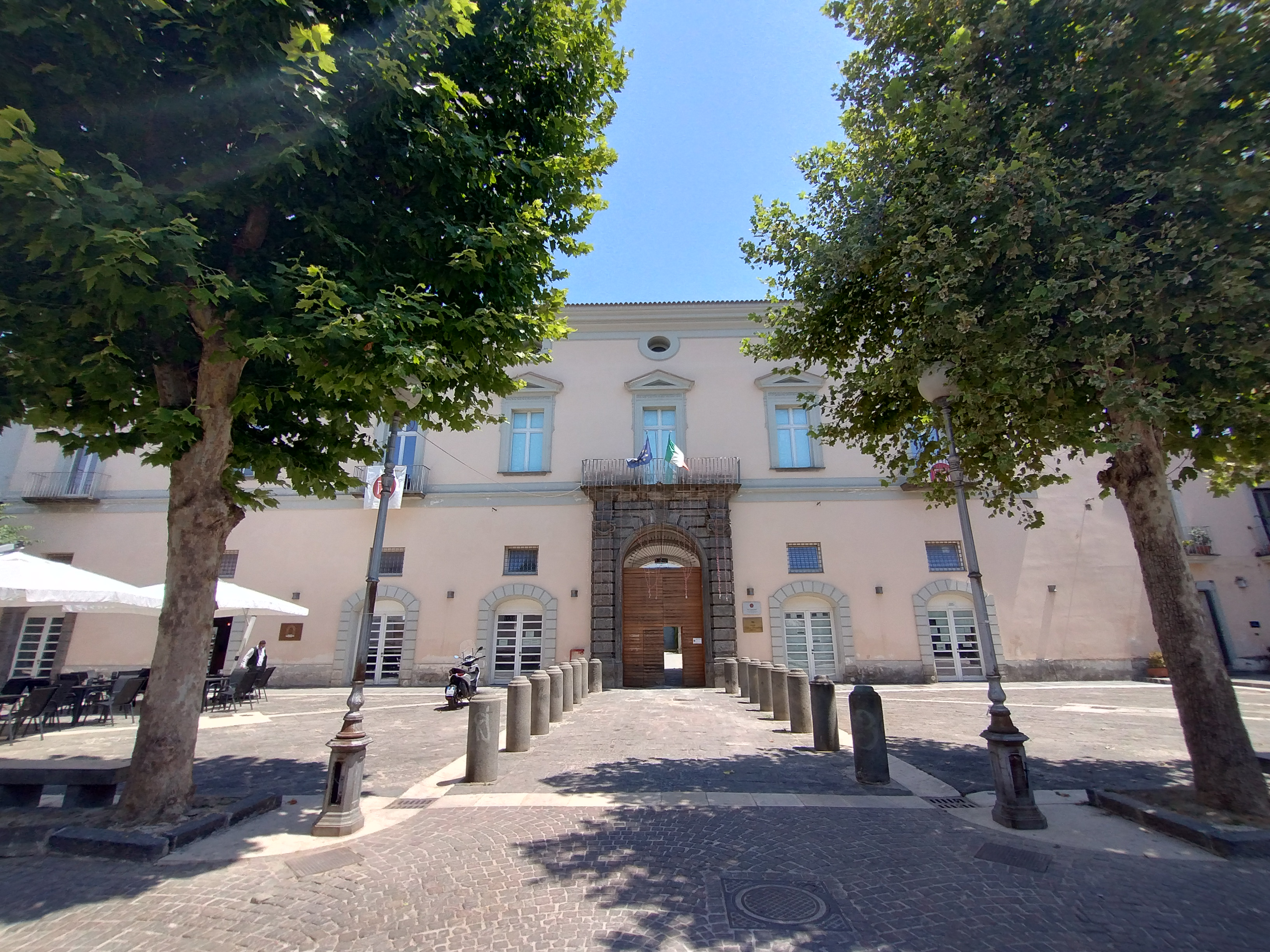
- Licignano Duke Palace

- Location of Licignano di Napoli in Italy
- Country: Italy
- Region: Campania
- Metropolitan city: Naples (NA)
- Comune: Casalnuovo di Napoli

Area
  - Total: 4.0 km^{2} (1.5 sq mi)

Population
  - Total: 6,000
  - Density: 1,500/km^{2} (3,900/sq mi)
- Demonym: Licignanesi
- Time zone: UTC+1 (CET)
  - Summer (DST): UTC+2 (CEST)
- Postal code: 80013 (80015 until 2006)
- Dialing code: 081
- Website: Official website

Licignano di Napoli is the main neighbourhood of Casalnuovo di Napoli, an Italian comune in the Metropolitan City of Naples located 11.67 km northeast of Naples.

It borders the neighbourhood of Casalnuovo, the city of Acerra and Pomigliano d'Arco, and the frazione of Tavernanova

Licignano was established as a Roman Colonia for the soldiers stationed between Naples and Nola known as Licini.

== History ==
=== The Duchy of Licignano ===
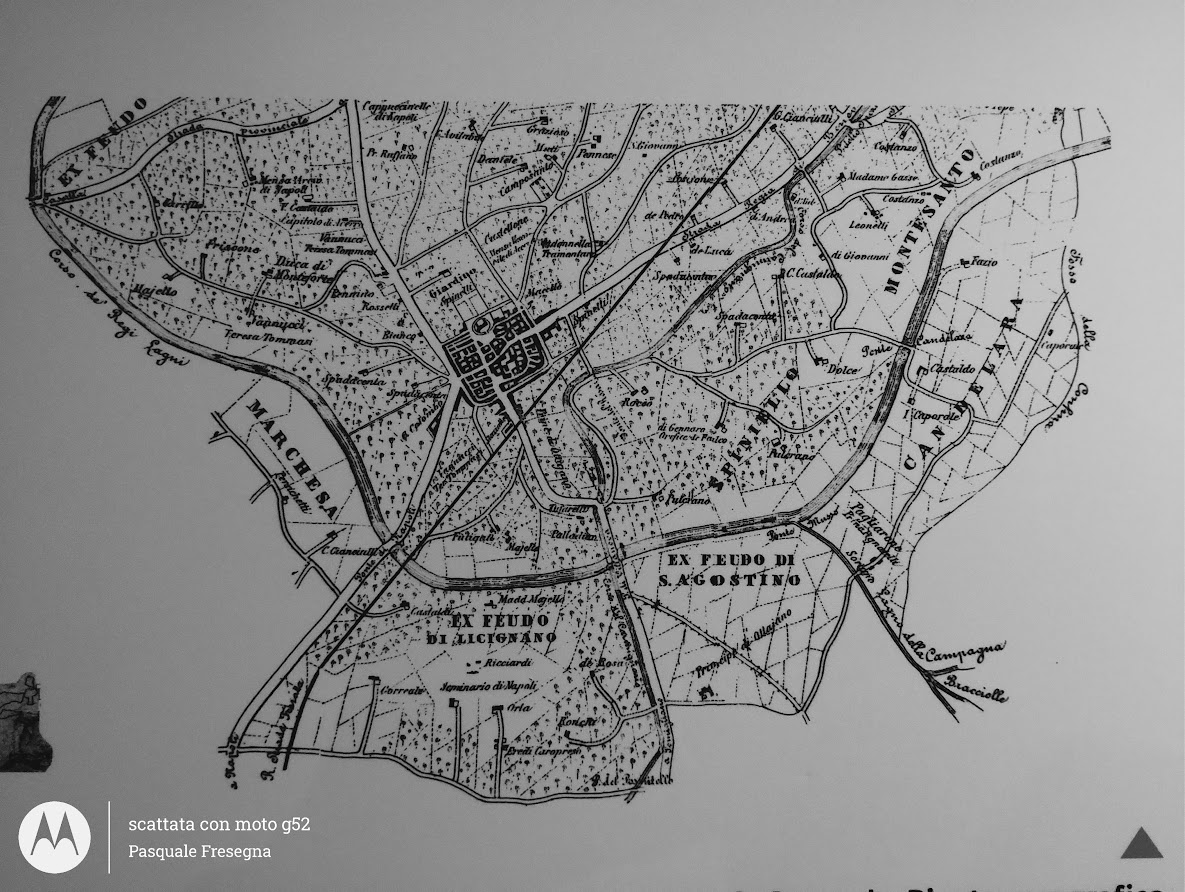
County of Acerra

Licignano was probably founded by Romans as a castrum for military operations in the Area nolana. During the Medieval ages, it became the southernmost village of the County of Acerra when Ferdinando de Cardenas sold it to Bartolo Rendina in 1534. The "Rendina" Family kept the Barony for 132 years, before selling it in 1666 to the "Salerno" Family. Gennaro Maria Salerno hired Salvatore Lanzetta in 1774 to build the new palace of the Duchy of Licignano from the old fortress (which was completed in 1780). With the end of feudalism in the Kingdom of the Two Sicilies, the Duchy was sold to Balzo of Presenzano and then to "Anfora" family while Carmine Lancellotti of Durazzo (Prince of Lauro and cadet branch of Ladislaus of Naples) bought the duchy palace in 1920. During the early years of the Kingdom of Italy, Giuseppe Anfora di Licignano was the Italian ambassador in Guatemala, Uruguay, Argentina and Paraguay (1868–1894).

=== Union with Casalnuovo ===
In the 19th century Licignano was an independent town, then district of Pomigliano, then a town again (as Licignano di Napoli) until it was forced to merge with Casalnuovo di Napoli in 1929. After the 1980 Irpinia earthquake Casalnuovo underwent an incredible population growth with the construction of new buildings to the west. In the same years Licignano gained two Circumvesuviana stations while the last one (Salice) opened in 2001 as an underground station.

== Geography ==
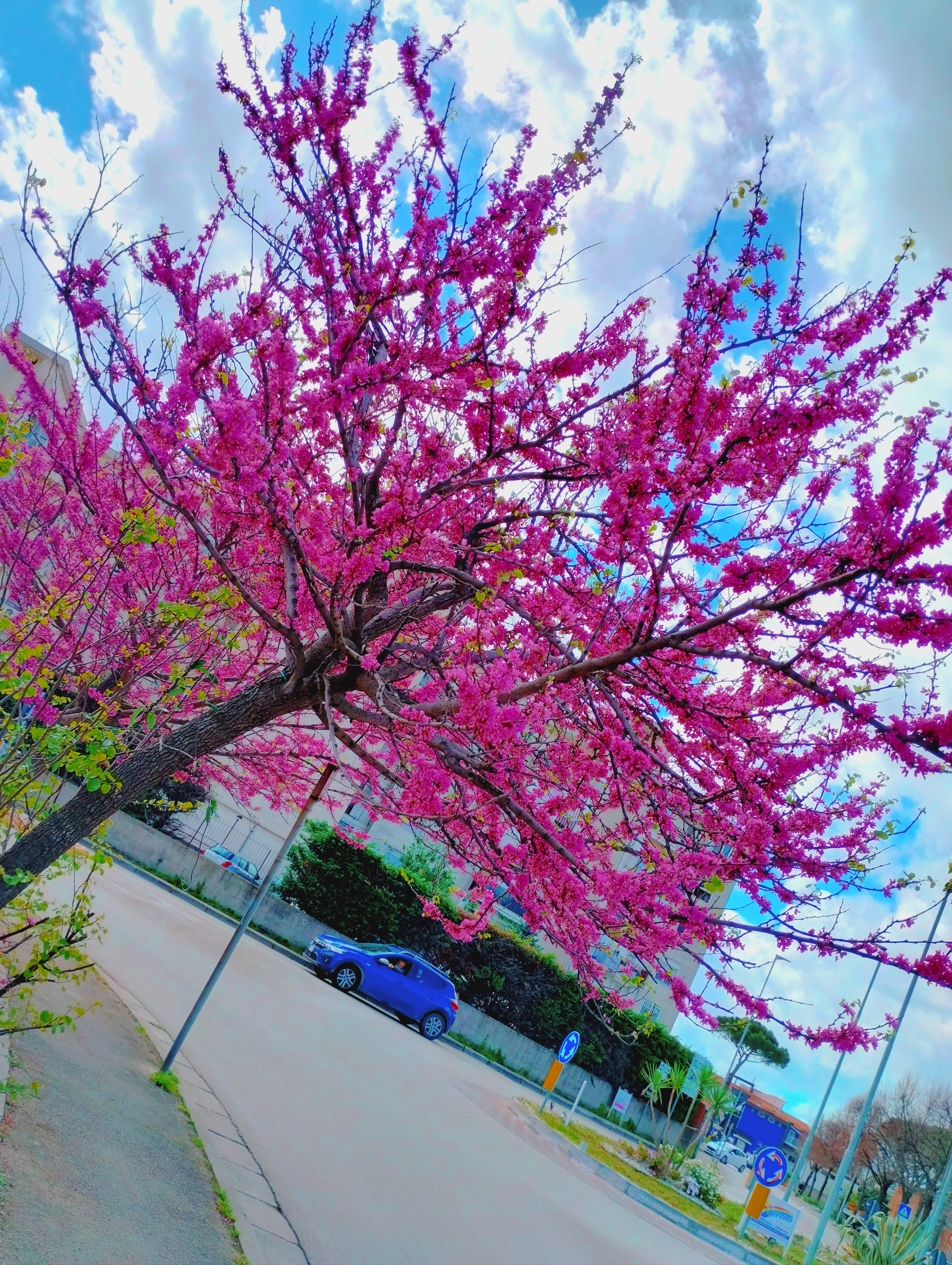
Viale dei Tigli flowers

- Licignano (old town) is centered around Via Vittorio Emanuele III with the Duchy Palace on the parallel Via XXV Luglio and the agricultural area extending from Via Vicinale San Giuliano
- Talona a district between Pomigliano and Casalnuovo built on Via Iazzetta, it has its own Circumvesuviana station (Talona) and it borders the southern side of Viale dei Tigli
- La Pigna a district between Licignano and Casalnuovo built on Via Pigna, it has its own Circumvesuviana station (La Pigna) and - along with Talona - most of the streets are named after flowers or plants.

== Transport ==
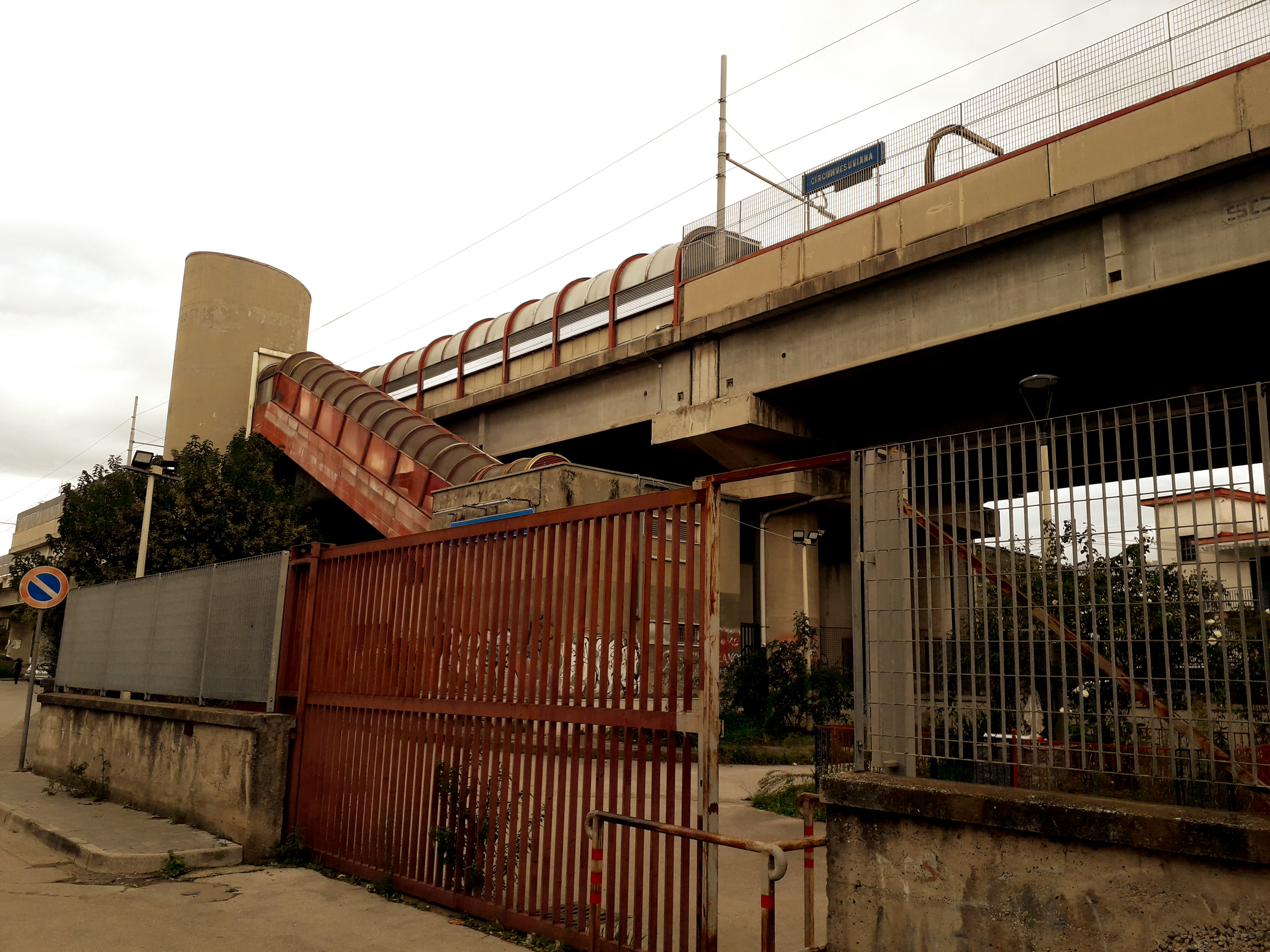
Talona EAV Station

- National Railway: Stazione di Casalnuovo FS, with its southern entrance accessible from the parking lot, connects Licignano with Naples, Fuorigrotta, Caserta and Santa Maria Capua Vetere station
- Regional Railway: Stazione di Talona and Stazione di La Pigna on the Circumvesuviana line connecting Naples with Nola, Pomigliano and Baiano
- Bus line: Number 169 connects the town with Naples

== Education ==
Licignano di Napoli has several elementary schools and the ICS "Aldo Moro" middle school along with:

- Giustino Fortunato University: the campus of the online university in Palazzo Salerno-Lancellotti (Licignano)
- IS Giancarlo Siani: is an Istituto tecnico economico and Liceo scientifico located in Via Gaudiosi
- IS Europa: a Technical school specializing in Tourism and Graphic in Viale dei Tigli
- Accademia Molière: a private film school located inside the Magic Vision in Viale dei Tigli (Licignano)

== Architecture ==
=== Churches ===
- San Nicola di Bari (1583) is a medieval chapel elevated to the status of a Church by Monsignor Scipione Salernitano, Bishop of Acerra located in Via Vittorio Emanuele III
- Maria Ss. Annunziata (1995) is the Church located in Via Pigna
- San Giuseppe chapel, dating from the XVII century founded by Luca Manna in Via Vittorio Emanuele III

=== Civil architecture ===
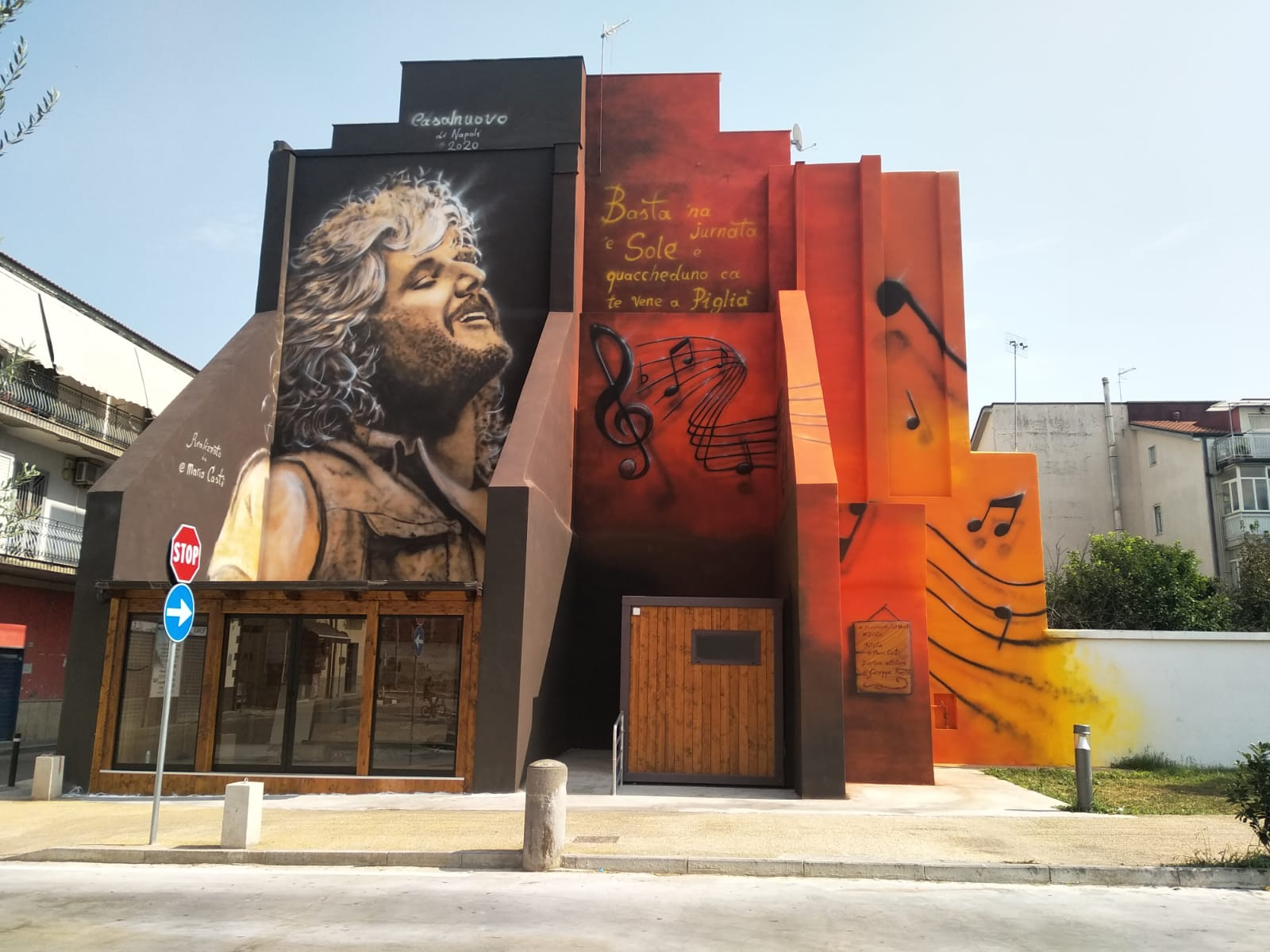
Pino Daniele Park

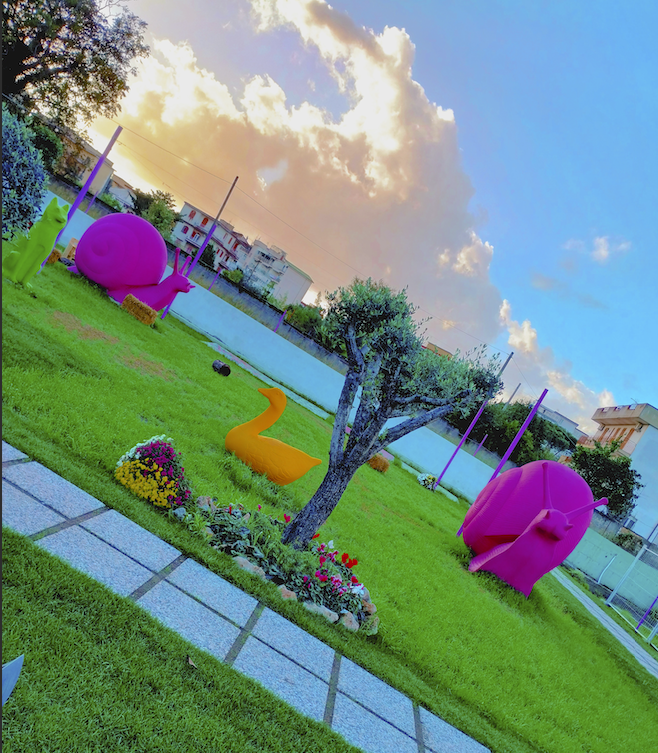
Snail Park in Via Pigna

- Palazzo Salerno-Lancillotti which was originally built as a medieval farm to store (and grind) grain for the Count of Acerra, was converted to a fortified castle during the Rendina Barony (1534–1666), then again transformed into a noble palace with Gennaro Maria Salerno, first Duke of Licignano
- Parco Urbano Pino Daniele, the main urban park created on Via Giovanni Falcone after the demolition of the east side of the old Industrial area, is connected to the Casalnuovo Rome–Cassino–Naples railway station
- Magic Vision a three-story building open in 2002 with a cinema on the east side and a post office on the west and a small shopping centre north of its parking lot
- Parco delle Chiocciole is a private park decorated with colourful giant snail-shaped sculptures

=== Streets ===
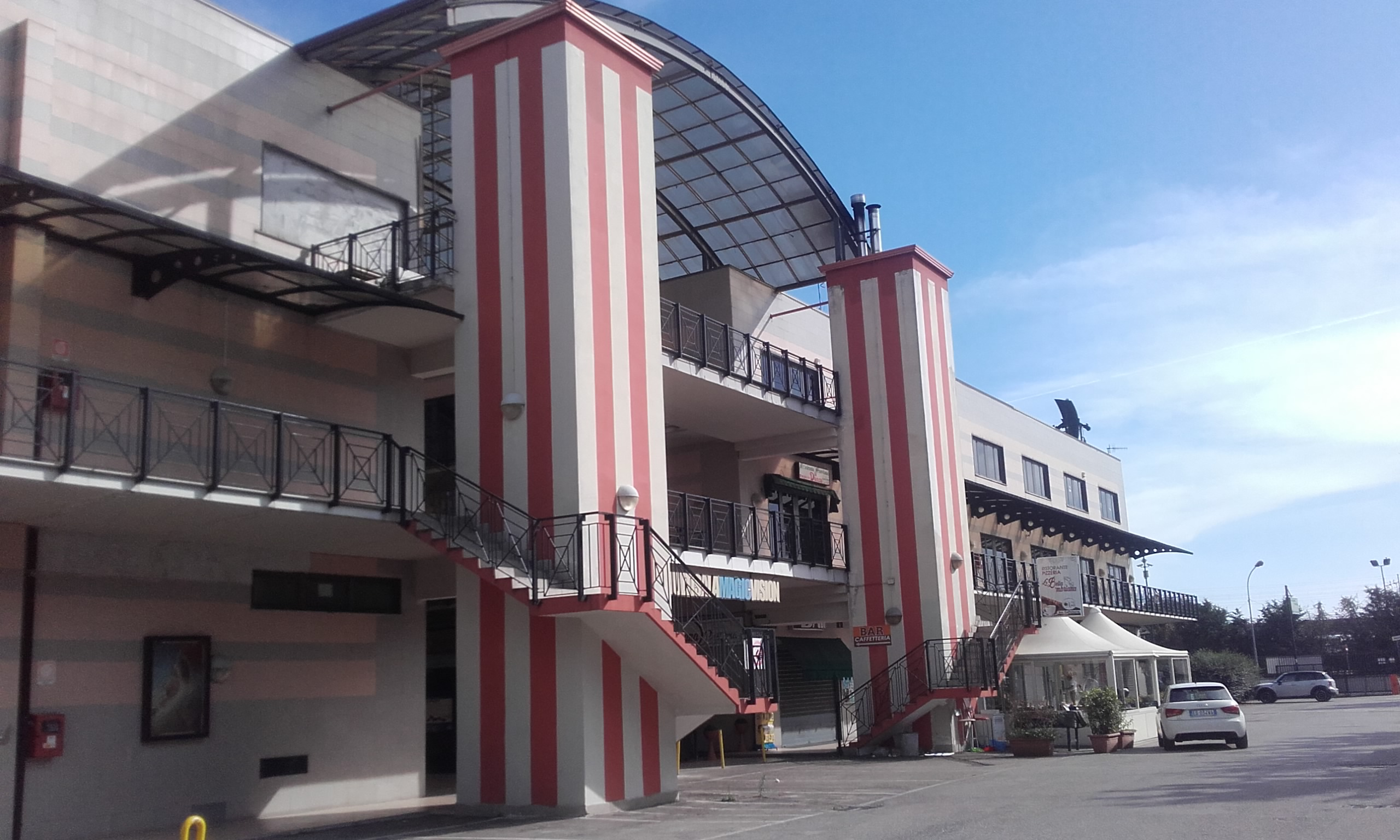
Multisala Magic Vision, Licignano Cinema

- Via Vittorio Emanuele III is the main street of Licignano and was built on the Provincial road (Italy) number 28 that connects Via Benevento in Casalnuovo with the Via Nazionale delle Puglie in Pomigliano. It was known in the past as Corso Umberto I (when Licignano was an independent town)
- Via Pigna connects the old town of Licignano with the old town of Casalnuovo and it is the northern border of the new district built during and after the 1980s
- Via Iazzetta is the main road of Talona, an area developed between Licignano and Pomigliano d'Arco, and connects the south part of the old town with the Talona train station
- Viale dei Tigli is the main parallel road of Via Vittorio Emanuele, connecting Talona with Pigna. It is one of the main business road of the city with the Magic Vision and the post office
