= Volla, Campania =

Volla 'A Vólla (Neapolitan)
- Comune
- Comune di Volla
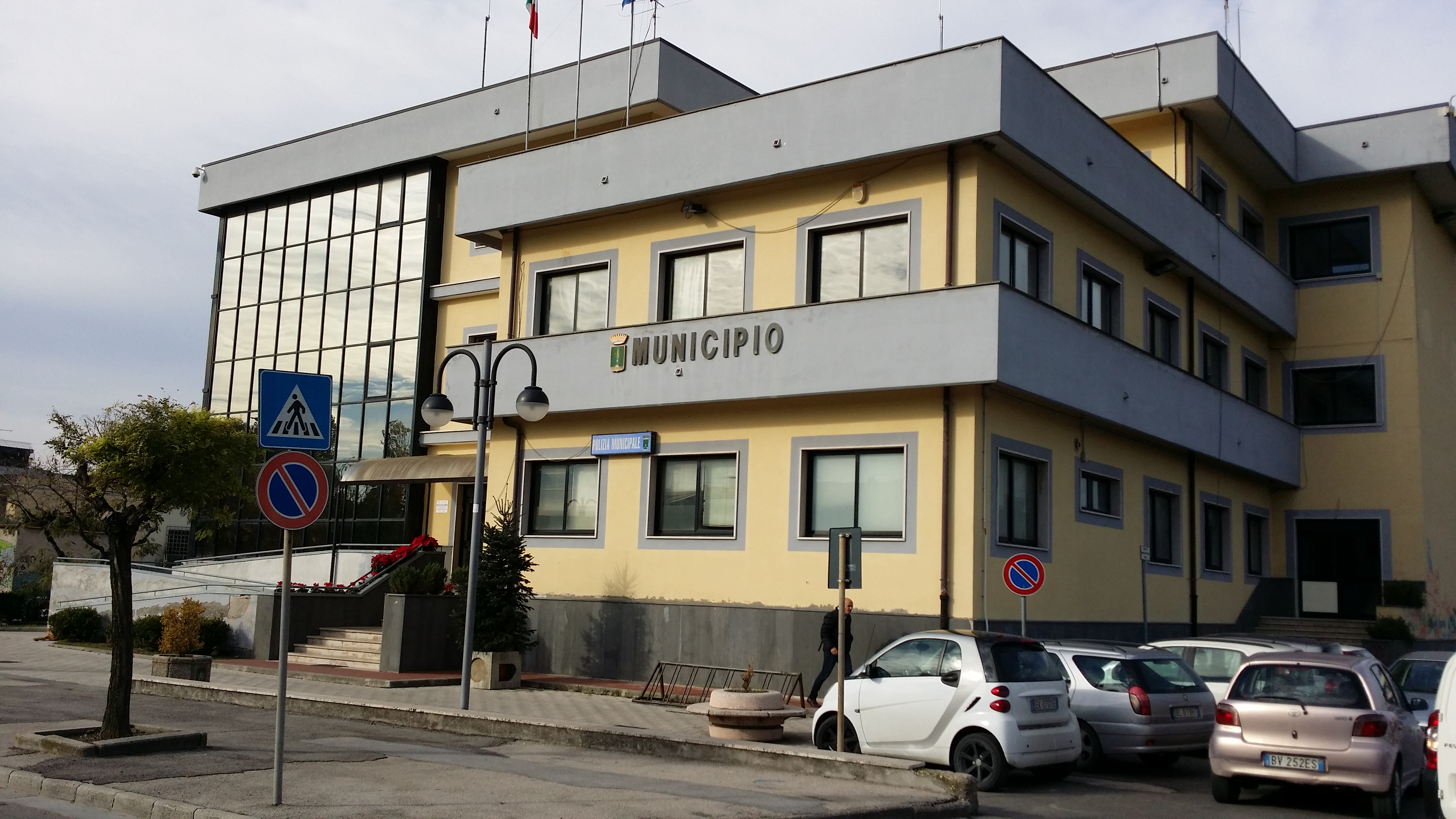

- Location within Italy Location within Campania
- Coordinates: 40°53′N 14°20′E
- Country: Italy
- Region: Campania
- Metropolitan city: Naples (NA)

Area
  - Total: 6.2 km^{2} (2.4 sq mi)
- Elevation: 25 m (82 ft)

Population (31 August 2017)
  - Total: 24,248
  - Density: 3,900/km^{2} (10,000/sq mi)
- Demonym: Vollesi
- Time zone: UTC+1 (CET)
  - Summer (DST): UTC+2 (CEST)
- Postal code: 80040
- Dialing code: 081
- Website: Official website

Volla (Neapolitan: 'A Vólla) is a comune (municipality) in the Metropolitan City of Naples in the Italian region of Campania, located about 9 kilometres (5.6 mi) northeast of Naples.

Volla borders the following municipalities: Casalnuovo di Napoli, Casoria, Cercola, Naples, Pollena Trocchia.

== Monuments and places of interest ==
- Church of the Immaculate Conception and of San Michele (1975)
- Masseria of Monteoliveto Grande
- Remains of the castle. Only the perimeter walls remain, as well as the round arches and the quadrangular tower.
