= Sant'Anastasia =

Sant'Anastasia Santa Nastasa (Neapolitan)
- Comune
- Comune di Sant'Anastasia
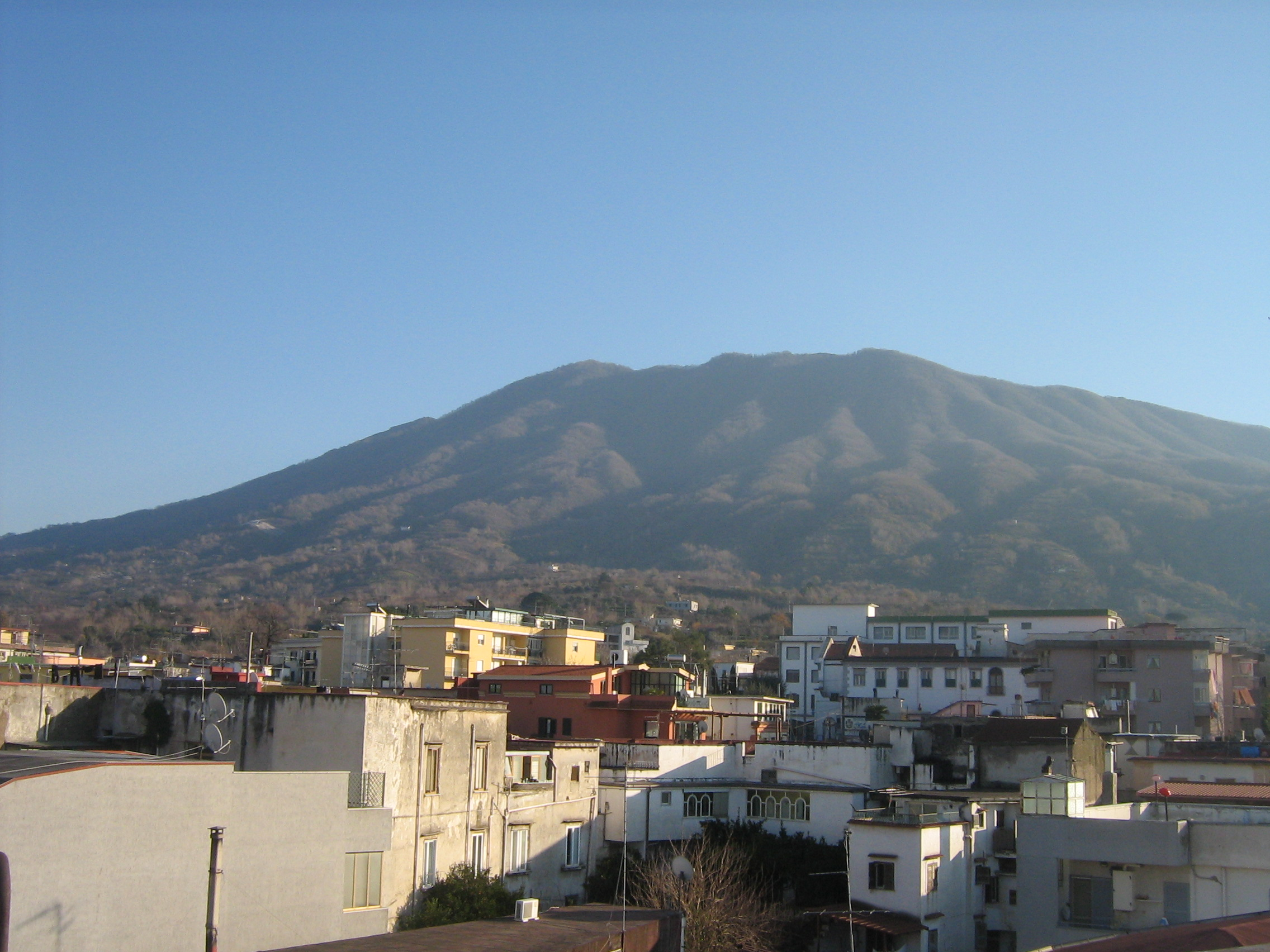
- Monte Somma from Sant'Anastasia.

- Coat of arms

- Location within Italy Location within Campania
- Coordinates: 40°52′N 14°24′E
- Country: Italy
- Region: Campania
- Metropolitan city: Naples (NA)
- Frazioni: Cavallaro - Li Dottori, Guadagni, Madonna dell'Arco, Marra-Marciano, Masseria Coscialonga, Masseria Costanzi, Ponte di Ferro, Porricelli, Romani, Sellaro, Starza Vecchia (or Starza)

Government
  - Mayor: Carmine Esposito

Area
  - Total: 18.8 km^{2} (7.3 sq mi)
- Elevation: 150 m (490 ft)

Population (30 November 2015)
  - Total: 27,665
  - Density: 1,470/km^{2} (3,810/sq mi)
- Demonym: Anastasiani
- Time zone: UTC+1 (CET)
  - Summer (DST): UTC+2 (CEST)
- Postal code: 80043 (Madonna dell'Arco), 80048 (Sant'Anastasia)
- Dialing code: 081

Sant'Anastasia (Italian: [ˌsantanastaˈziːa]; Neapolitan: Santa Nastasa) is a comune (municipality) in the Metropolitan City of Naples in the Italian region Campania, located about 13 kilometres (8 miles) northeast of Naples.

Sant'Anastasia borders the following municipalities: Casalnuovo di Napoli, Ercolano, Pollena Trocchia, Pomigliano d'Arco, Somma Vesuviana. It is located in the Vesuvius National Park, at the feet of the Monte Somma (the Vesuvius' most ancient crater).

== Twin towns - Sister cities ==
Sant'Anastasia is twinned with:

- Bethlehem, Palestine
