= Lauro =

- Comune
- Comune di Lauro
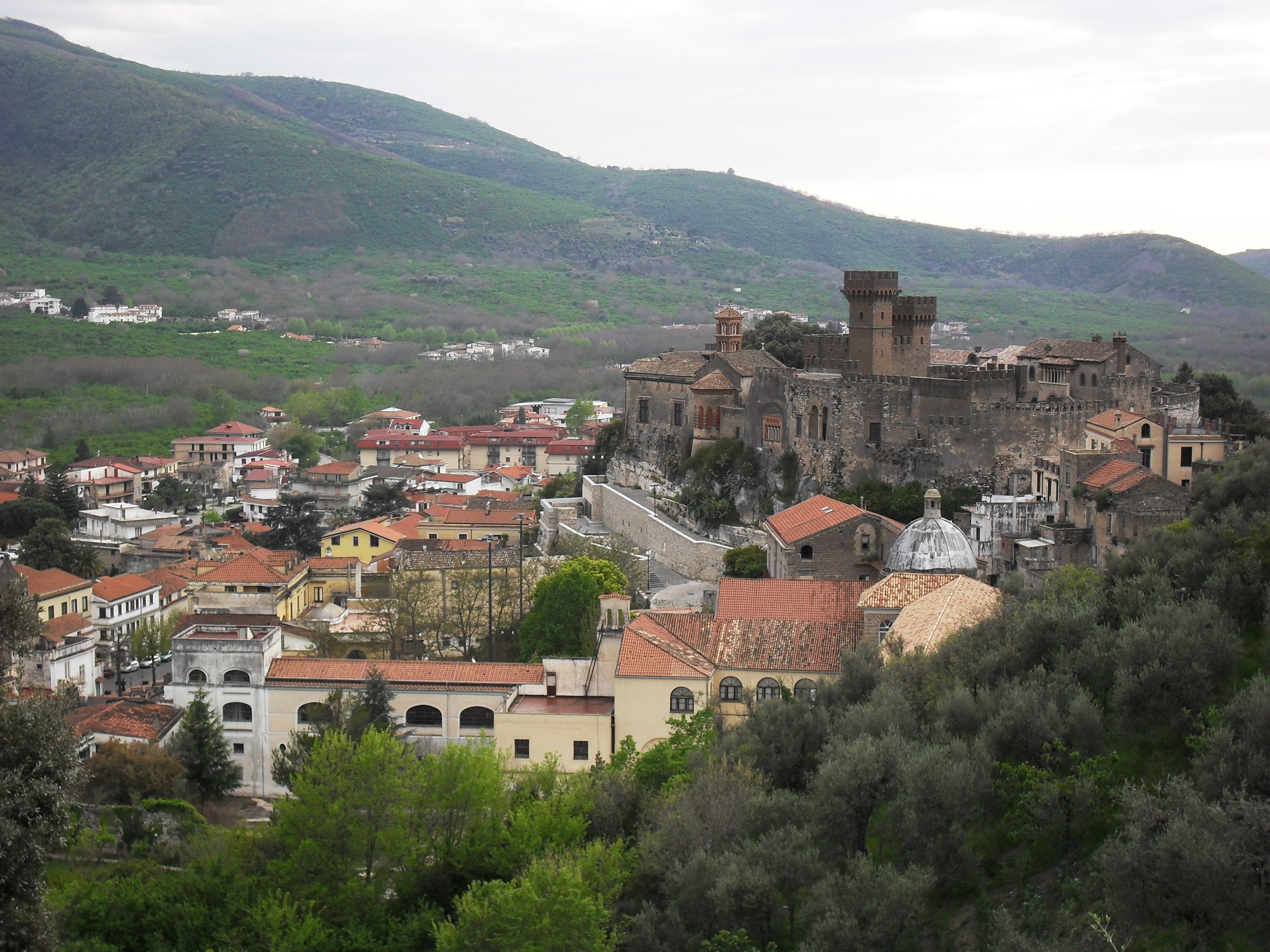

- Location within Italy Location within Campania
- Coordinates: 40°52′45″N 14°37′59″E
- Country: Italy
- Region: Campania
- Province: Avellino (AV)
- Frazioni: Fontenovella, Ima, Migliano, Pignano

Government
  - Mayor: Antonio Bossone

Area
  - Total: 11.29 km^{2} (4.36 sq mi)
- Elevation: 192 m (630 ft)

Population (31 August 2017)
  - Total: 3,441
  - Density: 304.8/km^{2} (789.4/sq mi)
- Demonym: Lauretani
- Time zone: UTC+1 (CET)
  - Summer (DST): UTC+2 (CEST)
- Postal code: 83023
- Dialing code: 081
- Patron saint: St. Roch, St. Sebastian
- Saint day: 20 January
- Website: Official website

Lauro is a town and comune (municipality) in the province of Avellino, Campania, southern Italy. It is located in lower Irpinia, in a woody valley. Sights include the remains of a 1st-century BC Roman thermae.
