= San Sebastiano al Vesuvio =

San Sebastiano al Vesuvio San Bastiano (Neapolitan)
- Comune
- Comune di San Sebastiano al Vesuvio
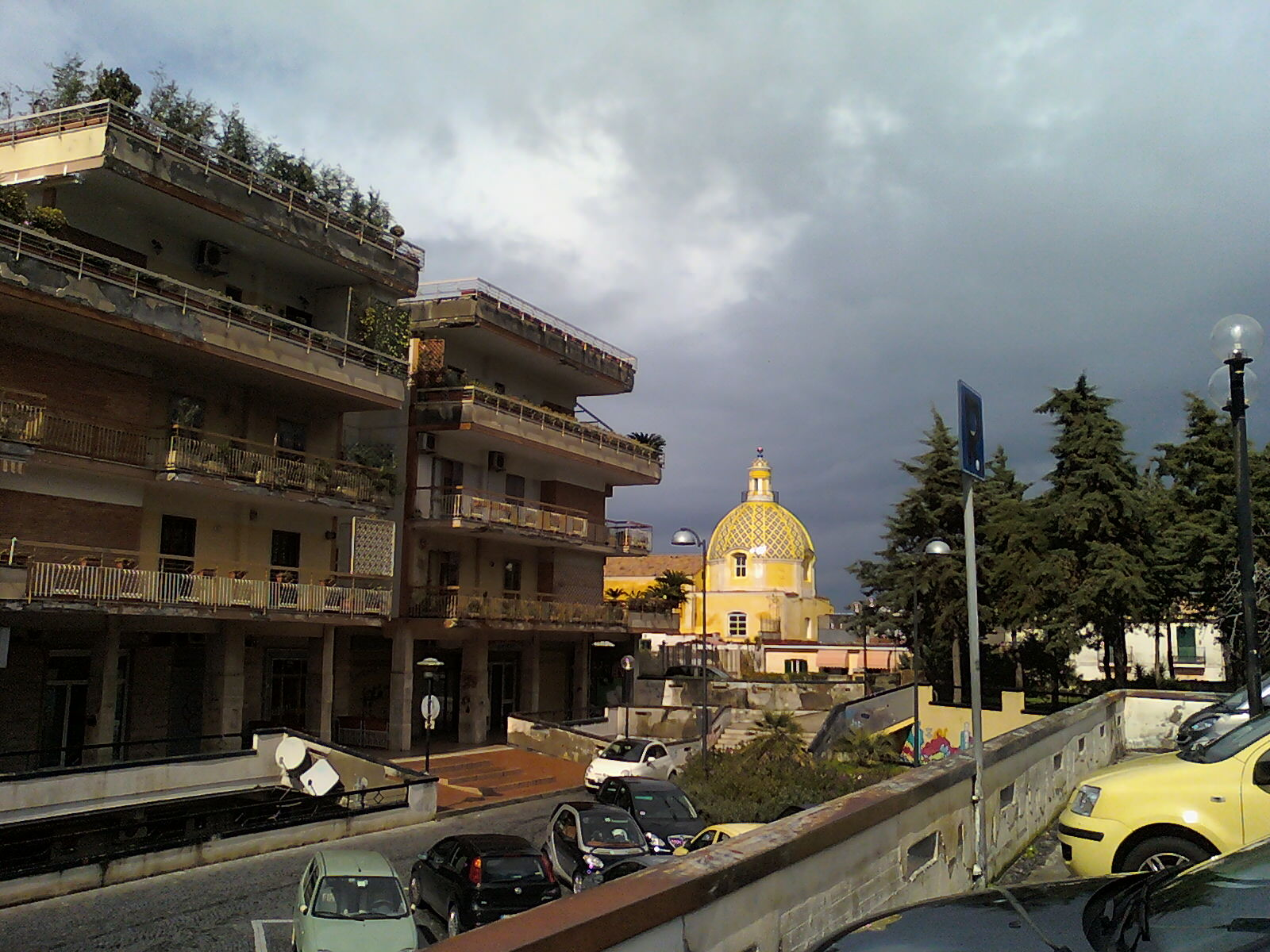

- Location within Italy Location within Campania
- Coordinates: 40°50′N 14°22′E
- Country: Italy
- Region: Campania
- Metropolitan city: Naples (NA)

Government
  - Mayor: Giuseppe Panico (since 2021)

Area
  - Total: 2 km^{2} (0.77 sq mi)
- Elevation: 175 m (574 ft)

Population (2024)
  - Total: 8,626
  - Density: 4,300/km^{2} (11,000/sq mi)
- Demonym: Sansebastianesi or Sebastianesi
- Time zone: UTC+1 (CET)
  - Summer (DST): UTC+2 (CEST)
- Postal code: 80040
- Dialing code: 081

San Sebastiano al Vesuvio (Neapolitan: San Bastiano) is a comune (municipality) in the Metropolitan City of Naples, located on the western slopes of Mount Vesuvius. Its elevation means that it is often a few degrees cooler than the neighbouring metropolis of Naples.

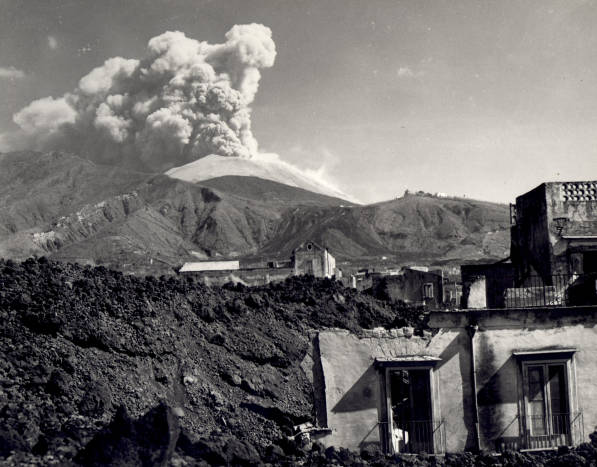
Volcanic eruption of Vesuvius in March 1944. In the foreground is the village of San Sebastiano al Vesuvio. The lava flow (in the left foreground) flowed through the village on the day before this photo was taken.

In 1944 it was destroyed and two children were killed by the eruption of Mount Vesuvius during the Allies' occupation of southern Italy, but has since been rebuilt. The main attraction is the church of San Sebastiano Martire from the 16th century.

Gaetano Filangieri, a Neapolitan jurist, was born in San Sebastiano al Vesuvius. He had an extensive correspondence with Benjamin Franklin.
