= Pollena Trocchia =

- Comune
- Comune di Pollena Trocchia
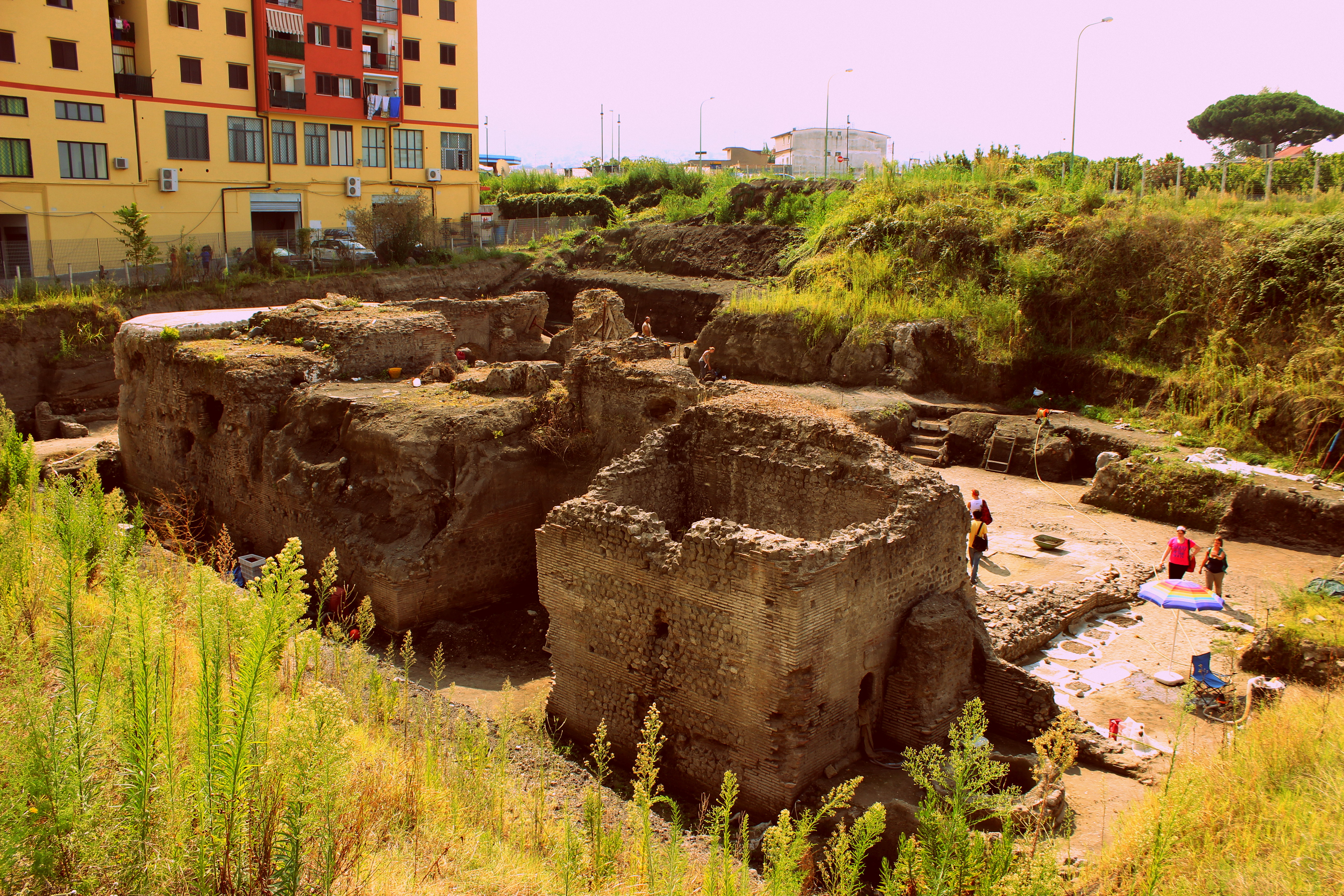
- Excavations at Pollena Trocchia

- Location within Italy Location within Campania
- Coordinates: 40°51′N 14°23′E
- Country: Italy
- Region: Campania
- Metropolitan city: Naples (NA)
- Frazioni: Guindazzi, Musci, San Gennariello-Laurenzana, Tamburiello, Trocchia

Area
  - Total: 8.1 km^{2} (3.1 sq mi)
- Elevation: 149 m (489 ft)

Population (2018-01-01)
  - Total: 13,478
  - Density: 1,700/km^{2} (4,300/sq mi)
- Time zone: UTC+1 (CET)
  - Summer (DST): UTC+2 (CEST)
- Website: Official website

Pollena Trocchia is a comune (municipality) in the Metropolitan City of Naples in the Italian region Campania, located about 11 km (6.8 mi) east of Naples.

It was created in 1811 from two already existing villages, Pollena and Trocchia, both of Samnite-Etruscan origin. Pollena took its name from the cult of Apollo, who had an important temple here in the Roman and pre-Roman ages. Both were destroyed by the 1631 eruption of Vesuvius.

The baths of an ancient Roman villa were discovered at Masseria De Carolis in Pollena Trocchia in 1988 and subsequently exposed.

== History ==
Before the Roman colonisation, this area was probably inhabited by Italic peoples like Samnites and Oscans. Later it became a resort for rich patricians of Rome or for rich estate owners who built magnificent villas in the area.

Excavations have shown that the north side of the Vesuvius volcano was equally as populated as the southern side where Pompeii and Herculaneum lie, but have not been paid as much attention by historians. The area was buried during the eruptions of Vesuvius of 472, 505 and 512 AD and not 79 AD (which buried Pompeii etc.), and so was part of the community that continued after the earlier eruption and recovered better than the territories to the south.

The baths were built after the 79 AD eruption and before the mid-2nd century.

The eruptions of Vesuvius of 472 buried the lower floors but clearance work was done and occupation then continued in the upper levels until it was completely buried in the 505 and 512 eruptions.

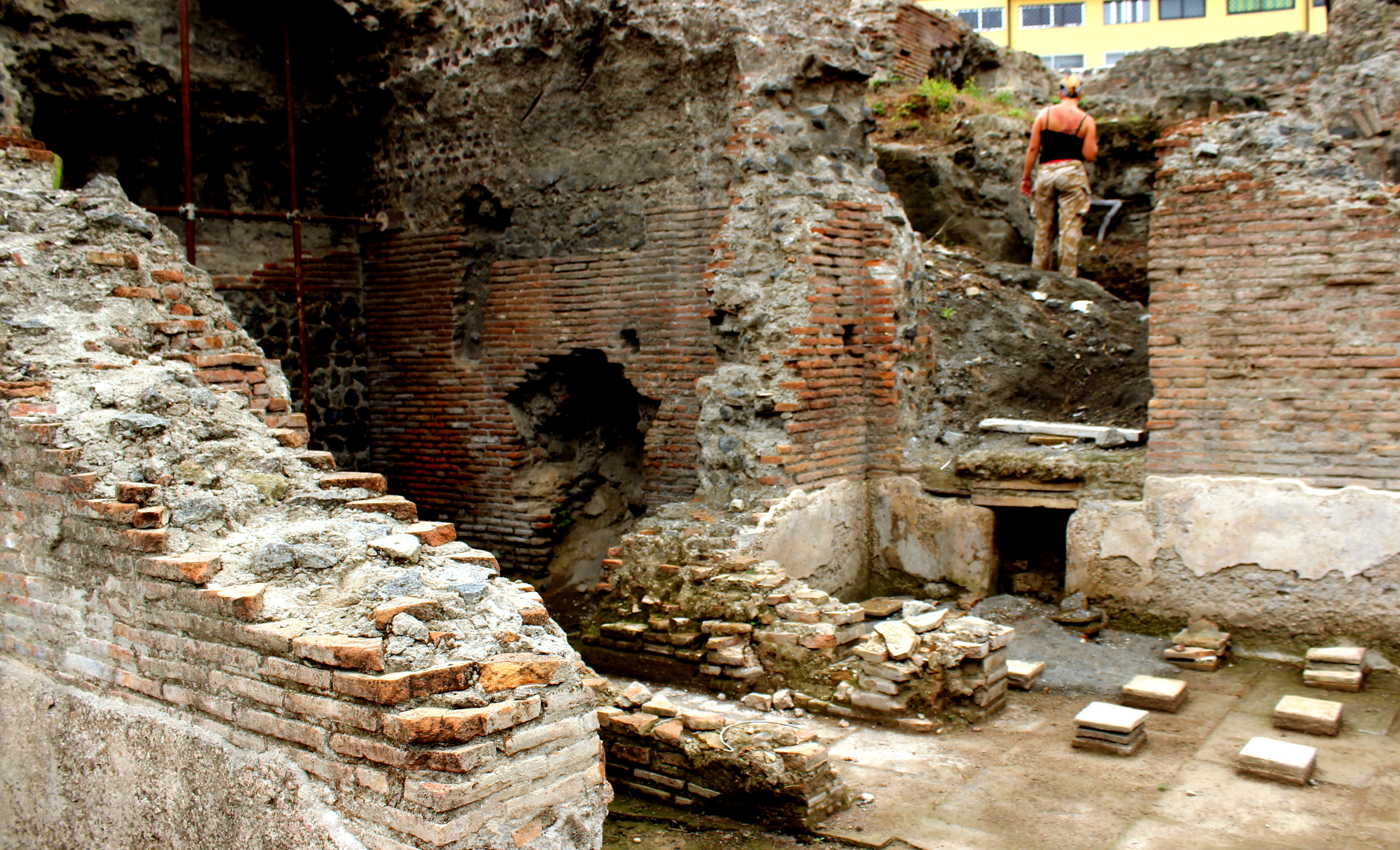
Roman baths, Pollens Trocchia

== Excavations ==
The site was first discovered during construction of apartment blocks but the builders tried to destroy it as a hindrance to their work. A brief site report classed it as agricultural and no further excavation was made. The site was forgotten and used for illegal dumping.

The Apolline Project identified the site and from 2005 it was cleared and annual excavations started.

10 rooms of baths with massive structures have been discovered on two floors. An earlier villa is believed to be situated adjacent to them on the same site.

An African sigillata lamp with the monogram of Christ (Chi-Rho), dated to the 5th century, was found.
