= Garbage =

Waste discarded by humans

- Garbage overfilling a waste container in London
- Other names: Trash, rubbish, junk, refuse, municipal solid waste
- Excludes: Metabolic waste, liquid or gaseous wastes, toxic waste
- Classification: By source: Residential, commercial, institutional, municipal, industrial, agricultural, open areas; By type: Organic, recyclable, bulky, construction/demolition, hazardous
- Global generation: 2.56 billion tons/year (2022) (projected 3.86 billion by 2050)
- Primary management: Landfill (29%); Incineration (20%); Recycling (15%); Composting (6%)
- Key treaties: Basel Convention, MARPOL Annex V

Admins, do not protect this page

Learn why:

Only admins can see this message.

This article is currently featured on the Main Page as This Week's Article for Improvement. The purpose of TWAFI is to encourage readers to make their first edits and understand how Wikipedia works. Keeping this article completely unprotected is essential to this goal.

Obviously, we need a lot of eyes to watch out for vandalism, but an increase in vandalism is not a reason to protect TWAFI. Instead, monitor this article closely and block specific problematic accounts rather than restricting access for unregistered users or applying pending changes protection. Move protection is okay for the entire week to prevent page move vandalism.

Garbage, also known as trash, (Note: Commonly used in American English and Canadian English) rubbish, (Note: Commonly used in British English and English in other Commonwealth countries) refuse, or dump, is waste discarded by humans, usually because it is no longer considered valuable or usable. The term generally excludes metabolic waste, liquid or gaseous wastes, or toxic waste. Garbage is commonly categorized as municipal solid waste.

Throughout its history, garbage has taken various forms, and treatment methods have had varying impacts on the environment. The increase in environmental pollution caused by garbage has resulted in regulation and civic organization efforts.

Garbage management includes waste prevention, reuse, recycling, composting and disposal through landfilling or incineration. Waste-management hierarchies generally prioritize prevention and recovery over disposal. According to the World Bank, 2.56 billion tons of municipal solid waste were generated in 2022 across the planet; that figure is expected to rise to 3.86 billion by 2050.

The mismanagement of human garbage has resulted in numerous ongoing environmental disasters, most notably microplastic contamination, urban litter, and the highly visible Great Pacific Garbage Patch.

== Terminology ==
The word garbage (possibly from Anglo-Norman) originally referred to chicken giblets and other entrails, as recorded in the 15th-century English manuscript A Boke of Kokery, which contains a recipe for Garbage. In modern usage, the terms garbage, trash, refuse, rubbish and waste are often used interchangeably in different regions, although some terms historically had more specific meanings. Those related terms also have distinct origins reflecting different types of discarded material. Trash, likely of Scandinavian origin (compare Old Norse tros, meaning "fallen leaves and twigs"), originally denoted woody yard debris and brushwood before broadening in North American English during the early 20th century to cover dry household discards. Rubbish derives from late Middle English from the Anglo-Norman rubbous, and may be related to Old French robe ('spoils'); it may be compared with rubble. Refuse entered English from the Old French refuser ('to reject') and has been used since the Late Middle Ages as a formal term for rejected or worthless items. Waste, related to Latin vastus ('unoccupied' or 'uncultivated'), initially described barren land before the meaning expanded to encompass unused, surplus, or discarded materials.

What constitutes garbage is naturally subjective, as materials discarded by a person or society may be considered useful or capable of restoration by another, hinting to the well known phrase "one man's trash is another man's treasure". Garbage discarded outside designated collection or disposal systems, like trash cans, is generally considered litter. Unlike waste handled through established waste management systems, litter is improperly deposited in the environment.

In the United States during the 1880s, discarded materials were commonly divided into four categories: ashes, garbage, rubbish and street sweepings. Garbage referred primarily to decomposable organic matter, including kitchen and food scraps, while rubbish encompassed dry materials such as paper, glass, metal, wood, and textiles. Food waste was sometimes fed to livestock, processed to recover fats and oils, or converted into fertilizer, while rubbish could be recovered and reused in manufacturing. Some of these distinctions remain today, and a more general term is "municipal solid waste".

The distinction between wet and dry waste influenced early municipal collection and disposal practices. Separating organic waste remains important in modern waste management, particularly for recycling and biological treatment. In the European Union, the Waste Framework Directive required member states to ensure that bio-waste is separated and recycled at source or collected separately subject to specific exceptions.

== History ==
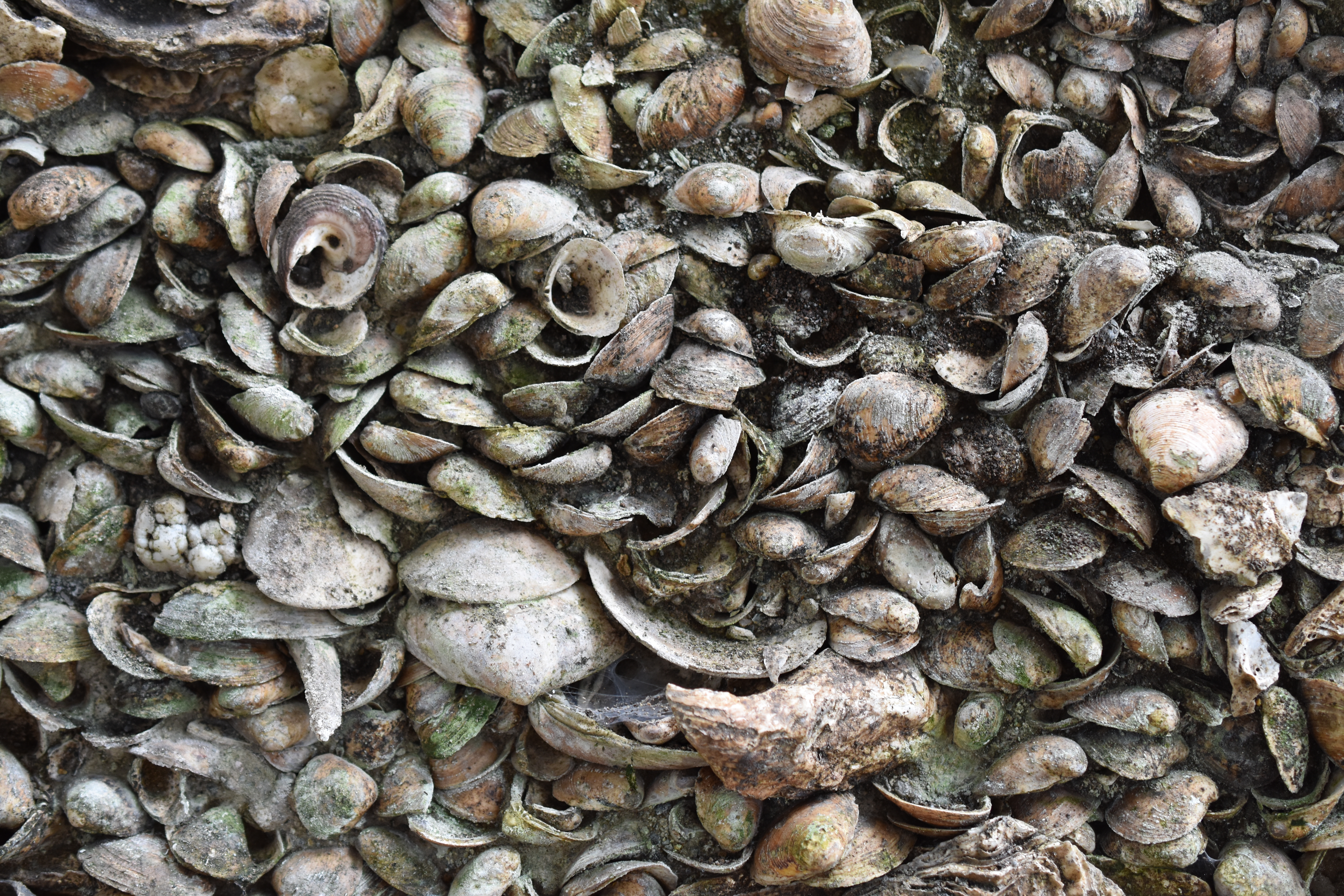
Detail from a midden dating from the Stone Age in Japan, consisting primarily of shellfish waste

=== Prehistoric and ancient times ===
For much of human history, garbage has been a part of daily life. Some of the earliest archaeological evidence of garbage disposal includes pits of oyster shells and animal bones left over from communal eating practices, as well as stone fragments discarded from toolmaking. The degree to which groups of early humans engaged in agriculture can be estimated by examining the type and quality of animal bones in their garbage. Garbage from prehistoric or pre-civilization humans was collected into mounds called middens, which might contain things such as "a mix of discarded food, charcoal, shell tools, and broken pottery". In the Neolithic city of Çatalhöyük, garbage was disposed of between homes. Over time, it became a layer that fused buildings together, and later a sublayer upon which other houses were constructed.

In ancient Mesopotamia, cities grew larger and waste management systems began to emerge. Both Abu Salabikh and Tell Brak had designated areas for garbage disposal. Garbage piles were usually seen as places to be avoided, but there is no clear evidence that garbage was understood to be a vector for diseases.

The Indus Valley Civilization had one of the earliest known systems for dealing with wastewater and garbage. The city of Mohenjo-daro had an advanced system for removing sewage. In some parts of the city, every house had a bathroom. Wastewater flowed from the houses into the street drains, and some of it ran into pits at street level. Some houses used clay (terracotta) pipes to carry waste along the street. The drains, cesspits, and soak pits had to be kept clear for continued use and were thought to have needed regular cleaning by a large team of workers. Similar drainage systems have been found at other Harappan cities and towns, including Harappa, Dholavira, Rakhigarhi, Lothal, and Kalibangan. Not all waste went into drains and pits. Some abandoned buildings are known to be filled with garbage over time. At Harappa, people living nearby used the streets as dumping areas, so it has been suggested that wooden carts took garbage away from the streets and storage pits, and that the streets were swept regularly. Smaller rural settlements seem to have used simpler methods. For example, in the village of Farmana garbage pits held broken pottery and possibly food waste, and ash, bones and leftover craft material were dumped on the streets.

In the Minoan civilization, solid waste in the capital of Knossos was put into large pits, covered at intervals with layers of earth. Athens, Greece passed a waste management law in 500 BC requiring waste to be disposed at least 1 mile (1.6 km) from the city to reduce disease spread and keep the city clean. The city also removed waste outside city boundaries when it came under imminent attack to prevent attackers from scaling over city walls using the garbage piles.

In Ancient Rome, sophisticated aqueducts and other systems for waste removal were built, vast groups of sewers were built, and became known as the Cloaca Maxima. They emptied into the Tiber river, resulting in a large concentration of pollution. There were different qualities of waste management practices depending on one's social standing. Due to the abundant usage of amphora, an artificial mound, the Monte Testaccio, was formed composing almost entirely of discarded amphora. Access to plumbing as well as sewers was considered a status in Roman culture. Compared to Mesopotamia, Roman waste management was more sophisticated and also more dependent on one's socioeconomic status.

In ancient China, successive dynasties regulated urban refuse through legal penalties and state-organized collection. During the Tang dynasty, authorities punished public littering with caning, while private entrepreneurs profited by collecting urban waste and human excreta to sell to farmers as fertilizer. By the Song dynasty, the government established dedicated street-cleaning agencies employing hundreds of official scavengers to maintain urban sanitation.

=== Middle Ages ===
The Olmec civilization had a systemic way of managing waste. They deposited household garbage into trash-filled pits, open-air middens, and managed water using stone aqueducts. The Olmecs relied on biodegradable materials such as wood, woven fibers, and gourds for everyday use. Because of this, their primarily organic waste decayed rapidly in the humid climate of the Gulf Coast of Mexico. Olmec garbage deposits filled with layers of broken pottery helped archaeologists Michael Coe and Richard Diehl establish the first chronological timeline of Olmec history.

In Mesoamerica, organic waste was used to cultivate gardens known as chinampas. Chinampas were highly productive, producing up to four crops a year and accounting for two-thirds of the food consumed in the city. The Aztec Empire especially valued human waste, which was collected by pepenilias (scavengers) and sold in the markets of Mexico-Tenochtitlan. Urine was also used as a mordant in the dyeing of fabrics. During the reign of Moctezuma II, dumping waste and littering were forbidden, and the penalty could reach a sentence of death. Garbage that could not be recycled was burned, sometimes at night to illuminate public spaces. The Aztec waste management system was eventually dismantled by the Spanish when they colonized the region.

In medieval London, ordinances dealing with the cleansing of streets and the removal of refuse were issued from the 13th century onwards, and were carried out by ward-appointed officers such as rakers and scavengers. Complaints about butchers' waste and other refuse dumped in watercourses and ditches led to an English statute of 1388 that forbade depositing such waste in or near towns and cities because of the threat it posed to public health.

In China, the Southern Song capital Hangzhou had an organized system for removing urban waste: designated night soil collectors gathered household waste every day, each serving their own area, and groups of boats carried garbage and night soil out of the city, much of it to be used as fertilizer on surrounding farmland.

Elsewhere in medieval Europe, Italian city governments also legislated against urban waste on health grounds. In 1283–84 the rulers of Treviso ordered that dung and waste be removed quickly from the streets because they were believed to infect the air and spread disease, and in 1296 Pistoia ordered the expulsion of noxious trades such as tanning for the same reason. In 1416 the advisors of Charles VI of France ordered the demolition of the Great Butchery in Paris and its replacement with flesh markets outside the city walls, to protect public health.

In the medieval Islamic world, public sanitation was among the duties of the muhtasib, a city official who, with his inspectors, worked to keep streets clean and to regulate dumping. Slaughtering, fish preparation and tanning were restricted to designated areas, and spoiled fish had to be disposed of on a midden beyond the city limits. In 11th-century Baghdad, the caliph al-Muqtadi forbade the keepers of public baths to empty their waste water into the Tigris and had special disposal pits dug instead, and efforts were made to stop garbage from being thrown into the river.

In al-Andalus, Córdoba developed an extensive sewer network under the Umayyad Caliphate, and latrines and cesspits were common in houses by the 10th century. Residents were responsible for keeping the street in front of their homes clean, while officials such as the market inspector and the qadi could intervene in disputes over sanitation or to prevent water contamination.

=== Early modern era ===
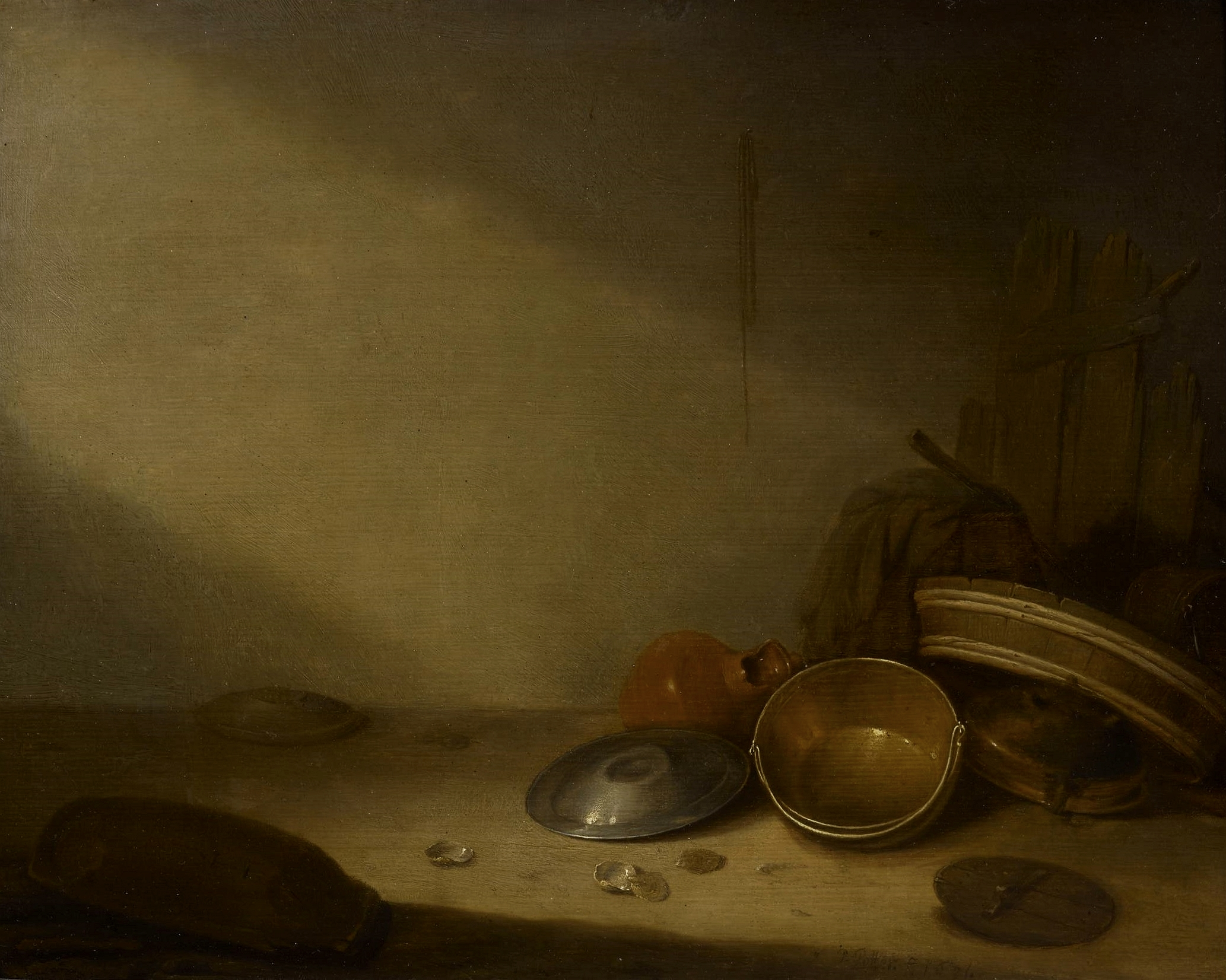
A 1631 still life painting by Dutch painter Pieter Symonsz Potter showing a pile of garbage

In 1552, John Shakespeare, the father of William Shakespeare, kept and operated a muckhill on a block of land near where he lived. The muckhill functioned as a communal compost heap, gathering together organic materials including ammonia-rich urine, which were later actively harvested for John Shakespeare's gloving and tanning business. He was charged one shilling (equivalent to £24 in 2025) by the Stratford-upon-Avon municipal authorities as a "standard municipal waste-disposal toll" that operators paid for the right to collect materials from the muckhill. Rather than waste accumulating haphazardly in the streets or being simply discarded without thought, John Shakespeare's fine is evidence of the fact that early modern England had complex systems of waste management that were operated at a local level. These included formal requirements for clearing gutters, repairing pavement, and placing waste in neatly heaped piles in designated areas that would then be used to fertilize fields once they had decomposed.

In Colonial America, the early inhabitants of Jamestown, Virginia, left large garbage pits that have recently been excavated by archaeologists. In particular, pits that date from the so-called Starving Time of 1609 have revealed the butchered remains of dogs, cats, rats, snakes, and marine life. Recent identification of the partial remains of a 14-year-old girl, named "Jane" by researchers, confirmed that desperate colonists resorted to cannibalism during the famine and discarded human remains as garbage.

Filth was a major problem faced in early colonial American cities. Animals roamed at will, and hogs often served as the only garbage collectors. In colonial Baltimore, Maryland, the local government attempted to address the issue through legislation in 1751 by authorizing advertisements to be put up informing residents to remove stinking fish, dead creatures, or carrion from "their Lotts or in the Streets near their Doors".

Japan in the Tokugawa period (1603–1867) had night soil markets where human waste (shimogoe) was collected and sold to farmers as agricultural fertilizer in exchange for items such as food, straw or cash. The desire and demand for excrement and urine fluctuated by season, and normally peak demand came in spring and early summer when crops needed heavy fertilizing.

=== Modern era ===
British anti-littering poster, c. 1939–1946

Prior to the 20th century, most Americans produced comparatively less garbage. Habits of reuse meant that food scraps were boiled into soup or fed to animals. The 1835 edition of The American Frugal Housewife advised readers to carefully sort their food waste: slop pails were to be kept for pig feed, saving fats for a "grease-pot" to be used for cooking and soapmaking. Durable items were kept for later use or passed on to others or children. Broken items were repaired or dismantled for parts. Items which could not be used in any other way were burnt for heating or cooking.

In cities, rag-and-bone men exchanged manufactured goods like tea kettles and buttons for bones, paper, old iron, bottles, and rags. They sold these items on to dealers for reuse: grease and gelatin could be extracted from bones, or the bones could be used to make knife handles, bone meal fertilizer, or turned into charcoal for the refining of sugar. Bottles were refilled. Scavenging was a chore and pastime for children, who sold items to dealers in exchange for food and coal.

By the turn of the 20th century, mass production and distribution were creating more garbage than ever. Municipal garbage collection started to replace these earlier forms of dealing with garbage. Starting in the late 19th century, Progressive Era reformers concerned with public health created laws and bodies for sanitary reform. Garbage and scavenging began to be treated as a social problem. It was noted that the poor tended to reuse most of their waste, and that it was necessary "to educate and force the people to deposit their wastes in proper receptacles."

Horse-drawn garbage wagon of the Department of Health and Sanitation, Seattle, Washington, US, October 28, 1915. These horse-drawn wagons were replaced across the city by motorized trucks by the early 1930s.

During the Great Depression, the thrifty reuse of waste had a resurgence. Flour and feed sacks were printed with pleasing patterns, so that customers could sew them into clothing or quilts instead of throwing them away. Manufacturers encouraged product containers of all kinds to be reused for various purposes. Hobbyist magazines promoted ways to fix or make things without spending money. During World War II, scrap drives for materials like rubber, metals, paper, and cloth continued to encourage salvage.

Sanitary landfills, first introduced in the 1930s, became increasingly popular after the war. In a sanitary landfill, garbage is covered with dirt on a daily basis, reducing odors and pests. The sale of disposable products grew quickly after the war too, and "disposability" became a selling point. Disposable products and packages were seen by consumers as clean and convenient. In his 1960 book The Waste Makers, Vance Packard commented that "Historians, I suspect, may allude to this as the Throwaway Age."

In Italy, mafia organizations of Naples hold significant control over the waste management industry. Their political and economic control of the waste disposal significantly contributes to the mob's 7 percent of Italy's GNP, and resulted in the Naples waste management crisis. Their illegal dumping and burning of harmful waste has poisoned drinking water and farmland, described as ecomafia, and increased instances of cancer, rare diseases, and animals with deformities.

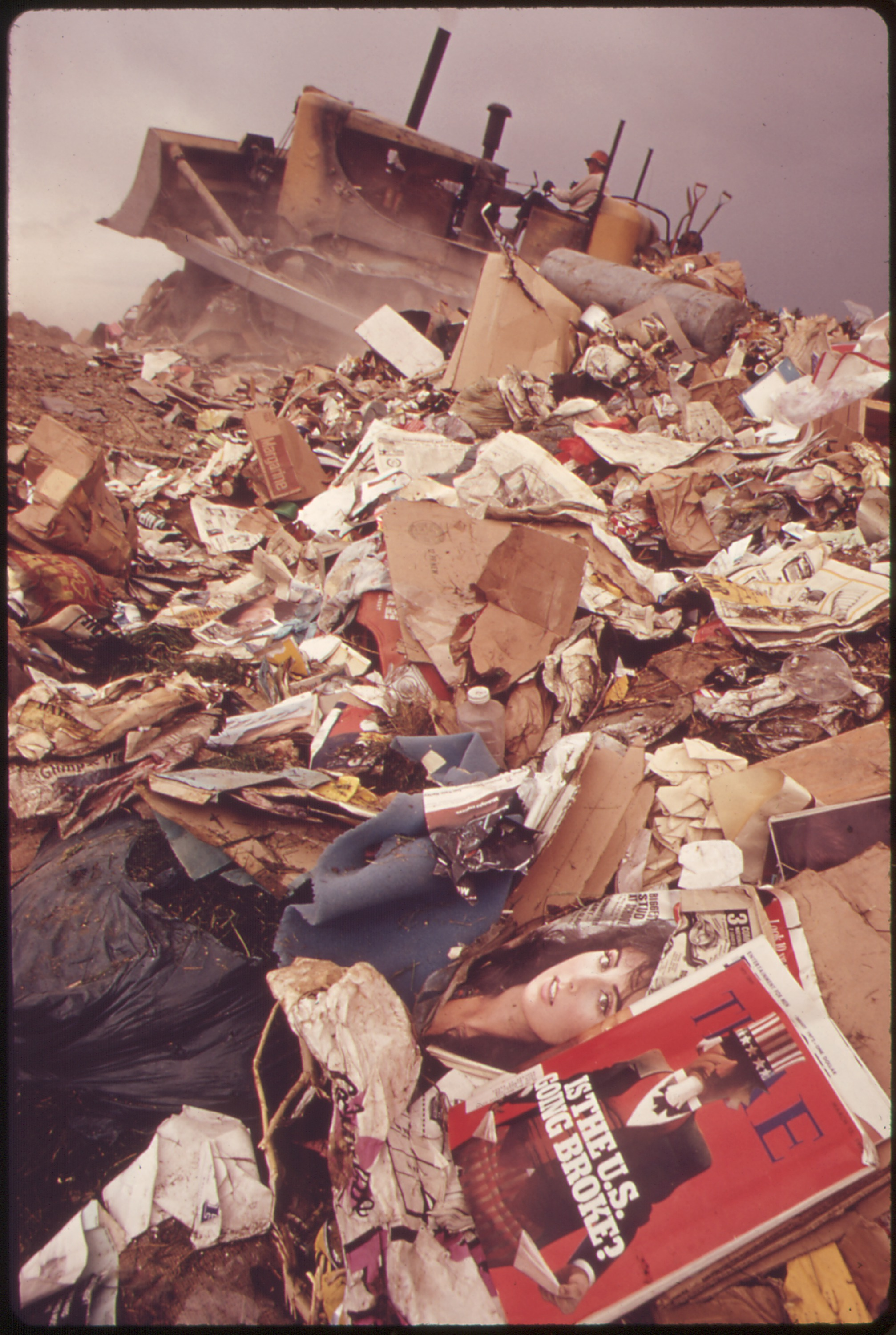
A landfill in Colorado in 1972

In the 1950s in the United States, the plastics industry worked to promote plastics as cheap, disposable products that consumers could throw away after a single use. In 1956, Lloyd Stouffer, editor of Modern Packaging, said at a convention for the Society of the Plastics Industry that "the future of plastics is in the trash can". In 1963, he praised the success of the industry in changing consumer mindsets towards disposable plastics. In the 1970s, public concern increased about plastic garbage, especially as it contributed to pollution. Companies promoted plastic recycling to avoid bans and other regulations, despite internal research showing that it would not be effective at scale in reducing plastic garbage. As the modern environmental movement grew in the United States, the Tucson Garbage Project studied people's statements and behaviors related to garbage. Based on their surveys in the 1980s, people believed that fast food containers, disposable diapers, and polystyrene foam took up at least 40% of the space in landfills, but these materials were under 5% of landfills by volume, while landfills had more paper and construction and demolition waste than people expected.

In 2002, when annual global waste volume began to be documented, the annual waste volume was 680 million tonnes. The volume increased to 1.3 billion tonnes in 2012 and further increased to 2.6 billion tonnes in 2022. As of 2026, the most garbage-producing countries by absolute volume are China, the United States, India, Brazil, and Indonesia. The largest garbage-producing countries per capita are the higher-income nations of the United States, Canada, and Norway.

Global plastic production increased from 15 million tonnes in 1964 to 311 million tonnes in 2014 and could double over the following 20 years. And now, after its first use, 95% of the economic value of plastic packaging material is not retained. A 2016 report projected that plastic packaging production could quadruple by 2050. If production rises, the amount of plastic waste could also increase, although the actual amount will depend on how much plastic is reused, recycled, or otherwise managed.

=== Use in land reclamation ===
Some cities reused garbage as construction material. In the 18th century, New Amsterdam used discarded ship ballast materials and locally produced garbage to expand Manhattan Island. Water lots were sold for one twenty-fifth of the price of land lots. In the 19th century, after the Great Chicago Fire, Chicago began dumping charred debris into swamps around Lake Michigan. Over time, authorities deliberately dumped household waste to create solid land for recreational uses.

== Classification ==
There are two methods of waste classification: source-based classification and type-based classification. The former classifies waste depending on where it originated and the latter classifies waste depending on a generalization of the majority of substances that compose it. The source-based classifications of solid waste are residential, commercial, institutional, municipal, industrial, agricultural, and open areas. On the other hand, type-based classifications include anthropogenic organic waste ash and residue, human waste, bulky waste, street waste, biodegradable and non-biodegradable waste, electronic waste, recyclable waste, dead animals, abandoned vehicles, construction and demolition waste, and hazardous waste.

Liquid waste is generally not classified as garbage, but many forms of garbage contain substantial amounts of moisture, which can be released through compaction and decomposition where large quantities of garbage are kept. This moisture can be exacerbated by rain or other environmental moisture passing through the garbage, producing a foul-smelling leachate colloquially known as "garbage water".

== Treatment ==
Garbagemen loading waste into a garbage truck by hand in Japan, 2013

The treatment and management of garbage varies markedly across the world based on income level and region. In high-income countries nearly 100% of municipal solid waste is managed in controlled facilities, whereas only 3% of waste in low-income countries is managed in controlled facilities, with most waste either uncollected or disposed of in informal dumpsites.

Mismanaged waste on land can leak into rivers and reach the ocean. One to two million tons of plastic enter the ocean each year, where the plastic persists as floating debris and forms garbage patches such as the Great Pacific Garbage Patch and South Pacific garbage patch. Garbage patches can be harmful to marine ecosystems. Many marine animals, notably sea turtles, confuse garbage for food, and marine birds are harmed when they eat fish that have consumed ocean plastics. Ingesting plastic debris can cause choking, starvation, and other impairments.

=== Sustainable waste management ===
Waste hierarchy, from most preferred to least preferred

Solid garbage stream treatment with the tumbler screening separation method

A widely used approach to sustainable waste treatment is a stepped-down management approach. It prioritizes the prevention of garbage, followed by preparing products for reuse, recycle of material, and recovery of energy or other valuables from garbage. The hierarchy approach can reduce the waste amount for treatment and helps to limit the environmental impact. This approach is used by various forms of governments and organizations. The waste management hierarchy:

1. Reduce – avoid creating waste by using less material and extending product life.
2. Reuse – use products again for their initial purpose or as another purpose.
3. Recycle – reprocesses and repurposes garbage material.
4. Recover – getting useful value from waste.
5. Dispose – discarding waste with little or no recoverable value or practical benefits.

=== Reduce ===
Many countries and jurisdictions have initiatives to reduce waste altogether, for example by banning or charging for the use of single-use plastic bags or containers.

==== Repair ====
Repair culture also varies globally. Traditional businesses such as cobblers or tailors repair shoes or clothes. In the West, researchers have noted an increase in "Repair Cafés" for small household goods or electronics items run by communities or municipalities.

=== Reuse ===
A garbage sorting plant in Poland

Thrift stores, charity shops, antique shops, and flea markets, "swap shops" or yard sales, or online platforms such as eBay, Vinted, or neighborhood networks keep still-useful products from landfills either by re-selling items or by circulating products for free.

==== Upcycling ====
A related approach is upcycling, in which discarded materials or products are transformed into new products of higher value, quality or functionality. Examples include furniture made from reclaimed wood and textile waste, as well as interior products and building components made from recovered materials.

==== Plastic sequestration ====
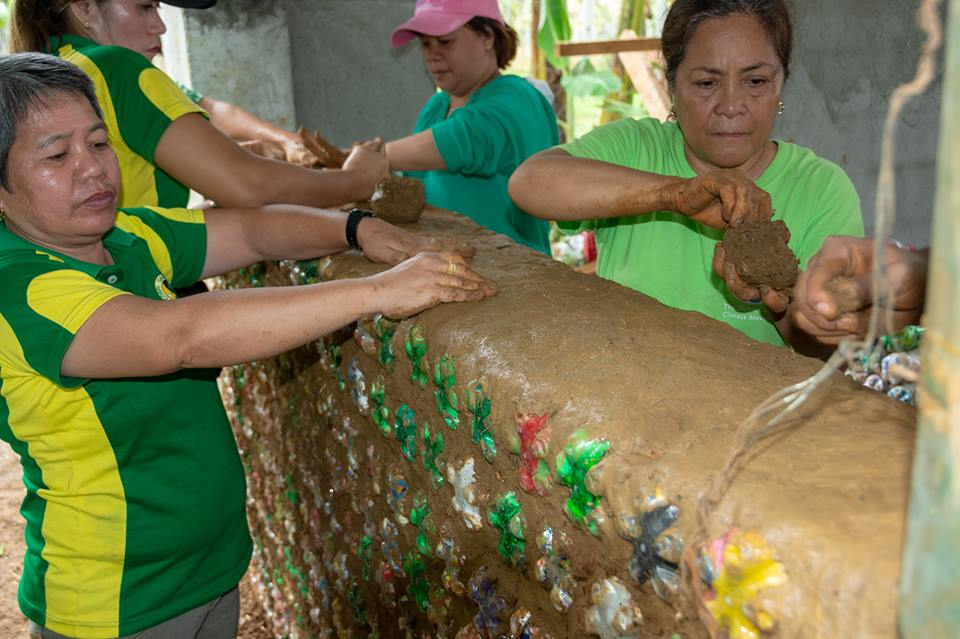
Women in the Philippines use cob and ecobricks to create a wall. Inside the cob, the plastic is indefinitely secured from degradation for the long term. Eventually, when the wall comes to its end, the ecobricks can be extricated and reused for another construction.

Building materials made of reused plastic are a method of plastic sequestration, that is, taking plastic out of the environment which would otherwise have gone to landfill. Developing countries have advanced these methods, and they are often those most affected by plastic dumped by developed countries or by western corporations with factories in the developing world. One method of making the 'bricks' involves stuffing plastic bottles with soft plastics, to make a material sometimes called ecobricks. Plastic materials may be packed together with traditional building materials such as cob or earth, to slow the rate of plastic degradation.

=== Recycle ===
Recycling, which makes up 15% of global waste management, is most common in North America and Europe. It keeps waste out of landfills and incinerators and returns recovered materials to manufacturers as inputs, although the EPA notes that no single management method fits every material or waste stream.

Study explores protein usage, from a food industry side-stream, to recover gold from e-waste.

Industrial waste and by-products can also be recovered and used as raw materials for new products, a process known as waste valorization. Examples include the use of fly ash, steel slag and mining residues in construction materials, as well as the development of new composite materials from industrial and agricultural waste. Such practices may involve industrial symbiosis, in which waste materials or by-products from one industrial process are used as resources by another.

Most municipal recycling programs rely on a basic loop of collecting, sorting, and reprocessing waste. Households and businesses separate recyclables—mainly paper, plastics, glass, and metals—from regular garbage for curbside pickup, drop-off centers, or deposit-refund programs. Haulers then take these materials to a materials recovery facility, where they are sorted and cleaned before being sold as raw materials to manufacturers to make new products. To improve efficiency, some municipal operators also use artificial intelligence and fill-level sensors in collection bins and trucks to optimize pickup routes and flag contaminated loads before they reach sorting plants. The United Nations Environment Programme had estimated that about 20 million people around the world earn money just by collecting and reselling garbage. Waste pickers are accountable for almost 60% of all plastic waste that was amassed globally. But many lack labor protections and health insurance, whilst having their work risk them to many different types of dangers such as cuts and infections.

Research has also investigated new building materials made from discarded textiles. Experimental applications include acoustic panels and thermal insulation manufactured from clothing waste, textile production residues and recycled synthetic fibers.

==== Composting ====
Organic forms of garbage such as banana peels, apple cores, eggshells, and coffee grounds are often treated through composting. Biologists and ecologists define composting as "the biological decomposition and stabilization of organic substrates ... to produce a final product that is stable, free of pathogens and plant seeds, and can be beneficially applied to land." Composting is a form of waste stabilization that takes an organic substance considered unwanted and transforms it into something that is useful and valuable. Composting makes up 6% of global waste treatment, capturing a small portion of the 38% of global solid waste derived from food.

=== Disposal ===
==== Open dumping ====
An open dump is a site where waste is discarded without adequate controls to protect people and the environment. Waste may be left exposed, and pollution can reach the air, soil, or water. Open dumping is not a sustainable waste management method of garbage disposal and it is seems not as required with advances, it remains widely active. A 2025 World Bank article reports that 33% of global waste is openly dumped and the share in low-income countries is much higher.

==== Landfill ====
The most common method of garbage disposal globally is landfilling (29%), in which garbage is buried underground or piled in a collection pit. A landfill is a designated site where waste is placed on or in the ground for final disposal. A sanitary landfill is an engineered type of landfill, designed and managed to reduce pollution – for example, with measures to contain waste and manage leachate. In many places, waste was historically dumped in open sites, sometimes covered over as the site filled. Modern sanitary landfills are engineered to contain waste and reduce pollution risks, using measures such as liners, covers, leachate management, and long-term monitoring.

The move from open dumping toward more controlled, engineered waste-disposal systems is an established goal in waste management, though progress is uneven worldwide. The landfill acts as a temporary holding area until technology allows for better recycling or treatment of the stored waste. There is a growing trend of Landfill Mining and Landfill Energy Recovery. Sustainable landfilling focuses on accelerating waste degradation to an inert state within a timeframe of less than 30 years, thereby reducing environmental impact.

Modern landfills can typically use garbage compactors to compress garbage into a smaller space. Well-designed modern sanitary landfills use liners and leachate-collection equipment to limit groundwater contamination, with collected leachate sent for treatment. Some sites collect decomposition gases to reduce greenhouse gas emissions while utilizing the collected gases for purposes such as fuel or generating electricity.

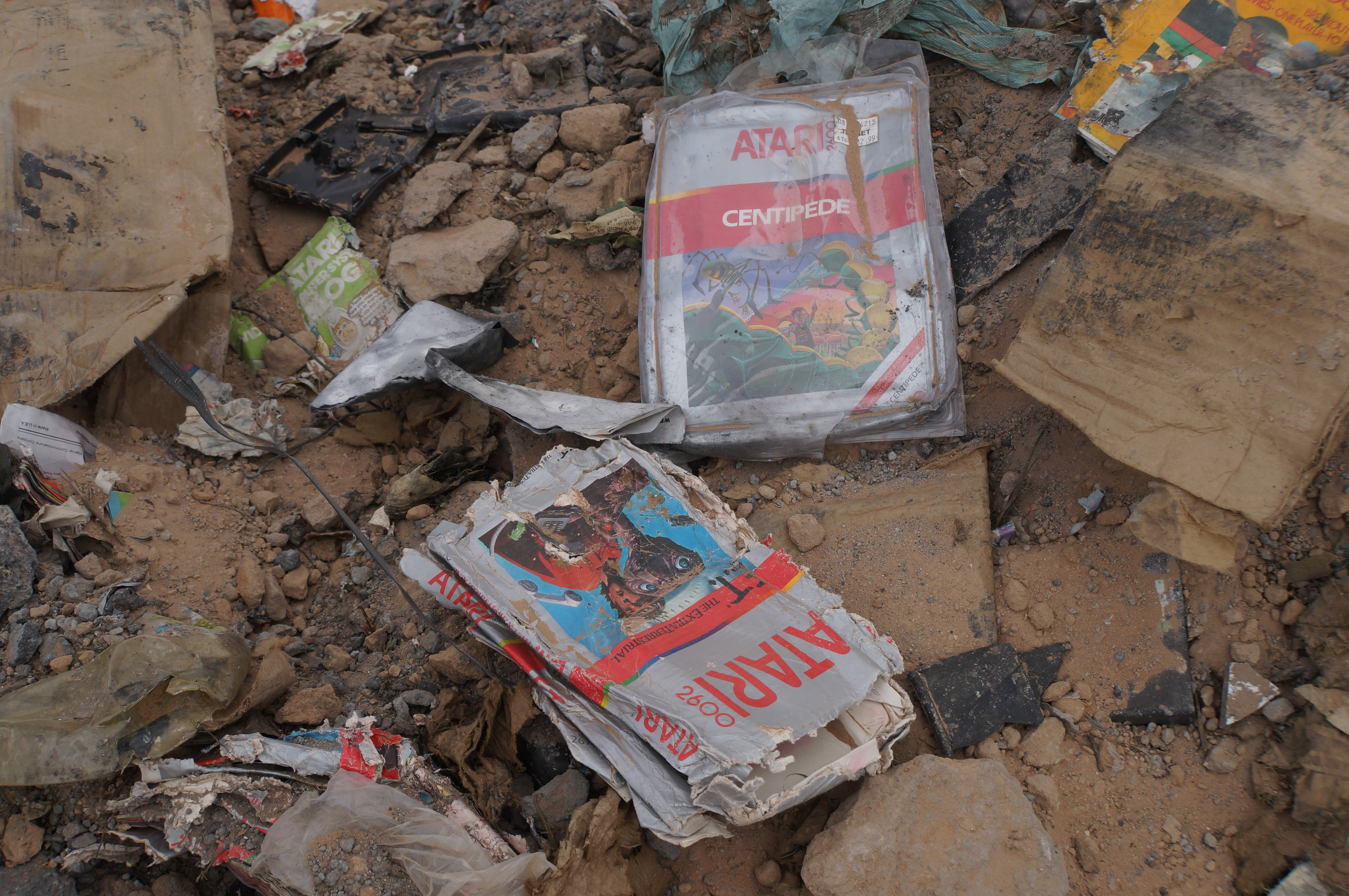
Video game packaging excavated from a landfill after 30 years

Garbage in sanitary landfills can be preserved for a long time without decomposing. During a 1965 excavation of a sanitary landfill in North Dakota, legible paper material was found dating back to the 1920s. In a Manhattan landfill example, paper makes up more than 40% of landfill volume. Like food, it often does not biodegrade; instead it undergoes a mummification process. American archaeologist and pioneering garbologist William L. Rathje discovered 25-year-old lettuce, 25-year-old guacamole, and 40-year-old hot dogs during excavations of American landfills. In 2013, archaeologists excavated a landfill in Alamogordo, New Mexico, to successfully uncover video games thrown away in the Atari video game burial 30 years prior. Excavating landfills is not without risks. In 2013, a discarded hard disk drive containing around £597 million of Bitcoin was believed to have been buried in a landfill in Newport, Wales, alongside hazardous waste like leachate and asbestos.

==== Incineration ====
Cross section of an American garbage furnace, 1906

The second most common form of disposal globally is incineration, used 20% of the time, which can involve the burning of garbage to reduce its volume and/or to produce power. Either way, this method produces smoke that can contain toxins. Incineration is the most common form of garbage disposal in East Asia and the Pacific region, but makes up one of the smallest shares in North America, Latin America, South Asia, and Africa.

== Methods of waste treatment ==
Municipal solid waste is commonly processed using a combination of physical, chemical, and biological treatment methods depending on the composition of the waste stream and local infrastructure.

=== Physical treatment ===
Physical treatment involves mechanical processes that alter the physical form, size, or density of solid waste without changing its chemical composition. Common techniques include manual or automated sorting, shredding, crushing, screening, and compaction. These processes are typically used at materials recovery facilities and transfer stations to separate recyclable materials—such as metals, plastics, paper, and glass—from mixed waste, reduce waste volume for transport, and prepare uniform feedstocks for downstream biological or thermal processing.

=== Chemical treatment ===
Chemical treatment uses chemical reactions to neutralize, stabilize, or break down hazardous or non-biodegradable components within the waste stream. Processes such as chemical oxidation, neutralization, precipitation, and stabilization are primarily applied to industrial residues, heavy metals, batteries, and landfill leachate. By converting toxic or reactive substances into less soluble or inert forms, chemical treatment reduces the risk of soil and groundwater contamination prior to final disposal.

=== Biological treatment ===
Biological treatment relies on microorganisms—such as bacteria and fungi—or invertebrates to decompose biodegradable organic matter, including food scraps and yard waste. The two primary biological methods used in municipal waste management are aerobic composting and anaerobic digestion. Composting decomposes organic waste in the presence of oxygen to produce a nutrient-rich soil amendment, whereas anaerobic digestion breaks down organic matter in oxygen-free reactors to generate biogas for energy recovery alongside a stabilized digestate.

== Regulation and legislation ==
Garbage inspection on a ship

The collection, transportation, treatment, and disposal of garbage are subject to national and regional waste management laws, which establish requirements for waste handling, environmental protection, and the operation of disposal facilities. In the European Union, the Waste Framework Directive establishes a hierarchy of waste management methods, giving priority to prevention, preparation for reuse, and recycling over other forms of recovery and disposal. In the United States, the Resource Conservation and Recovery Act provides a framework for regulating solid and hazardous garbage waste, including requirements governing waste generation, transportation, treatment, storage, and disposal.

In Japan, the Containers and Packaging Act (fully implemented in April 1997) divides responsibility for household packaging waste among consumers, municipalities, and businesses. Consumers separate packaging waste according to municipal rules, municipalities collect it separately, and specified businesses are responsible for recycling the collected materials.

In India, the Solid Waste Management Rules, 2026, notified by the Ministry of Environment, Forest and Climate Change in January 2026 and in force from 1 April 2026, replaced the Solid Waste Management Rules, 2016. They require waste to be segregated at source into four streams (wet, dry, sanitary and special care waste) and set out obligations for bulk waste generators. Several African countries have banned plastic carrier bags; Rwanda banned them in 2008, and Kenya implemented a total ban on single-use plastic bags on 29 August 2017.

In 2018, China's waste import ban prevented it from accepting plastic garbage with a contamination level of above 0.05%, which negatively impacted many countries. Most plastic garbage imports since have been to Malaysia, Thailand, and Vietnam. By 2026, 350 million tons of plastic garbage were produced annually, with 1.1–2.2 million tons, or 0.5%, ultimately ending up in the ocean.

In 2019, the EU passed the Single-Use Plastics Directive to reduce the negative impact of certain plastic products. This included a requirement for plastic bottle caps to be tethered to the vessel following a study of beach litter.

The international movement of waste is regulated through agreements including the Basel Convention, which controls the transboundary movement and disposal of hazardous wastes and certain other wastes, generally requiring prior informed consent from the countries concerned. The Convention's controls were expanded to cover additional categories of plastic waste from January 2021 and electrical and electronic waste from January 2025. Separately, international waste, including food waste originating from ships and aircraft arriving from foreign countries, may be subject to biosecurity restrictions intended to prevent the introduction of animal diseases and agricultural pests. In the United Kingdom, such material is classified as international catering waste and is subject to specific requirements for segregation, storage, transportation, and disposal as a Category 1 animal by-product.

In 2025, the United Nations Environment Programme assisted in the development of extended producer responsibility programs in seven different countries. It also launched an initiative in 15 different countries to shift away from single-use plastic packaging and help cities in Colombia, Jamaica and Panama to adopt reuse programs.

A research that was published in November 2025 had estimated that the United Kingdom contained at least 8,000 illegal waste sites which held 13 million tonnes of garbage, with the number of sites could being as high as 13,000. It had resulted in around 1.63 billion pounds in avoided landfill tax revenue. If the people responsible for the illegally dumped garbage cannot be traced, then the costs of removing it may go towards the taxpayers rather than the people responsible for it.

Garbage generated aboard ships is regulated internationally under Annex V of the International Convention for the Prevention of Pollution from Ships (MARPOL), which generally prohibits the discharge of garbage into the sea or international waters, subject to specified exceptions for certain categories of waste. The discharge of plastic garbage is prohibited, while the discharge of certain food wastes, cargo residues, and cleaning agents is permitted only under specified conditions, with stricter requirements applying in designated special areas. Annex V also establishes requirements for shipboard garbage management plans, record keeping, and the provision of adequate port reception facilities for the delivery of garbage ashore.

Laws regarding the burning of garbage vary. Some countries regulate or ban the burning of the natural waste coming from gardens, crops, and forests.

Legality of burning natural waste
Country	Source			Ref
Country	Garden	Crop	Forests	Ref
Austria			Only in extreme situations	
Belgium		Only in extreme situations		
France	Illegal	Limited	Limited	
Germany	Federally illegal, legal in some regions	Illegal	Limited	
Ireland	Illegal	Limited	—N/a	
Luxembourg	Illegal			
Philippines	Illegal			
Sweden	Limited	—N/a		
Switzerland	Limited			
UK	Limited	Illegal	—N/a	

== Art ==
Whale sculpture made from garbage at Reiman Gardens in Ames, Iowa, US, 2017

Some artists make art by assembling pieces of found trash, junk, or garbage. While the depiction of trash in art is ancient, the modern tradition of "junk art" has its roots in the idiom of assemblage, developed in the mid-1950s. It has been especially popular since the 1960s.

Junk art is often seen as a transgressive art form, expressing social or political dissent. Gillian Whitely argues that not all junk art is, however: for example, she judges Justin Gignac's NYC Garbage Boxes are a product of a "temporary cultural fascination" with trash and a "garbage aesthetic" rather than social commentary. These boxes are small, transparent, and sold individually, each containing carefully arranged pieces of garbage with "Garbage of New York City" and "100% authentic" printed on the front.

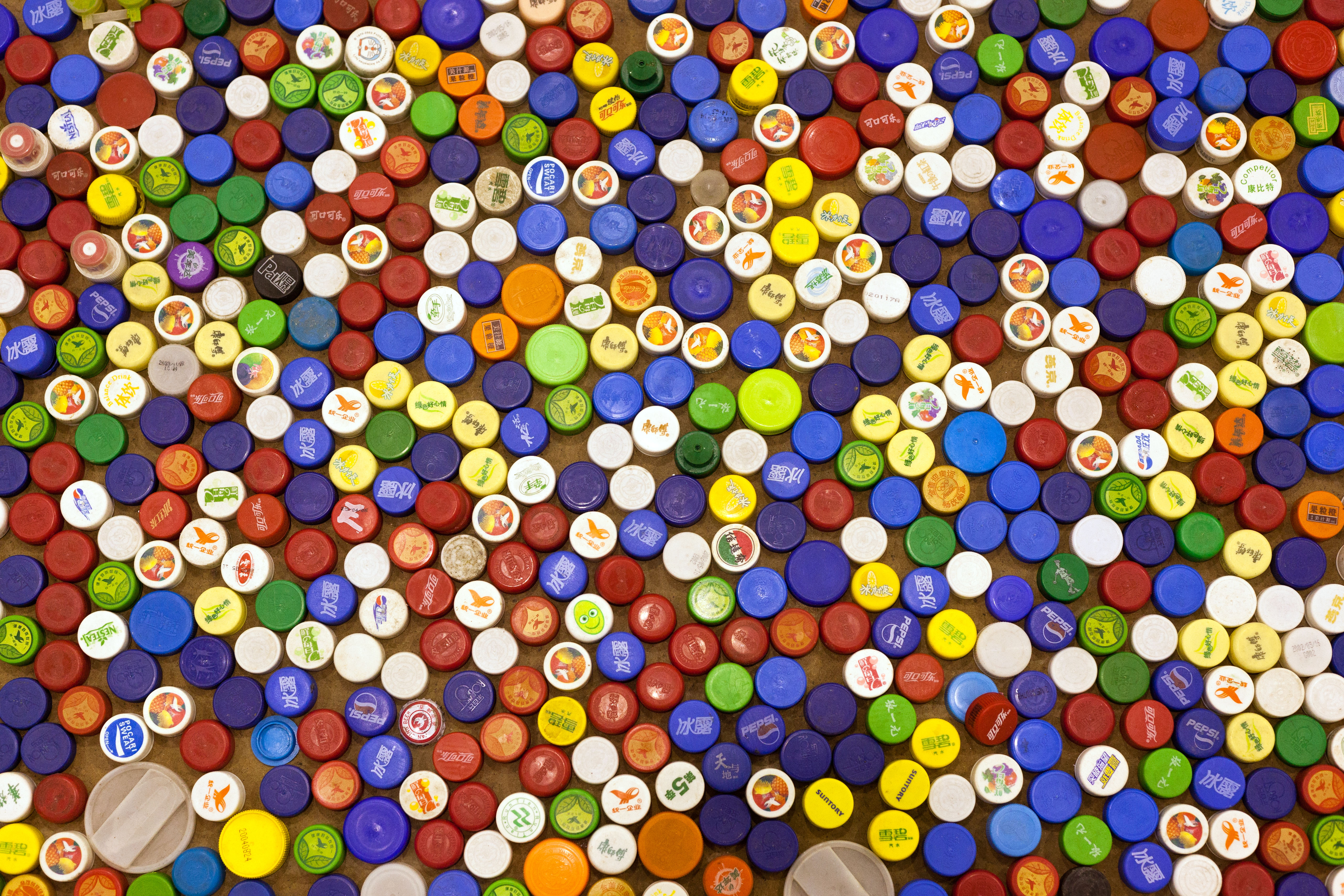
Bottle caps featured in the exhibit Waste Not by Song Dong, 2006

Recent examples of junk art include Anya Beaumont's works, large sculptures and small brooches, which she makes out of discarded household plastic. They are motivated by the depressing feeling she had at the realization of the amount of waste plastic she had in her house alone, and a desire to do something productive with it.

Another example is Finnish visual artist Terhi Heino, who creates sculptures, collages, and installations using discarded materials such as used tea bags, fish fins, and other organic waste. Her work explores themes of transience and the relationship between humans and the natural environment.

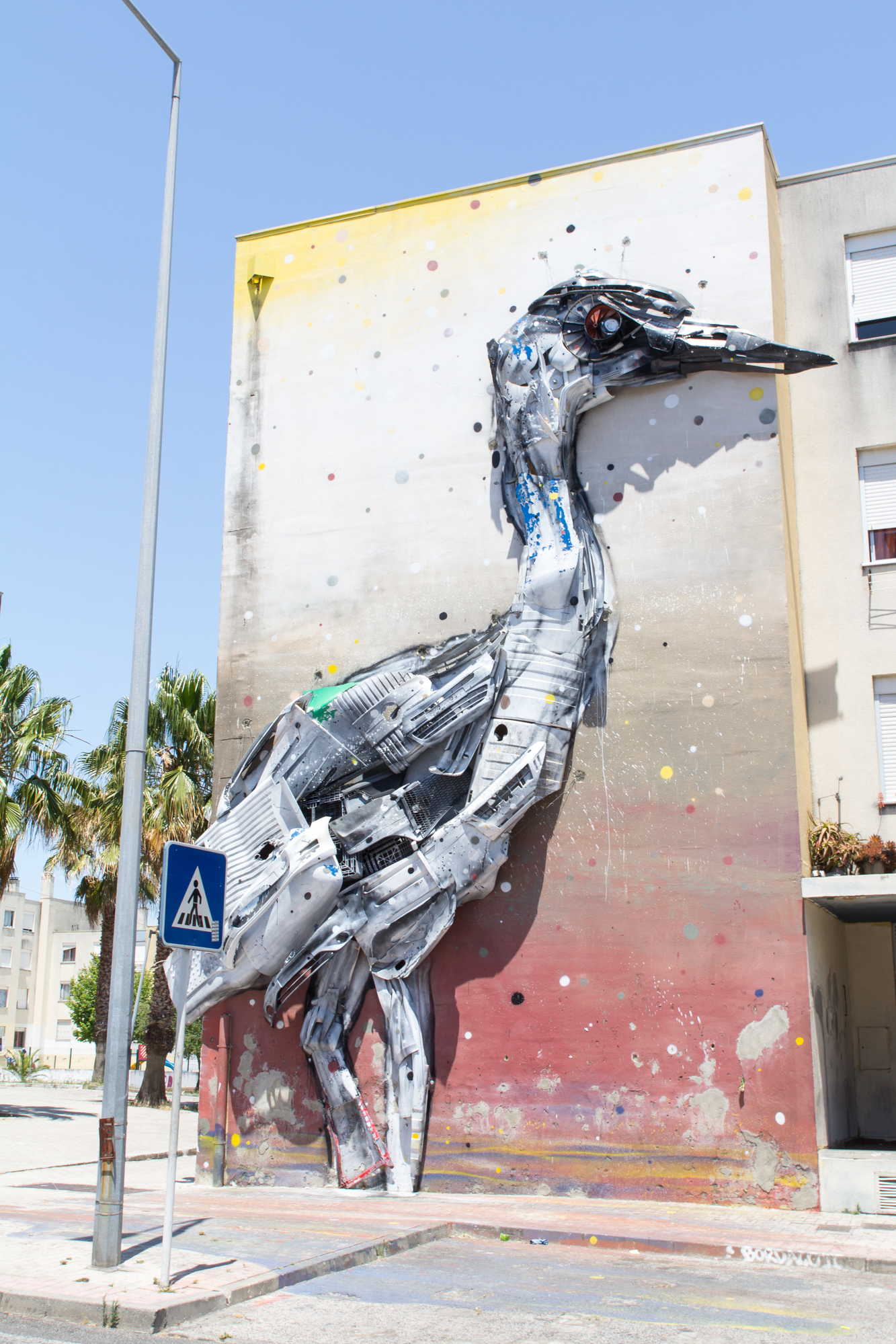
Trash sculpture of a bird by Bordalo II in Loures, Portugal

Portuguese street artist Bordalo II makes large installations and murals from recycled trash, with the intention of highlighting waste and over-consumption.

The waste disposal company for San Francisco, Recology, has an artist-in-residence program, established by Jo Hanson in 1990, that gives artists access to the public dump, studio space, and a stipend. Participating artists including Val Britton, Packard Jennings, and Jenny Odell have recycled dumped materials into sculptures and assemblages that Recology displays at their facility and in gallery shows.

== Study of garbage ==
Archaeologists often examine ancient garbage to learn about ancient societies. A number of attempts to systematically study modern garbage for analogous reasons have been made. For example, garbage can be used to determine if common beliefs about the food different people eat and the products they use are accurate, just as it can be used to learn about the foods ancient people ate and the objects they used and broke.

Garbage is also studied to learn about contemporary groups. Anthropologist Jason De León studied refuse left behind by migrants crossing the U.S./Mexico border in his 2015 ethnographic book The Land of Open Graves: Living and Dying on the Migrant Trail to better understand what objects were used and subsequently discarded on their trek. Large collections of refuse left together allowed De León and his team to infer where migrants formed temporary camps along the trail.

When organic materials decompose anaerobically, they produce methane. So, scientists examine landfills to predict amounts of methane, as it is a greenhouse gas. Predicting runoff can allow for the municipal government to assess problems and take action to reduce climate change.

In 2026, Minnesotan researchers analyzed more than 67,000 pounds of garbage collected from six waste facilities between 2025 and 2026. The research had found that organic materials were recorded for 24.7% of discarded waste, then paper with 19.7% and plastic with 18.6%. It also found some changes in the composition over time, which includes a decrease in newsprint with 4.1% in 2000 to just 0.21% in 2026.

== See also ==
- Dumpster – Type of mobile garbage bin
- Garbology – Study of modern refuse
- Landfills in the United States
- List of waste types
- Post-consumer waste – Trash or garbage discarded by the end-consumers of products
- Waste by country
