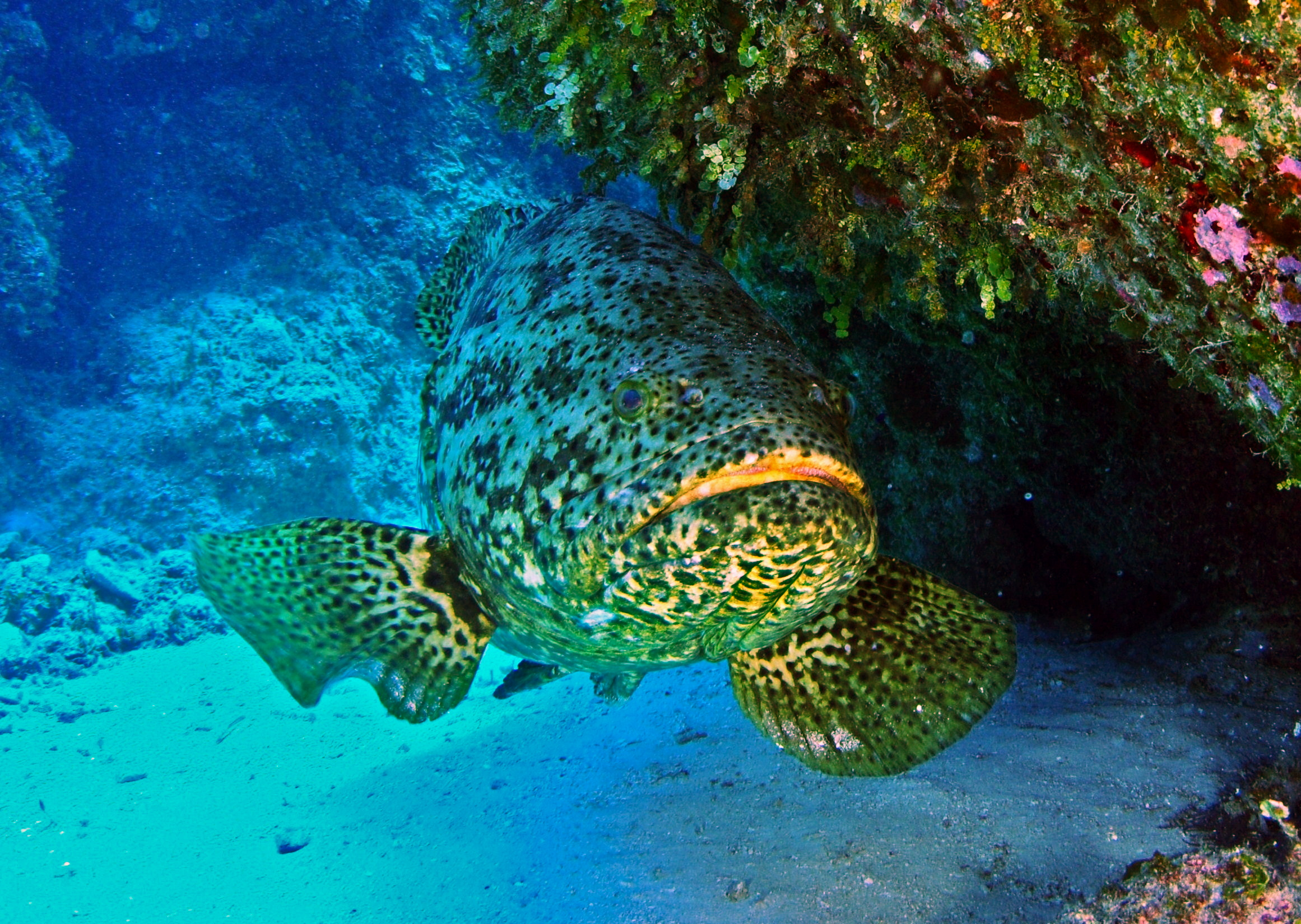

Conservation status
- Vulnerable (IUCN 3.1)

Scientific classification
- Kingdom: Animalia
- Phylum: Chordata
- Class: Actinopterygii
- Division: Teleostei
- Order: Perciformes
- Family: Epinephelidae
- Genus: Epinephelus
- Species: E. itajara

Binomial name
- Epinephelus itajara (Lichtenstein, 1822)

Synonyms
- Promicrops itajara (Lichtenstein, 1822); Serranus itajara Lichtenstein, 1822; Serranus mentzelii Valenciennes, 1828; Serranus galeus J.P. Müller & Troschel, 1848; Serranus guasa Poey, 1860; Promicrops esonue Ehrenbaum, 1915; Promicrops ditobo Roux & Collignon, 1954

= Atlantic goliath grouper =

Atlantic goliath grouper Temporal range: Late Miocene–present

Species of fish

The Atlantic goliath grouper, the jewfish or itajara (Epinephelus itajara), is a saltwater fish of the grouper family and one of the largest species of bony fish. The species can be found in the West Atlantic ranging from northeastern Florida, south throughout the Gulf of Mexico and the Caribbean Sea, and along South America to Brazil. In the East Pacific it ranges from Mexico to Peru. In the East Atlantic, the species ranges in West Africa from Senegal to Cabinda. The species has been observed at depths ranging from 1 to 100 meters (3 to 300 ft).

== Evolution ==
Complete fossil neurocrania of the Atlantic goliath grouper are known from the Late Miocene-aged Urumaco Formation of Venezuela.

== Etymology ==
The Atlantic goliath grouper is most commonly referred to as the "jewfish", and there are several theories as to the name's origin. A 1996 review of the term's history from its first recorded usage in 1697 concluded that the species' physical characteristics were frequently connected to "mainstay caricatures of anti-Semitic beliefs", whereas the interpretation that the fish was regarded as kosher food had little support. Alternate explanations include derivation from the Italian word "giupesce", which means "bottom fish", or mispronunciation of the name "jawfish". In 1927, the New York Aquarium changed the fish's name to Junefish after protests. In 2001, the American Fisheries Society changed the name to "goliath grouper" after complaints that the nickname was culturally insensitive.

== Description ==
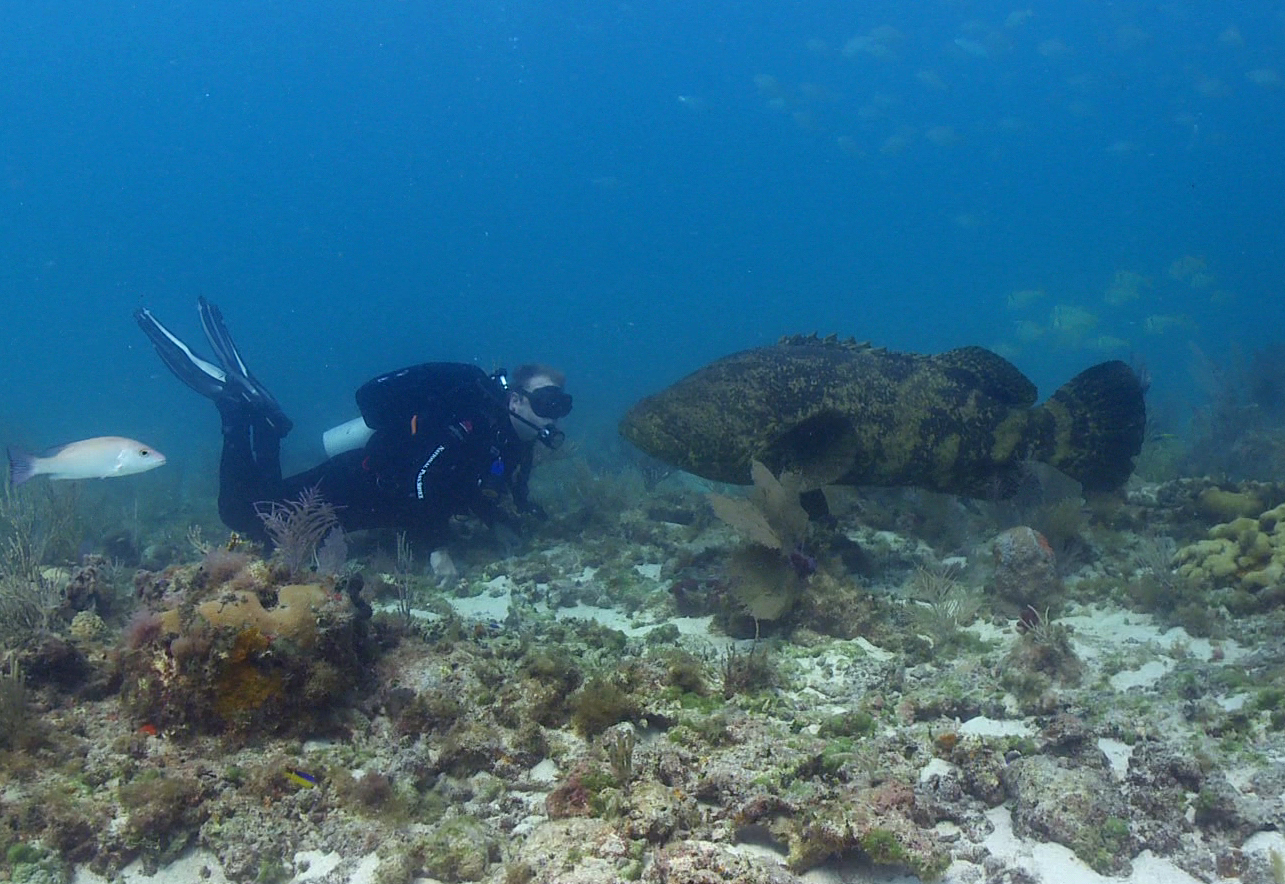
Atlantic goliath grouper

The Atlantic goliath grouper can grow to lengths of 2.5 meters (8 feet) and weigh up to 363 kilograms (800 pounds). The species ranges in coloration from brownish yellow to grey to greenish and has small black dots on the head, body and fins. Individuals less than 1 meter (3 feet) in length have three to four faint vertical bars present on their sides. The species has an elongate body with a broad, flat head and small eyes. The lower jaw has three to five rows of teeth with no front canines. The scales are ctenoid. The dorsal fins are continuous with the rays of the soft dorsal fin being longer than the spines of the first dorsal fin. The pectoral fins are rounded and notably larger than the pelvic fins. The caudal fin is also rounded. The species typically preys on slow moving fish (including stingrays, catfish, toadfish, burrfish and cowfish) and crustaceans, but very few, if any, snappers or other groupers. It may incidentally take octopus and young sea turtles.

== Habitat ==
Adult individuals are typically found in rocky reefs, wrecks, artificial reefs, and oil platforms. The species can also be found in coral reef habitats, but are much more abundant in rocky reef environments. Juveniles mainly inhabit mangrove environments, but can also be found in holes and under ledges of swift tidal creeks that drain mangroves. Mangroves serve as an essential nursery habitat for the Atlantic goliath grouper and provide specific suitable water conditions to nurture healthy, sustained goliath grouper populations. Juvenile goliath groupers may remain in mangrove nursery habitats for 5 to 6 years before leaving towards deeper offshore reef habitats at around 1 meter in length.

== Reproduction ==
The Atlantic goliath grouper has a longevity of 37 years and reaches first maturity after 6 years, which leads to an estimated generation length of 21.5 years. The species has been hypothesized to be protogynous hermaphrodites, but this has yet to be confirmed. Males become sexually mature at around 115 centimeters (45 in) in length, and at ages 4–6. Females mature at around 125 centimeters (49 in), and at ages 6–8. The species has relatively small spawning aggregations of less than 150 individuals with no evidence of spawning outside of these aggregations.

== Conservation ==
Atlantic goliath groupers are highly susceptible to rapid population decline due to overfishing and the exploitation of spawning aggregations. The species has a brief annual larval settlement period, making the species' abundance extremely vulnerable to outside factors such as poor weather conditions. High mercury concentrations in older males may lead to liver damage and/or death and reduce egg viability. The degradation of mangroves, which serve as an important nursery habitat for the species provide a major threat to juvenile survival. The species was previously classified as critically endangered in 2011 and is currently classified as vulnerable in 2021. A 2016 stock assessment model indicates that there has been an absolute population reduction of around 33% from 1950 to 2014. There has been a complete moratorium on the fishing of this species in continental U.S. waters since 1990 and in U.S. Caribbean waters since 1993.

In October 2021, Florida Fish and Wildlife proposed to allow the fishing of 200 juvenile goliath grouper per year including up to 50 from Everglades National Park. Recreational fishing of the species would be permitted in all state waters except those of Palm Beach County south through the Atlantic coast of the Keys. The proposal was approved in March 2022, with the Florida Fish and Wildlife Commission planning to issue 200 permits per year through a lottery system, which came into effect in the spring of 2023.

== In popular culture ==
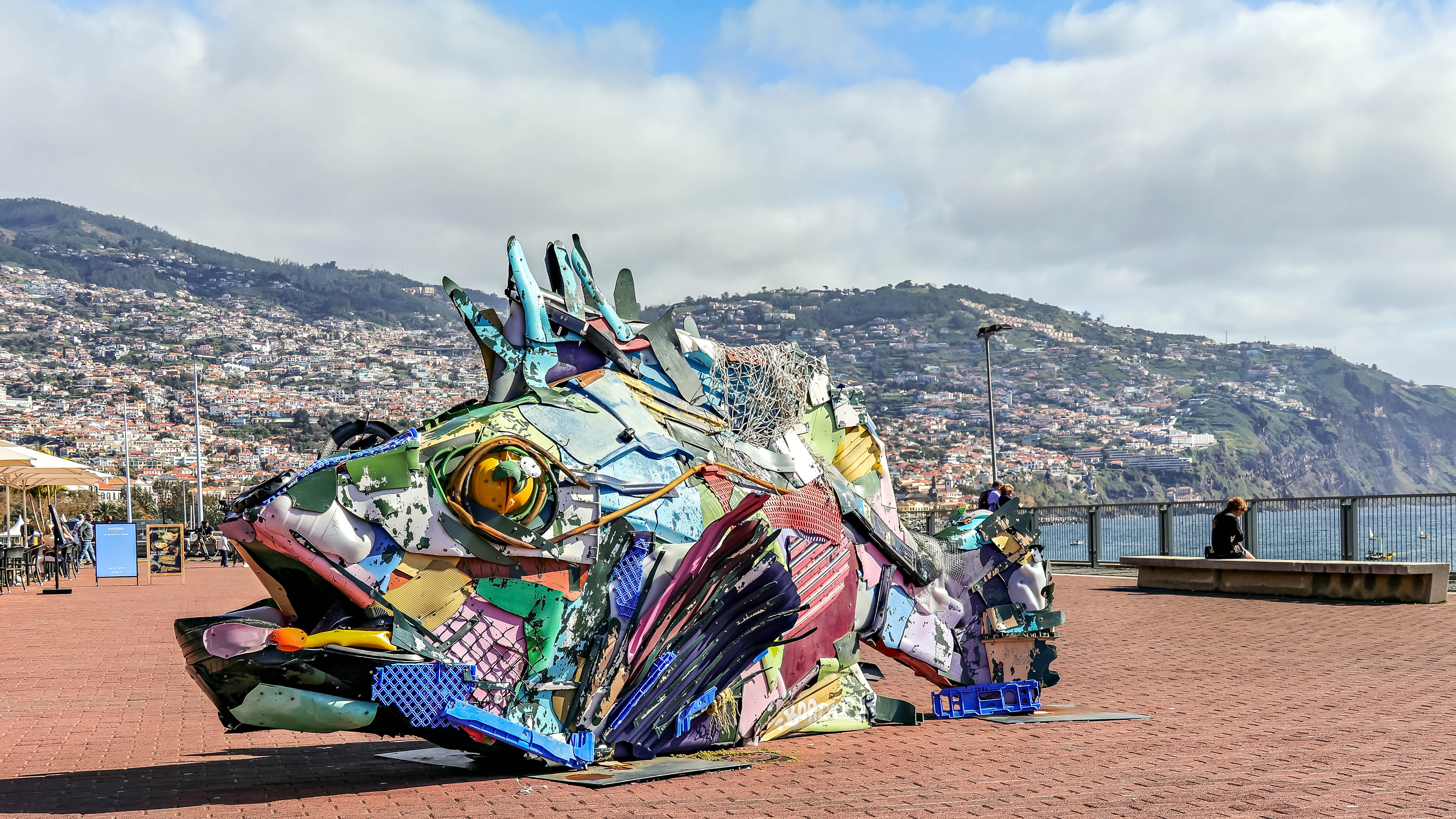
Plastic Mero, Funchal (2019)

Portuguese street artist Bordalo II creates installations made of trash to highlight over-consumption. His works consisting of animals are created to highlight the destruction of species by waste caused by humans. One of his public sculptures is the huge Plastic Mero, created from marine debris and installed in 2019 on the seafront in Funchal, Portugal.

Wilbur is a well known mature Goliath Grouper with a fishing hook stuck in its lip around Boynton Beach, Florida. Wilbur is friendly to divers, often letting them pet Wilbur. Wilbur's sex is undetermined. In 2026, toy company Youtooz and Lionfish Extermination Corp began sales of a plush model of Wilbur with the hook.
