= Waste in the United States =

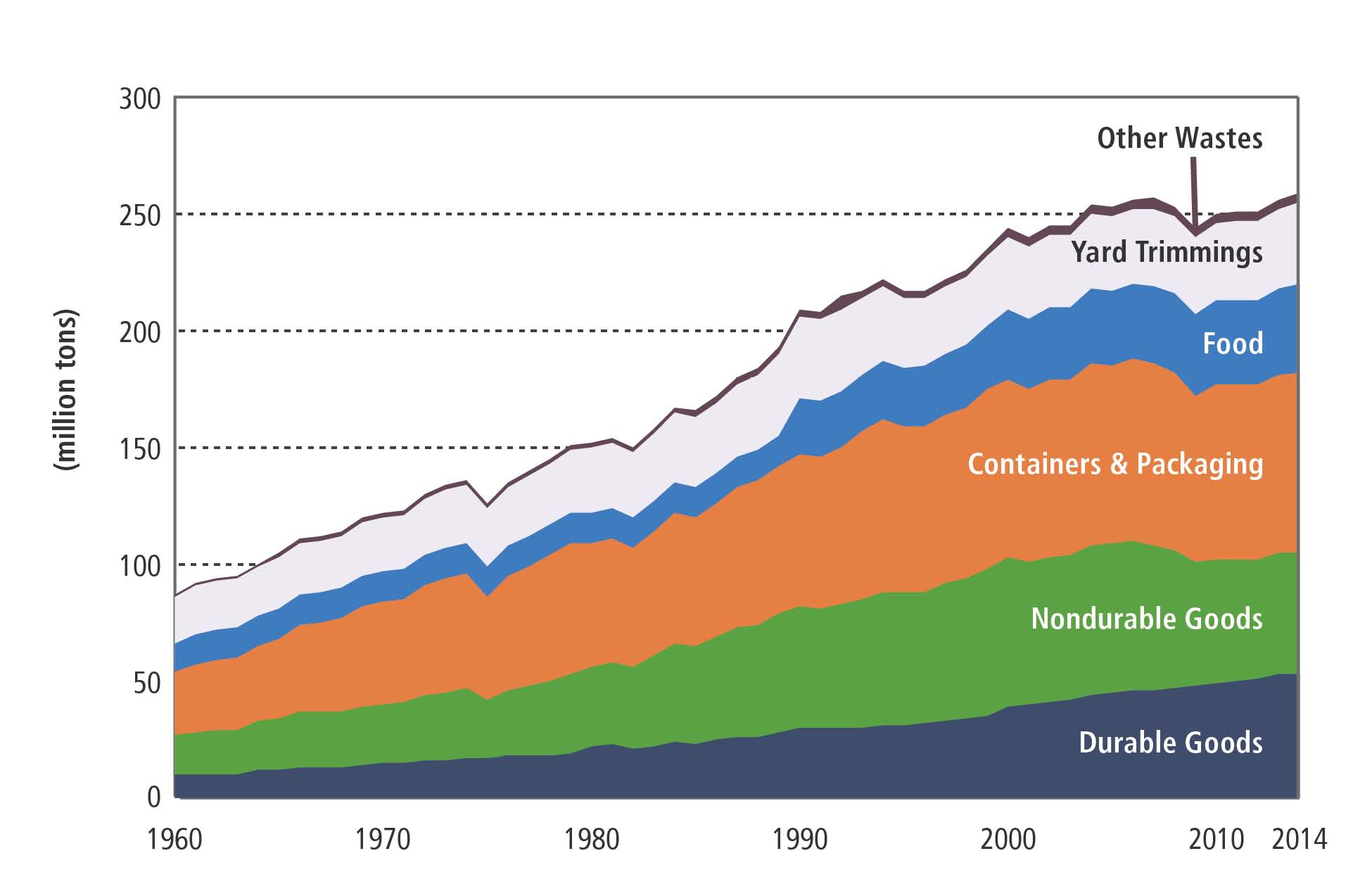
Categories of solid waste generated in the U.S., 1960 through 2014

As a nation, Americans generate more waste than any other nation in the world, officially with 4.4 pounds (2.0 kg) of municipal solid waste (MSW) per person per day, with another study estimating 7.1 pounds (3.2 kg) per capita per day. Fifty five percent of this waste is contributed as residential garbage, while the remaining forty five percent of waste in the U.S.'s 'waste stream' comes from manufacturing, retailing, and commercial trade in the U.S. economy. According to the American Society of Civil Engineers, Nevada produces the most waste at "[nearly] 8 pounds (3.6 kg) per person per day". Approximately 90% of all waste produced by Nevadans ends up in landfills. "Wasteful" states Michigan, New Mexico, Wisconsin and Oregon as well as Washington also dominated the list's 5-year period.

== Definitions ==
Waste may be defined differently in legislation and regulations of the federal government or individual states. Title 40 of the Code of Federal Regulations dealing with protection of the environment contains at least four different definitions of waste at sections 60.111b, 61.341, 191.12 and 704.83. Definitions may apply broadly to solid, liquid, and gaseous forms or may be specific to one or a subset identified by a threshold characteristic such as toxicity or radioactivity. Discarding, discharge, or disposal (as opposed to sales) is often a requirement for identification as waste, although stored or recycled material may be included within some definitions; and those definitions may reduce recycling options. Comparative quantification of waste may be difficult if the waste material is intentionally diluted in a handling or disposal process (such as diluting sanitary waste with clean water in the process of flushing a toilet.) Dilution may remove a material from a definition of waste by reducing concentrations below a defined toxicity or radioactivity threshold.

== Electronic waste ==
Electronic waste has become an ever-growing problem in the United States. Each year, over 3.2 million tons of electronic waste is put in US landfills. A large portion of this electronic waste is computers, monitors, and televisions. Over 100 million computers, monitors, and televisions are disposed of yearly in the U.S. Although there is an enormous amount of electronic waste in the United States, the Environmental Protection Agency found that in 2009 approximately only about 25% of all electronic waste is recycled in the United States. About 70% of metals that are found in the United States landfills come from electronic devices. The disposure of all this electronic waste has a detrimental effect on the environment, as well as the global economy.

=== Environmental effects ===
Electronic waste has become serious issue for the environmental stability in the United States. Over the years, the government has become increasingly more involved in this issue. As described in the U.S. Environmental Protection Agency Office of Resource Conservation and Recovery report of 2009, after the electronic products are purchased and used, they are separated into two groups. One group of electronics is collected for recycling, while the other is disposal. After this, the products that are disposal mainly are put into landfills, and the rest of electronics that were collected for recycling are either refurbished, reused, or used for material. Hans Tammemagi, the author of The Waste Crisis, talks about the detrimental effect the waste has on the environment. Nearly 20% of all waste in the United States is being incinerated, while the rest of it is being put into landfills. That leaves almost 80% of the waste consumed in the United States being placed into landfills. Out of this 80% of the waste, the majority of this waste is primarily electronic.

From fluorescent light bulbs to common household batteries, every piece of electronic waste that is found in landfills contains some kind of metal. One of the most commonly used metals in electronic waste is lead. Lead is found in most batteries, in the form of lead-acid, and it is also found in CRTs (cathode ray tube). These tubes are primarily used in television screens, as well as computer monitors. Since so many televisions, computer monitors, and batteries are place into landfills that means that most landfills have a large amount of lead in them, which is dangerous to the local environment. This is because the lead, like most hazardous materials that are in landfills, can be absorbed into the soil and ground water. Being exposed to a high level of lead can cause various health issues such as blood and brain disorders, comas, and in serious cases even death. Lead is not the only hazardous metal in U.S. landfills. For example, mercury, beryllium, and chromium are just some of the other metals that are in our landfills that are extremely hazardous to the environment, as well as to human health.

=== Trade ===
Recycling is not the only issue surrounding electronic waste's effects. The economy and trade of raw materials also plays a significant role in the economic issue of electronic waste. In the online journal Chemosphere, Jeffrey D. Weidenhamer and Michael L. Clement claim in their article, “Leaded Electronic Waste is a Possible Source Material for Lead-contaminated Jewelry” that the majority of electronic waste, which is produced in the United States, is exported to numerous Asian countries, primarily China, for material recovery. This is because the Chinese economy is increasing rapidly, and they have created a need for raw materials, which come from the electronic waste that the United States produces.

After being shipped overseas to China, the electronic waste is then stripped of parts in small Chinese workshops. Because so much of electronic waste has very hazardous material, especially dangerous metals, this creates a hazardous work environment for the people who work on stripping the electronics for spare parts. China does not have strict environmental regulations, so the electronic waste imported from America, which is not stripped for spare parts, ends up in large dumps in communal areas. This creates a very hazardous living environment for people who live near these dumps. There have been several different cases were people, primarily children, become very sick, or even die because of the exposure to all the hazardous material found in the waste dumps in China. A major reason that the United States trades the majority of their electronic waste to other countries to harvest raw materials is due to environmental issues. The book, Electronic Waste: EPA Needs to Better Control Harmful U. S. Exports through Stronger Enforcement and More Comprehensive Regulation, by John B. Stephenson, discusses the environmental and economic aspects of electronic waste in the United States. Throughout the last few years, the U. S. Government has recognized the environmental issue that landfills create, and has been creating bans on U.S. landfill. Although this may create more environmental stability in the United States, it has become a major environmental and health

== See also ==
- Hazardous waste in the United States
- Recycling in the United States
- San Francisco Mandatory Recycling and Composting Ordinance
- Waste by country
- International Waste#United States
