= Bordalo II =

Portuguese street artist

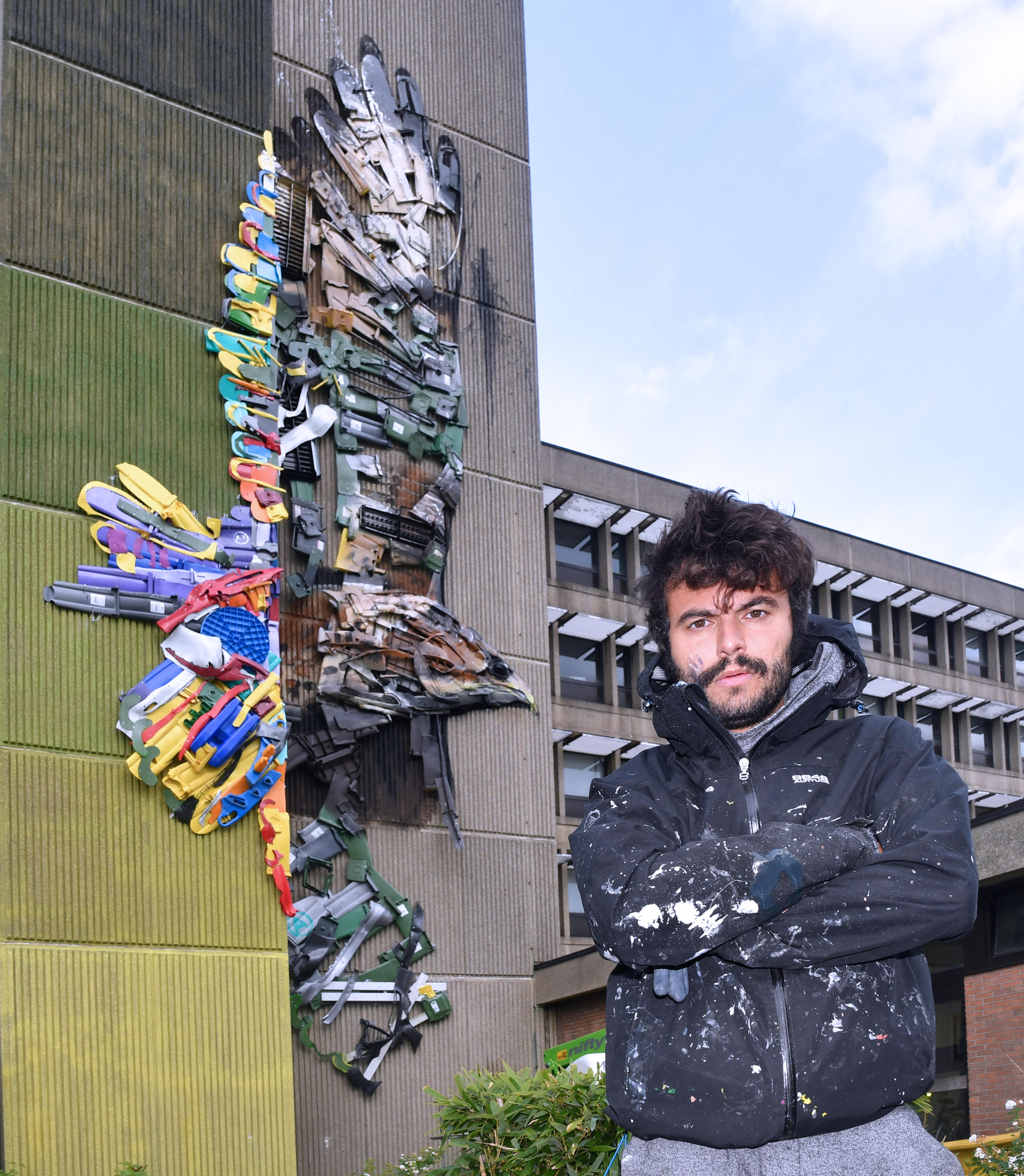
- Bordalo II in Vilvoorde, Belgium (2019)
- Born: Chris Roberts; 1987 (age 38–39); Lisbon, Portugal
- Education: University of Lisbon
- Style: Muralism
- Movement: Graffiti
- Relatives: Artur Real Bordalo
- Website: bordaloii.com

Tag

Artur Bordalo (born 1987), known professionally as Bordalo II (pronounced and sometimes written Bordalo Segundo), is a Portuguese street artist and self-described artivist. His work consists mainly of large installations and murals made from recycled trash, with the intention of highlighting waste and over-consumption in our world today.

== Early life and education ==
Artur Bordalo was born in Lisbon in 1987. As a youth, he spent many hours observing his grandfather, a painter called Artur Real Bordalo, (1925–2017). He started doing graffiti art with spray paint on walls when he was 11 years old.

He studied painting at the Faculty of Fine Arts at University of Lisbon in Lisbon for eight years, but never finished the course, instead experimenting with ceramics, sculpture, and other materials.

== Career ==
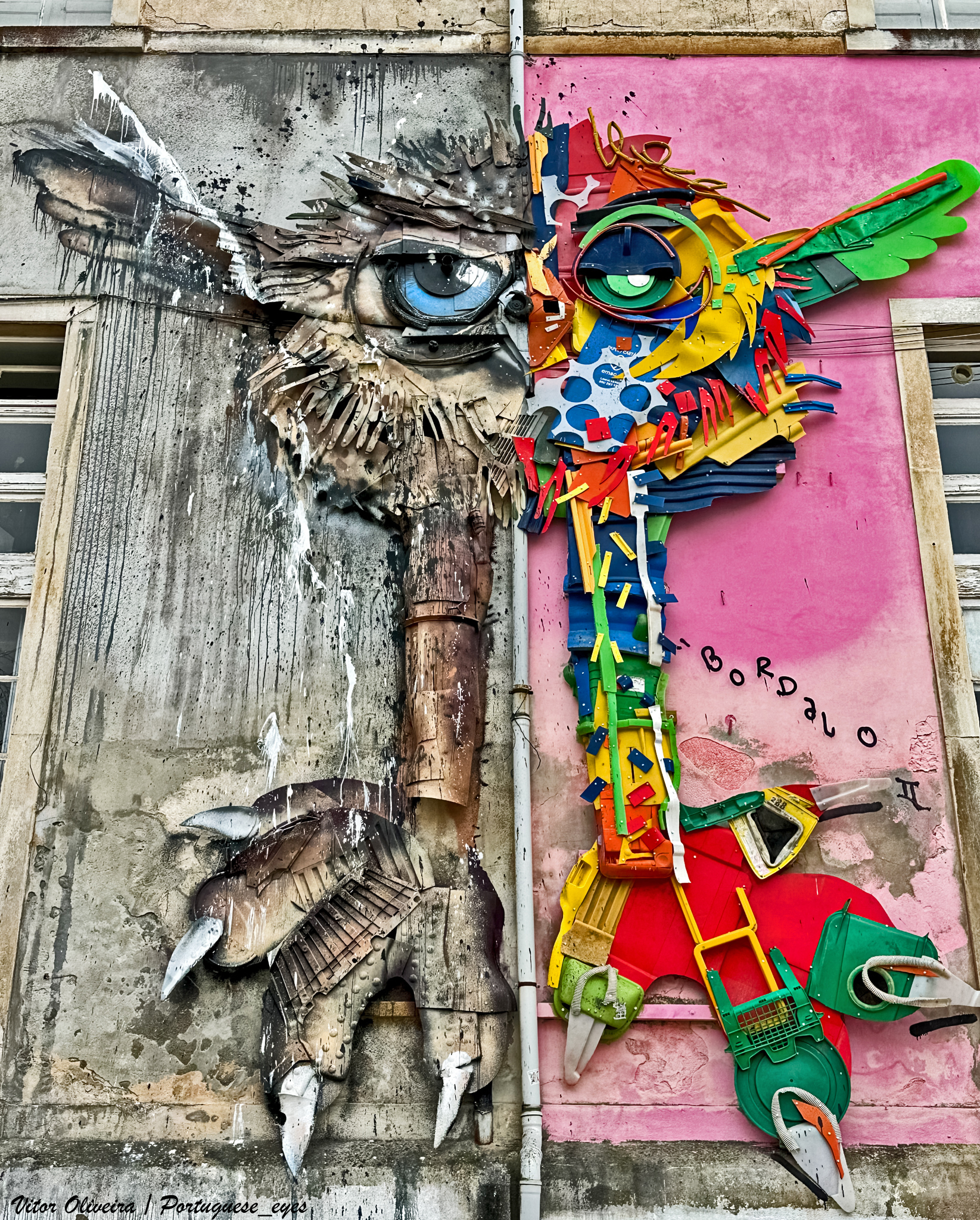
In Coimbra, Portugal

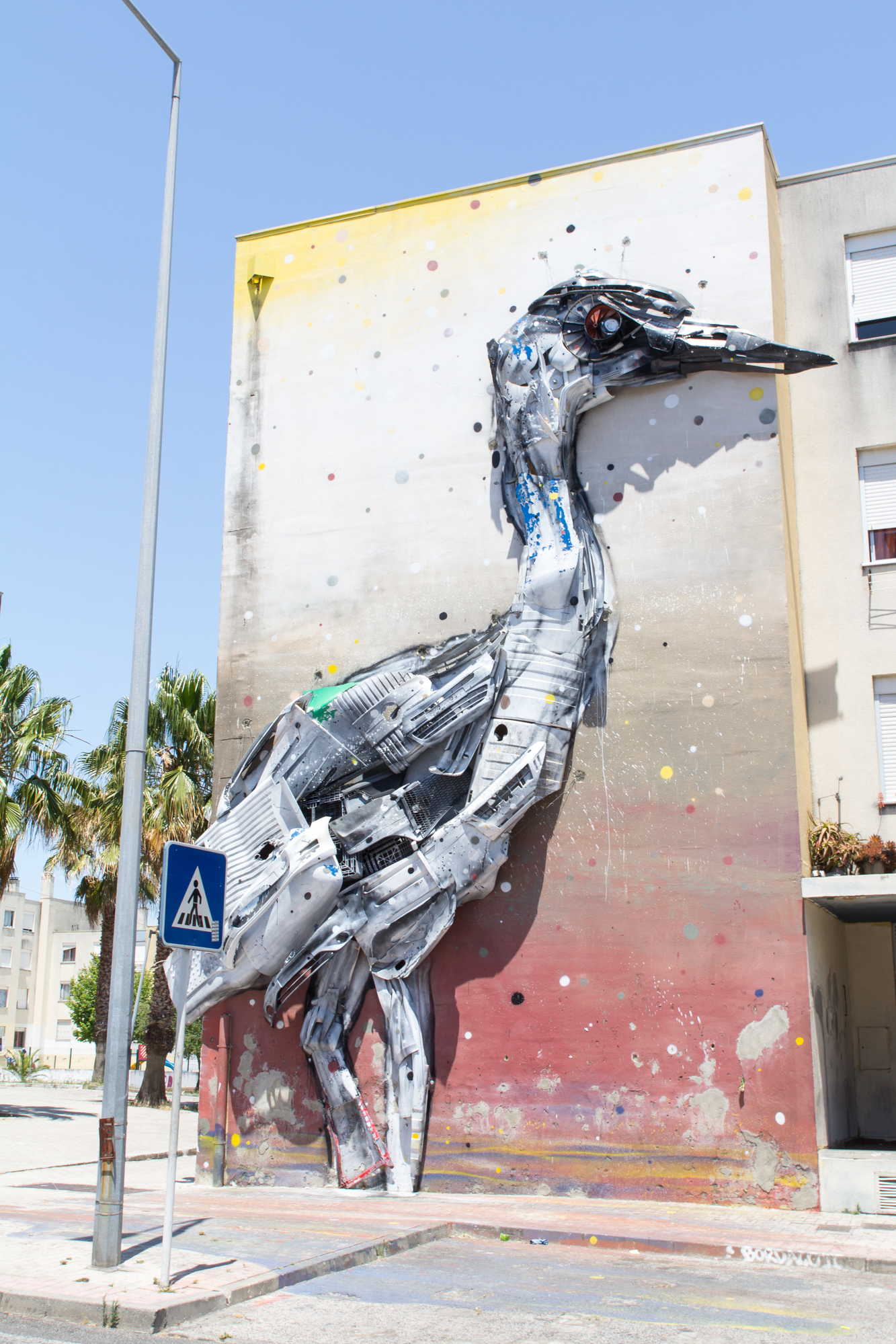
In Loures, Portugal

Bordalo chose the name "Bordalo II" in honour of his grandfather, which is pronounced and sometimes written as "Bordalo Segundo".

His work has been shown in solo and group exhibitions and mounted in streets across the world, including Singapore, the United States, French Polynesia, and Europe. In the 10 years between 2012 and 2022, he used over 60 (or 115, by another estimate) tons of waste materials to create around 200 sculptures of animals.

== Art practice and themes ==
Bordalo's work is focused on the themes of ecology, waste, and recycling, and makes use of garbage in his work as a method of critiquing over-consumption in the world. Using materials such as old tyres, pieces of wrecked cars, discarded appliances, plastic waste, and aluminium cans, he challenges materialism and consumerism in the modern world. He describes himself as an artivist.

== Projects, exhibitions and notable works ==
Bordalo's international project Big Trash Animals is a series of installations featuring huge images of animals created from rubbish. The project spanned many European cities, including Lisbon, Barcelona, Dresden, Hamburg, and Tallinn, with the first of these in Łódź in Poland, in August–September 2015. The sculpture in Łódź is the largest of the series, consisting of a large swallow on a building facade. Others in the series include a giant bear in Turin, Italy, and, in Portugal, a crab in Ericeira, and a fox and a frog in Lisbon. Big Trash Animals was also created in North America and Latin America. The idea of creating animals with trash is to highlight the destruction of species by waste caused by humans.

His next project was a large exhibition with his work scattered throughout the city of São Paulo in Brazil.

One of his public sculptures of animals is the huge Plastic Mero (representing an Atlantic goliath grouper), created from marine debris and installed in 2019 on the seafront in Funchal, Portugal. Another is a huge Iberian lynx in the Parque das Nações, a district of Lisbon, which he created for the World Conference of Ministers Responsible for Youth in 2019 and Youth Forum Lisboa+21.

In Railway Series, in Portugal, Bordalo used train tracks, painted in bright colours.

For a 2018 exhibition which travelled to Las Vegas, U.S., called Wild Wild Waste, there was a whale caught in fishing nets, a lion caged in a truck, and four penguins surrounded by rubbish.

His 2020 work, Lighted Jelly Fish, from the Big Trash Animals series, was exhibited at the Europa Building in Brussels during the semester of the Portuguese presidency of the EU, later becoming part of the European Parliament's Contemporary Art Collection.

In April 2021, two sculptures of seahorses were unveiled at the Gambelas campus of the University of Algarve in Faro, Portugal.

Magellanic Penguins was created for the Portuguese Pavilion in the Expo 2020 in Dubai, which ran from October 2021 until March 2022, and in July 2022 his work was exhibited in Singapore.

In August 2022, Bordalo created his first mural in the state of Texas, in the form of a 20-metre (64 ft) mountain lion on a wall of a building in downtown El Paso. An exhibition of his work titled EVILUTION was mounted in at Edu Hub Lisbon from October to December 2022.

In July 2023, shortly before a scheduled visit by Pope Francis, Bordalo broke into one the venues where he would be celebrating a mass, and laid out his latest creation - a huge carpet composed of giant 500-euro banknotes. His intention is to highlight how much has been spent on the event – an estimated 161 million euros – by the Portuguese Government (30 million euros), the Catholic Church, and Lisbon and Loures city councils.

== Other activities ==
Bordalo supports Portuguese refugee advocacy organisation Humans Before Borders, which helps to fund five medical NGOs working in refugee camps on the Greek islands of Lesbos and Samos.

== In film ==
A short documentary film entitled Bordalo II: A Life of Waste was released by the Irish Film Board in 2017.

== Gallery ==
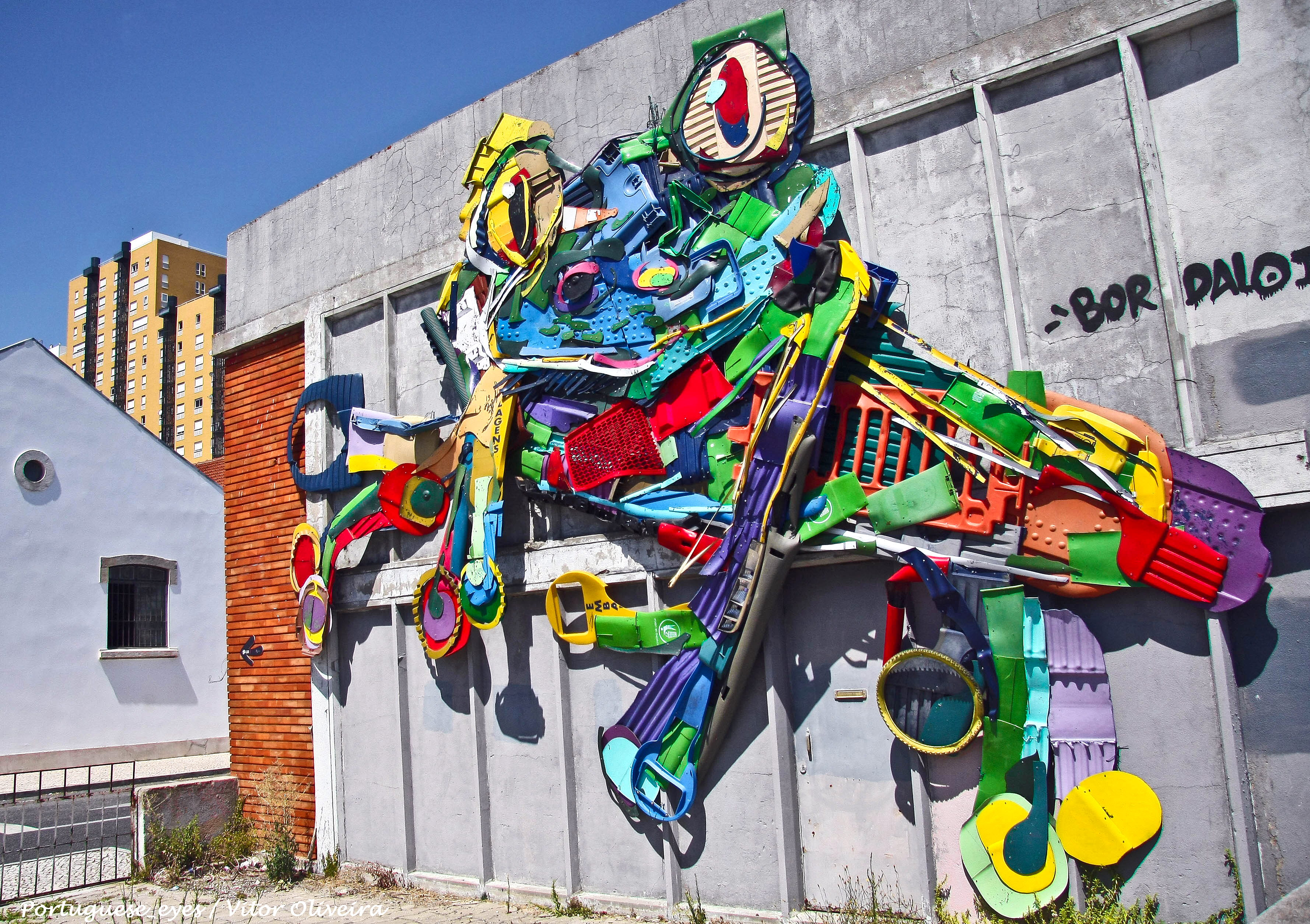
Frog, Lisbon (2018)

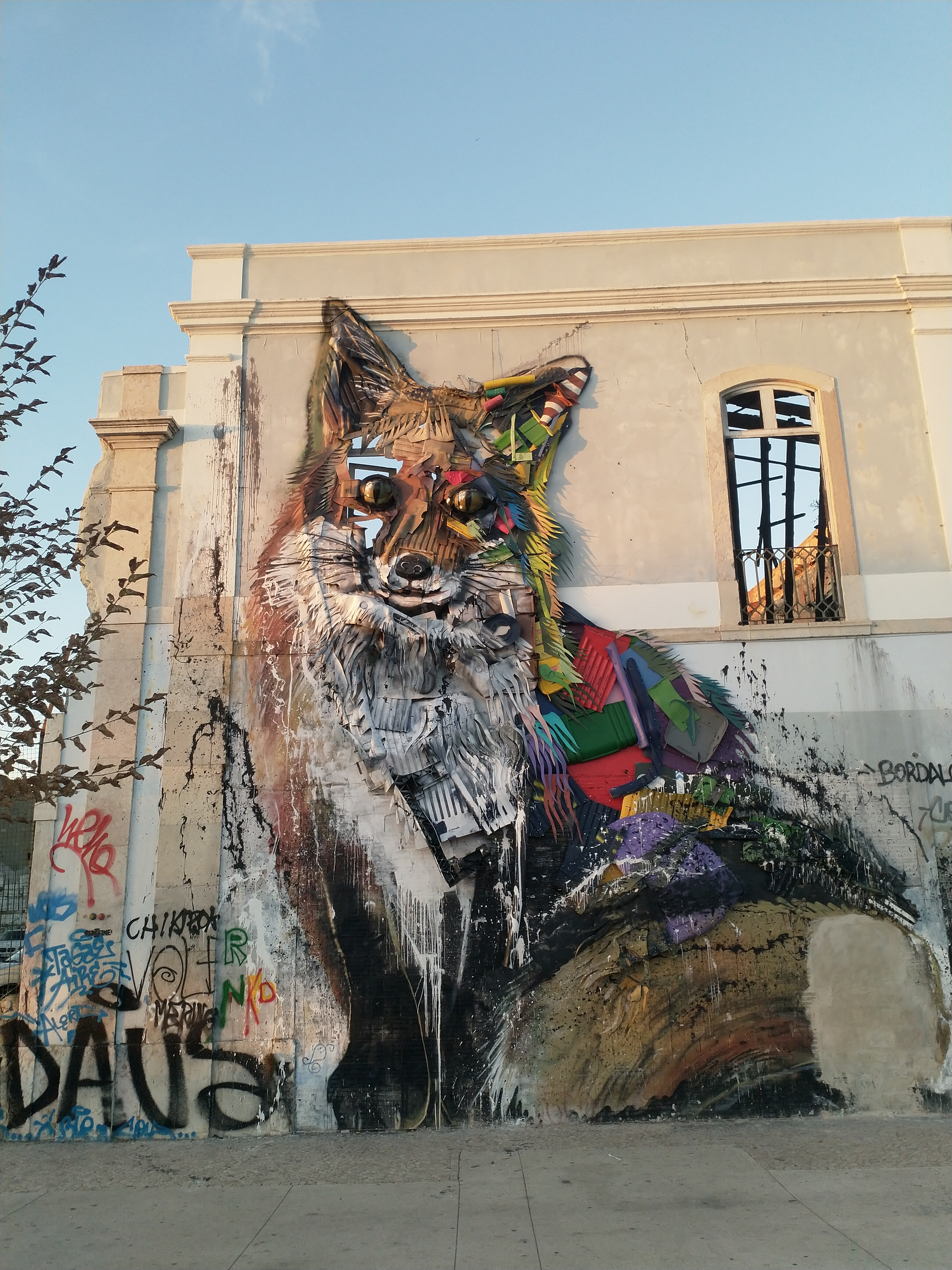
Fox (Lis), Lisbon (2018)

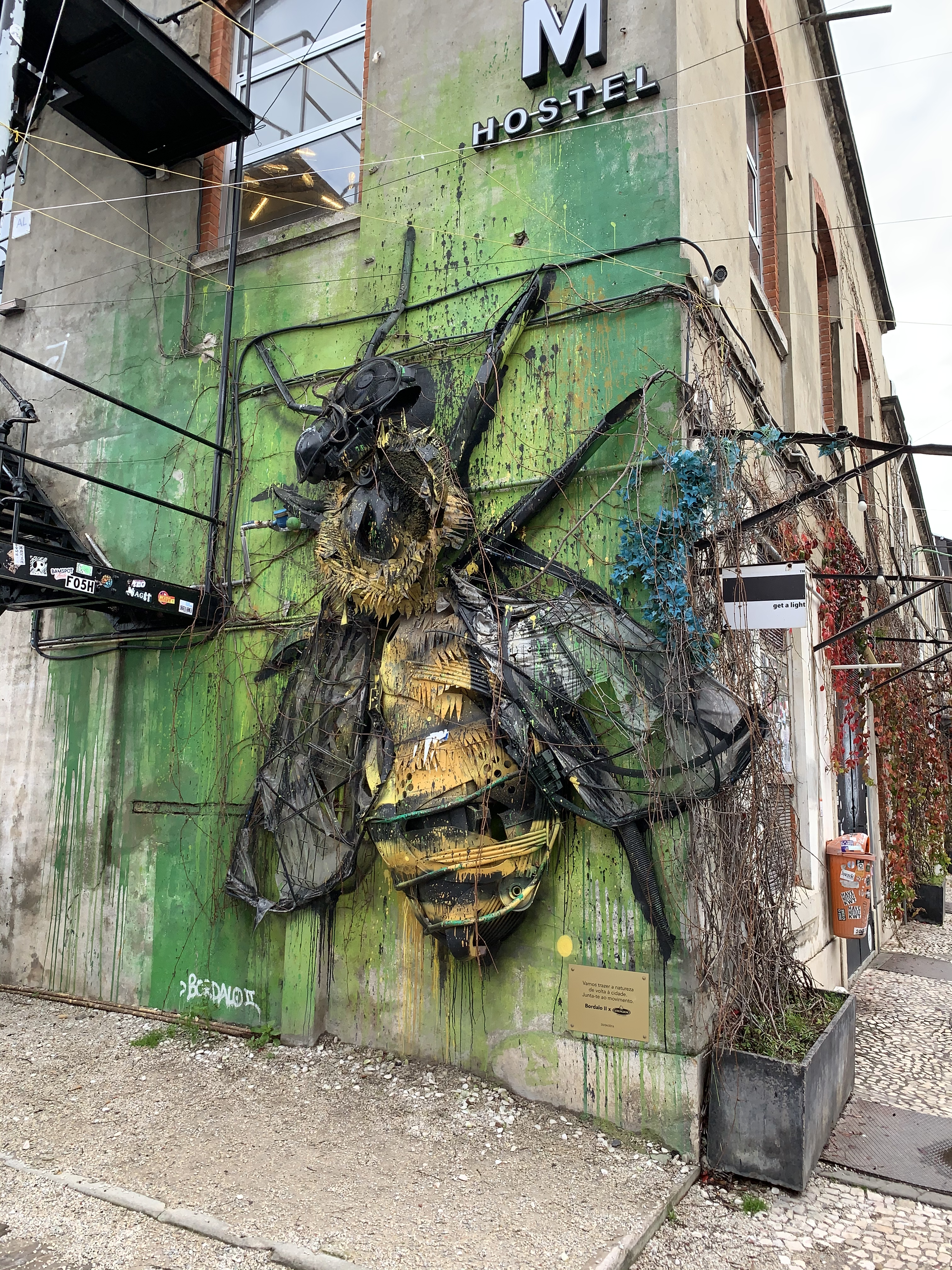
Bee, Lisbon (2019)

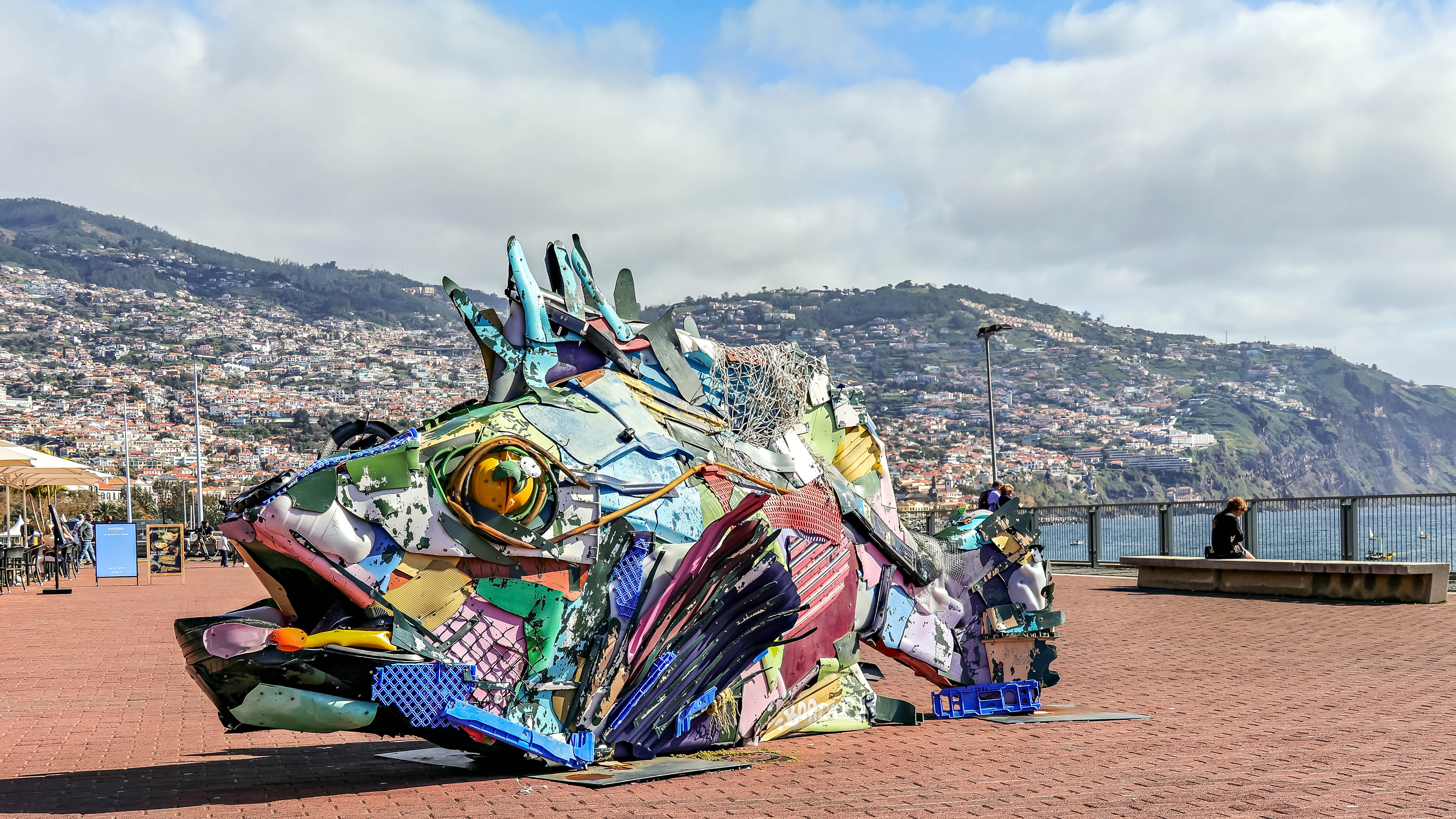
Plastic Mero (Atlantic goliath grouper), Funchal (2019)

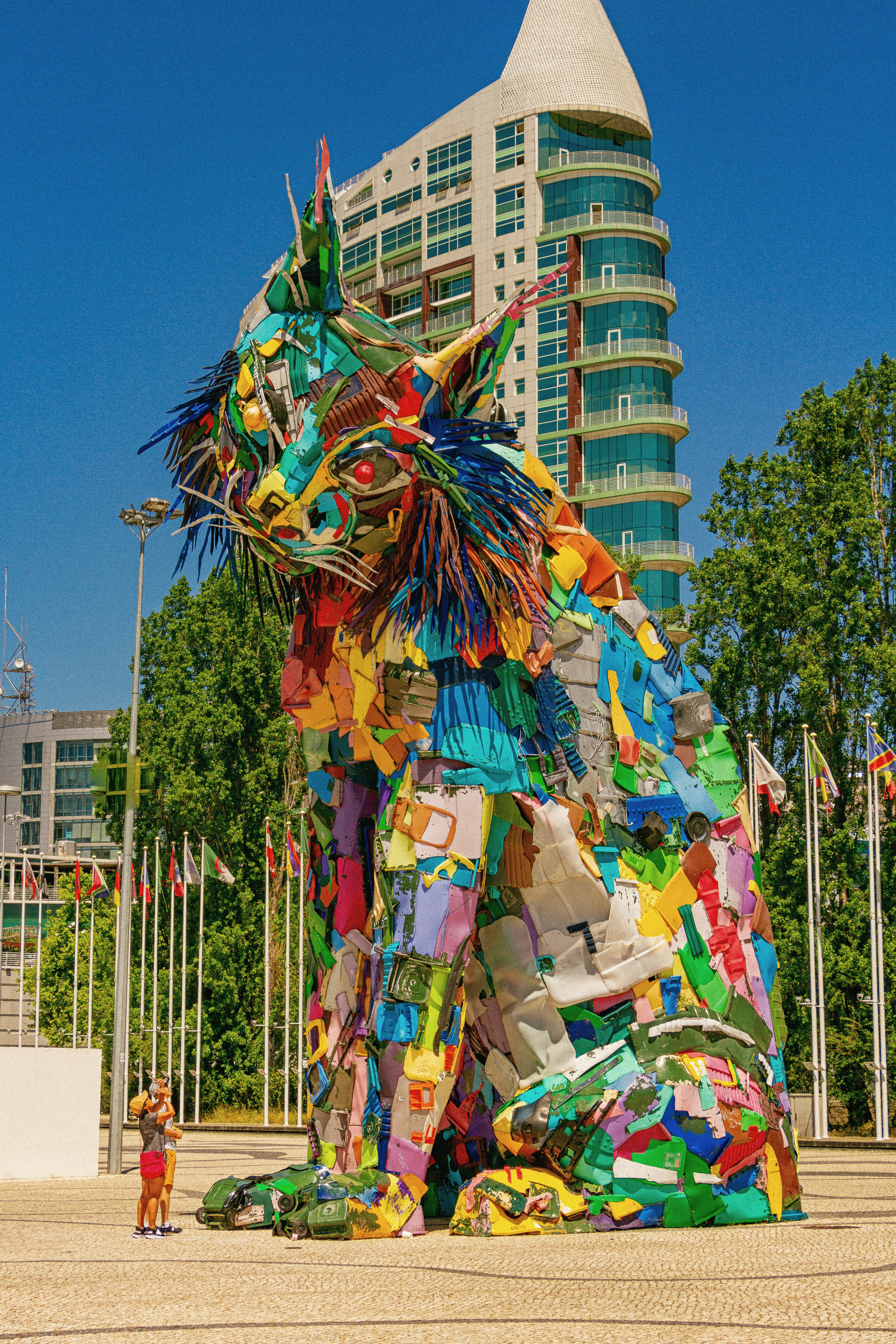
Lince Ibérico (Iberian lynx), Parque das Nações, Lisbon (2019)

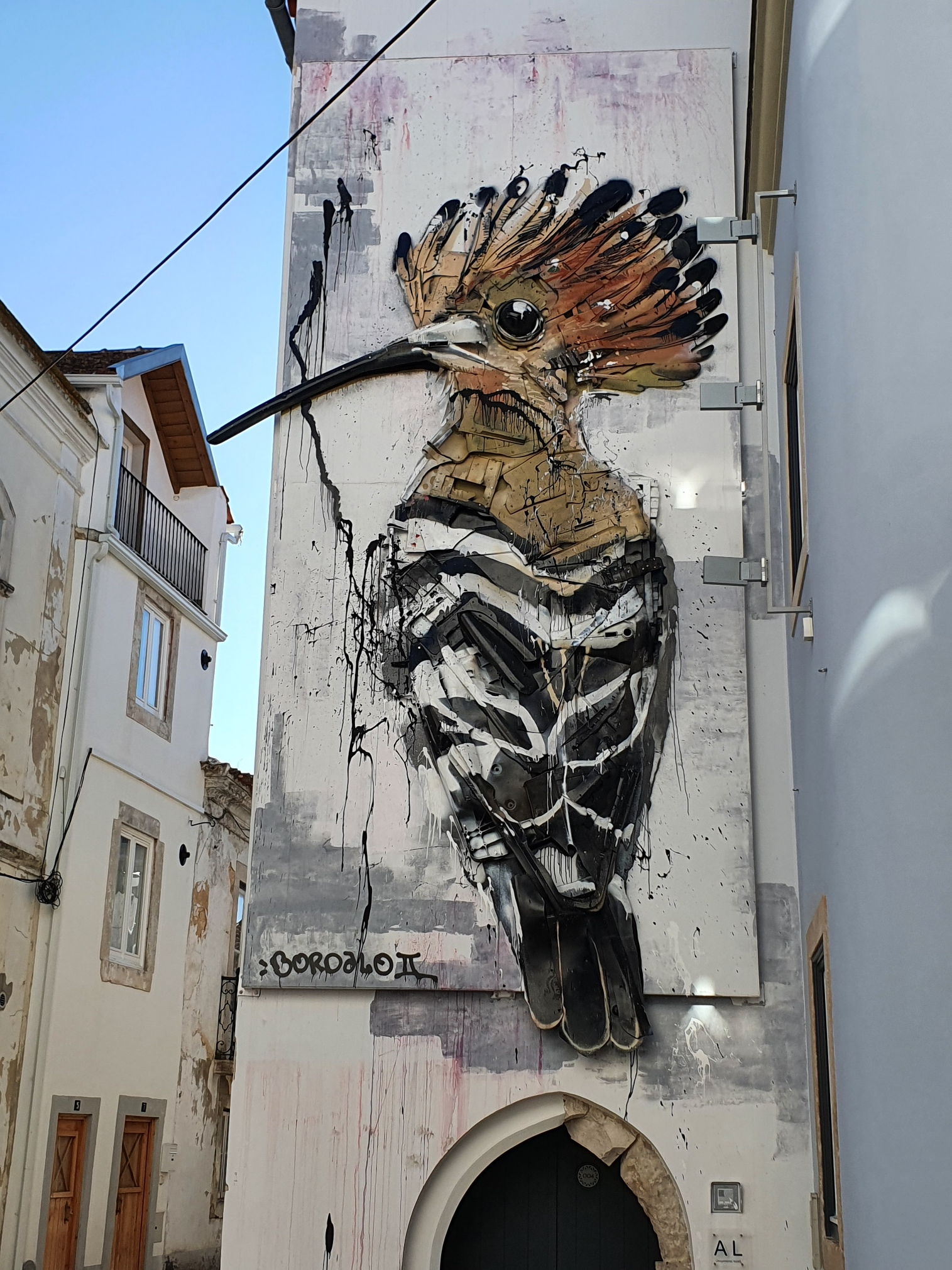
Hoopoe, Santarém, Portugal

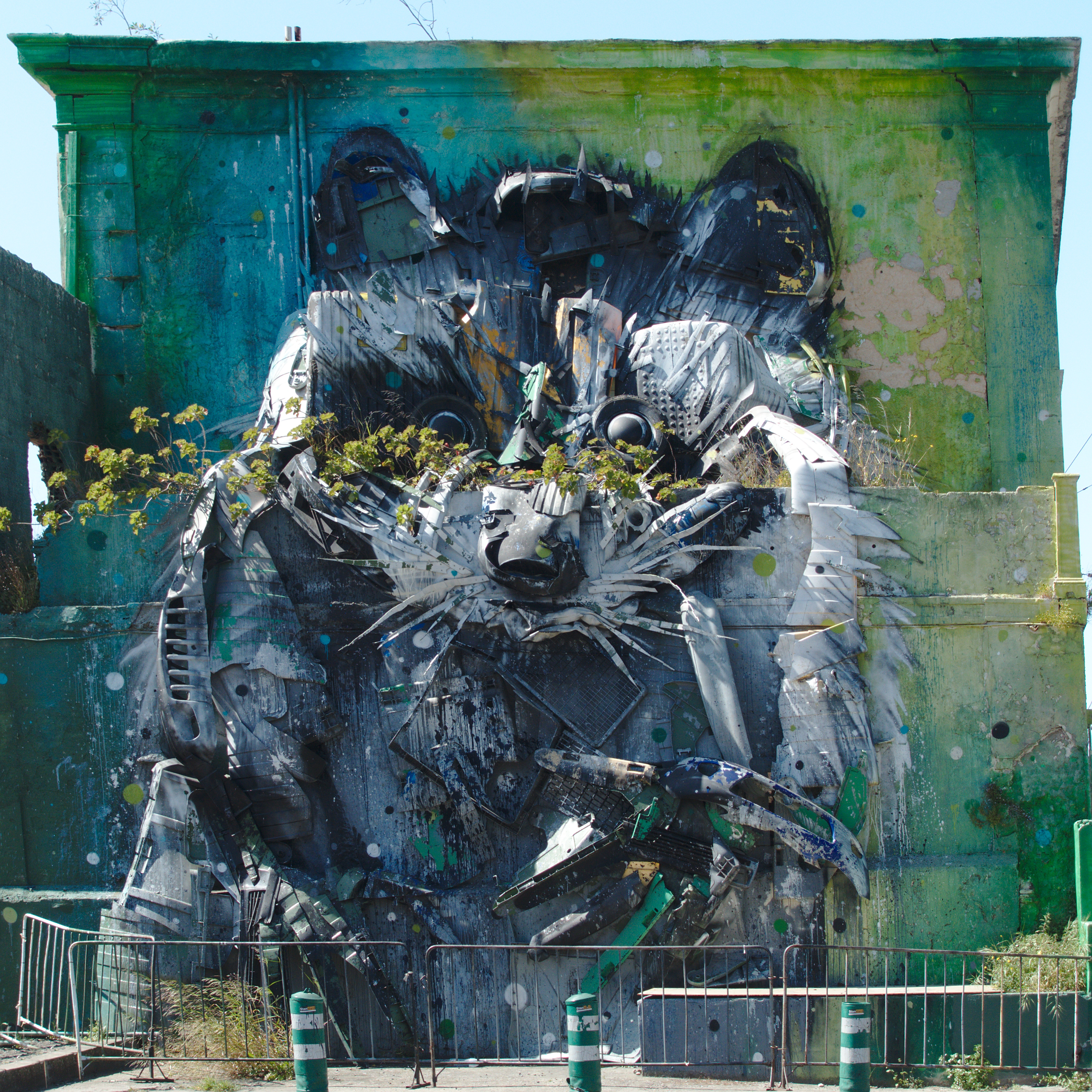
Raccoon, Lisbon
