= Tumbler screening technique =

Tumbler screening is a separation method that uses three-dimensional elliptical movement to separate very fine particles from larger ones.

Tumbler screening is a mechanical screening technique used in many fields that deal with raw materials and building materials for process and reuse. This technique can achieve 99% high efficiency with its circular movement. Machines with tumbler screening techniques are commonly used because of its unique rush design, high life time utility, and the flexible angular velocity the machines can achieve. However, this type of machine requires low feed flow rate, and the particle size for separation has to be controlled within a specific range. Furthermore, the performance of the process also depends on the intensity of the vibration. The water steam treatment is also an issue of this screening technique since this technique is applied worldwide.

Presently, the most effective and environment-friendly way for processing of the waste treatment is to classify the products. The products are usually split into four categories, including organic, inorganic, hazardous and recyclable. Nowadays, scientific research continues for further development of the method.

== Overview ==
The tumbler screening technique is a separation method that applies an elliptical movement in three dimensions, which helps to efficiently produce very fine materials. It can be considered an improvement to the vibration and linear screeners. Originally patented by Allgaier Werke GMBhH, the basic principle for the machines with tumbler screening technique is that the fine particles stay on the center of the screen desk while larger particles move towards to the edges. Higher-quality separation can be achieved by adding more desks and cleaning desks to the machine.

== Applications ==
The tumbler screening technique has many applications.

- It is utilized in the chemical and food industry in order to produce high-quality powder with sensitive properties; this technique can also provide a moderate treatment for the powder. This technique can also be used as a high-efficiency method of recycling high-quality raw materials.
- In food processing, simpler tumbler screening machines with one deck and screen sizes from 1 to 4 mm are used to remove foreign bodies and ensure the safety of the products.
- This technique is also applied in the metallurgy and ceramics industries.
- Finally, this technique is popular in the mining industry because of the long operating life of the tumbler screening machines.

== Advantages and disadvantages ==
=== Advantages ===
Tumbler screening is an improved technique to the other screening techniques in which product on the screen is moved from the centre by radial inclination while the tangential inclination leads to circular motion of the product.

- Tumbler screening provides 99% screening efficiency with gentle screening of delicate particles to prevent particle destruction. The complicated circular three dimensional screening action is adjustable to accommodate different material characteristics and is mainly independent of the material load, improving the separation process. This technique is usually performed after crushing/milling. It can be used for both dry and wet screening.
- Tumbler screening technique is a multi-deck elliptical action screening technique in which speed can be adjusted such that it has a faster travel rate at the feed and is slow at the discharge side, which can help increase in screen efficiency, so that products can be screened at high capacity to very fine separations.
- Tumbler screening has the advantage of having a container barrel with different outlet doors at each of the sorting levels. Thus, they can be used for sorting mixture of particles.
- A tumbler screening machine has the ability to run in a range of angular velocities. A range of product specialized mesh cleaning systems are accessible with rapid screen replacement systems optionally available.
- Tumbler screening machines have higher output per meter square of screening than the other vibratory screening machines. They require lower power consumption at different speeds at different levels and sorting at each level. It has a lower maintenance and is compact.

=== Disadvantages ===
- Tumbler screening has a disadvantage of blocking of the mesh in case of batch sieving if the particles are fed immediately inside the machine barrel. Hence, the feeding rate shouldn't be very high.
- Another disadvantage of tumbler screening technique is that it would be ineffective for higher particle sizes, ranging from six inches to +20 mesh.
- If a number of tumbler screening machines are operated in parallel in a building without building statics configured accordingly, dynamic residual forces can generate resonance in vibration which in worst case can eventually lead to connection elements to the screening machine shearing off. Particle–particle and machine boundary collisions in the tumbling motion of the rotating structure will dissipate kinetic energy due to normal and frictional contact losses.

== Characteristics ==
The screening process performance can be affected heavily by many factors, such as intensity of vibration, size fraction of the feed and feed rate. The process performance can be assessed by screening efficiency. It also refers to product yield. Screening efficiency is defined as the comparison of the undersized materials brought on the screening and discharged oversized product in contrast to the original amount of undersized materials in the feed stream. Tumbler screening technique allows separation efficiency to be as high as 99% due to the circular screening assembly's three-dimensional oscillations,. which will increase the effective screening area four times greater than normal vibrating screen.

Enormous studies have been conducted in the screening process kinetics. that screening process performance can be described as an exponential function of the process characteristics, which include feed rate, screening area, screen length, critical size fraction in feed. The sections below will give a brief introduction of these process characteristics and how they affect the screening.

The intensity of the vibration

The intensity of the vibration refers to the amplitude and the frequency of the vibration. It can affect the screening performance in many aspects. Amplitude is defined as the distance travelled by the screen in one circle. In the Tumbler Screening case, the screening is moving in three dimensions. The movement of the particles is determined by the vibration. Inappropriate vibration speed will lead to segregation, resulting in uneven distribution of the particles on the screen. Small particles will be over oversized particles and not being sieved. This will decrease the screening efficiency significantly.

Another reason why vibration intensity is important is that it will affect the contacts number of particles with screening. If the vibrating speed is too fast, the particle will go forward along the screen, reducing the possibility that the particles will pass through. But a high number of contact attempts will increase the screening effect as the residual time of the particles will be reduced. When the screen is moving too slow, it will cause fluctuation, which will decrease the efficiency. The common speed range is 180 to 280 min-1, and the common amplitude applied to the screener is 60 to 80 mm horizontally and 5 to 40 mm vertically.

Feed rate

Feed rate affects the screening performance of the tumbler screener as well. The amount of material presented to a screen for processing is called feed rate. It is often related to the amplitude and frequency of the vibration. When feeding to a screener in a high rate, the capacity of the screening will be pushed to a limit very fast, causing stratification. In this case, the intensity of the vibration needs to be increased to process more materials in a certain period of time. However, when feeding in a low feed rate, the efficiency of the screener will be at low state as well. The particles will stay in a loose state, which will decrease the effectiveness.

Material input to a tumbler screening technique should be constant and uniform throughout the running. Otherwise, the particles will not be evenly distributed on the screen and it may cause fluctuation. And it will lead to a poor performance of the tumbler screening. Feed rate should be more constant and steady when dealing with finer particles. The common feed rate range of a tumbler screening machine is 1 kg/h to 50 to/h.

Particle size distribution

Particle size is the most important parameter among others. It affects the screening technique directly. For a screening system, the particle size can be summarized as oversize particles, which is particles larger than the screen opening; undersized particles, also called fine particles, which is smaller than the screen opening. The undersized particles will be produced as product streams in screening operation.

Another important particle size is the near-mesh size particles. The near-size particles often are close to the size of the screening opening. The increasing number of near size particles will cause blinding effect. This phenomenon will decrease the travelling velocity of the processed materials and hence reduce the efficiency of the screening. It has been shown that near-size particles which will cause the blind of the screen have a maximum size of 1.1 times opening. Feed stream should be treated to decrease the existence of near size particles before screening.

Other characteristics

Other characteristics such as moisture content of the feed; open area of the screen deck; shape of the particles and the screen length also affect the process. High percentage of moisture may lead to aggregation of the materials and increase oversize materials which can block the passage of the undersize materials.

== Waste stream ==
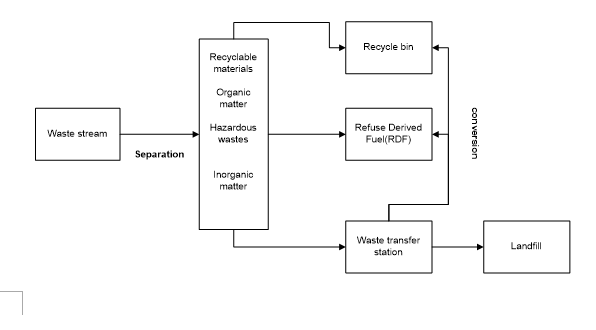
Waste stream post-treatment flowsheet

Through tumbler screening is applied in a variety of processing, the waste stream treatment for tumbler screening becomes very important in industry. At present, the most effective and environmental way to treat the waste stream is classification processing. Just as the figure shows, the waste is being separated at beginning to classify the waste material into recyclable material, hazardous waste, organic matter and inorganic matter. Then transferring the recyclable material to recycle bin for reuse, collecting and composting the non-toxic organic matter as refuse-derived fuel (RDF) and send the hazardous waste and unusable inorganic matter to landfill. In addition, it is also possible to convert some waste into useful material by chemical process. All these activities aim to minimize the amount of waste to landfill; this will contribute to reducing the environmental damage of waste and increase the resource recovery of source and energy.

Generally, there are two ways to separate the waste material into different classes which includes mechanical separation and manual separation.

- Mechanical separation aims to prepare the waste stream for manual separation which could separate metals, plastics, glasses and some other components easily and fast by many different types of sorting method and machines.
- The manual separation divides into positive sorting and negative sorting, positive sorting aims to collect the recyclable material from waste stream and negative sorting aims to remove the hazardous and unusable waste out of waste stream. Positive sorting requires a higher quality but low collection rate; on the other hand, negative sorting allows a high collection rate but low quality. It is possible increase the effectiveness with a good controlling of manual separation. A good separation of waste contributes to further treatment of the waste stream and increases the efficiency of the waste treatment system.

== Process design ==
Tumbler screening machines are composed of a screen box, screen, vibrators, damping spring device, a chassis, and other components. The screen box is vibrated by using cylinder-type eccentric shaft vibration exciter with consistent amplitude vibrator mounted on the side panel screen box and V-belt driven by a motor, which produces centrifugal force. The screen side plate is made of high-quality steel plate with bolt or rivet connections on side panels, beams, ring groove and chassis. Furthermore, the vibrators mounted on panel screen box are rotated by the motor through the coupling, provided a centrifugal inertial force to vibrate the sieve. The materials on the inclined surface of the sieve screen would be vibrated by the screen box in a continuous throwing motion. As this happens, particles smaller than the s

Unfortunately, a certain percentage of fine particles usually remain on the above screen after the oscillation. Moreover, without good maintenance, long-term usage may cause wearing of the screen surface, which may lead to oversize particles fall through screen. The efficiency of tumbler screening machine η can be expressed as: η = M_{p}÷M_{F}, where M_{p} is the mass of fine particles which pass through the screen surface during the operation of tumbler screening machine, and MF is the mass of fine particles which in the initial feed of material to the tumbler screening machine.

The efficiency of tumbler screening machine is affected by following factors:

- Machine factors (e.g. the material of machine, the width and length of machine, the amplitude of vibration, the speed of revolution)
- Screen surface factors (e.g. type and size of screen pore, the inclined angle of screen surface)
- Initial feed (e.g. the size and distribution of initial feed material)

== 21st-century developments ==
The segmented screening inserts have one round central segmental with six to eight outer segments. This technique has the advantage that it can withstand significantly higher loadings, gives longer service life, and maintenance and spare parts costs are low, as the entire screen insert is not replaced for every screen tear. Less area is required for changing screen.

Out-feed from a tumbler screening machine can be monitored by proximity-type signal transmitter, which detects overload, blockage or screen breakage, by a change in the out-feed layer height which shows deviation from the optimum operating condition. Faulty production can be easily avoided.

The fine balancing procedure called multi-balance aids in almost eliminating the residual imbalances in tumbler screening machines, thus leading to less risk of vibration and resonance effects in steel fabrications or concrete buildings. The highly flexible docking system uses a pneumatically-operated lifting system with lifting rods, and puts no additional weight on machine. It accelerates the process of inspection/ changing of screen significantly.

Another significant technical advancement in Tumbler screening includes the combination of ultrasound and air to clean extremely small openings for better screening efficiency.
