= Val Britton =

American artist (born 1977)

- Born: 1977 (age 48–49); Livingston, New Jersey, U.S.
- Education: Rhode Island School of Design, California College of the Arts
- Occupation: Artist

Val Britton (born 1977 in Livingston, New Jersey) is an American artist, best known for her works on paper and installations. She creates abstract collage works using paper and other mixed media that reference the language of maps, network diagrams and astronomical photography. She lived in the San Francisco Bay Area for 14 years, and as of 2018, she lives in Seattle, Washington.

== Biography ==
Val Britton was born in 1977 in Livingston, New Jersey, her father was a long haul truck driver. She has said in interviews, when she was young her father died and that has influenced the visual language of her work.

She received her B.F.A. in Printmaking in 1999 from Rhode Island School of Design (RISD) in Providence, Rhode Island. After RISD she moved to Brooklyn, and in 2004 she moved to San Francisco to attend graduate school. Britton received her M.F.A. from California College of the Arts (CCA) in 2006.

In 2010, Britton served at the Artist in Residence Program at Recology San Francisco and produced an exhibition called Index to Selected Stars. Index to Selected Stars featured collage work made with various types of tape, inks and various types of found paper.

In 2014, Gallery Wendi Norris in San Francisco presented Val Britton's first San Francisco gallery solo show entitled Passage.

== Exhibitions ==
This is a list of select exhibitions by Val Britton, in order by descending year.

=== Group shows ===
- 2010 – Index to Selected Stars, Recology San Francisco Artist-in-Residence Program, San Francisco
- 2012 – CES Contemporary, Laguna Beach
- 2012 – Here Be Dragons: Mapping Information and Imagination, Intersection for the Arts, San Francisco
- 2013 – Intimate Immensity, San Jose Institute of Contemporary Art (ICA), San Jose
- 2015 – Frontyard / Backyard, Palo Alto Art Center, Palo Alto
- 2015–2016 – Work In Progress: Investigations South of Market at Yerba Buena Center for the Arts, San Francisco
- 2016 – Djerassi: A Legacy exhibition, Ascent Private Capital Management, San Francisco

=== Solo shows ===
- 2012–2013 – The Continental Interior (Solo Show), San Francisco Arts Commission Gallery, San Francisco
- 2013 – Terra incognita (Solo Show), CES Contemporary, Laguna Beach
- 2013 – Cosmology (Solo Show), Foley Gallery, New York
- 2014 – Passage (Solo Show), Gallery Wendi Norris, San Francisco
- 2016 – Transmissions (Solo Show), Gallery Wendi Norris, San Francisco

== Permanent collections ==
- Voyage, located in connecting corridor departures level between domestic Terminals 1 and 2 (in between Virgin and Delta Air Lines), San Francisco International Airport
- Achenbach Foundation for Graphic Arts at Legion of Honor (museum)
- New York Public Library
- New-York Historical Society
- Library of Congress
- Alameda County Art Collection
- San Jose Museum of Art

== Awards ==
- 2015 – Fleishhacker Foundation, Eureka Fellowship Awardee
- 2010 – Pollock-Krasner Foundation Grant

== Publications ==
- Val Britton / Reverberations (Gallery Wendi Norris, San Francisco), 2016.
- Harmon, Katharine. The Map As Art: Contemporary Artists Explore Cartography (Princeton Architectural Press, New York), 2009.
