= Justin Gignac =

American artist (born 1981)

- Born: June 15, 1981 (age 45)
- Occupation: Artist
- Known for: NYC Garbage

Justin Gignac (born June 15, 1981 (Note: According to his Twitter account.)) is a freelance artist best known for creating NYC Garbage and Wants For Sale, and his work on Elf Yourself.

== Early life and career ==
He studied at the School of Visual Arts in New York City, graduating in 2002. Early in his career, he worked as an art director and creative director at advertising agencies before pursuing independent artistic and entrepreneurial projects. During and after the Travis Kelce and Taylor Swift wedding, he collected trash outside the wedding and sold it online, where it sold out shortly after.
