= Waste by country =

Waste, unwanted or unusable material, varies in type and quantity in different countries.

== Developed nations ==
Developed countries produce more waste per capita because they have higher levels of consumption. There are higher proportions of plastics, metals, and paper in the municipal solid waste stream and there are higher labour costs. As countries continue developing, there is a reduction in biological solid waste and ash. Per capita waste generation in OECD countries has increased by 14% since 1990, and 35% since 1980. Waste generation generally grows at a rate slightly lower than GDP in these countries. Developed countries consume more than 60% of the world industrial raw materials and only comprise 22% of the world's population. As a nation, the USA generates more waste than any other nation in the world with 4.5 pounds (2.0 kg) of municipal solid waste (MSW) per person per day, fifty five percent of which is contributed as residential garbage.

== Developing nations ==
Developing nations produce lower levels of waste per capita with a higher proportion of organic material in the municipal solid waste stream. If measured by weight, organic (biodegradable) residue constitutes at least 50% of waste in developing countries. Labour costs are relatively low but waste management is generally a higher proportion of municipal expenditure. As urbanization continues, municipal solid waste grows faster than urban populations because of increasing consumption and shortening product life spans.

== Transboundary issues with waste ==
Waste is shipped between countries for disposal and this can create problems in the target country.

Electronic waste is commonly shipped to developing countries for recycling, reuse or disposal. The Basel Convention is a Multilateral Environmental Agreement to prevent problematic waste disposal in countries that have weaker environmental protection laws. The Convention has not prevented the formation of e-waste villages.

== Waste by country ==
- Waste in New Zealand
- Waste in the United Kingdom
- Waste in the United States
- Waste management in India

== See also ==
- Litter
- Fly-tipping
- Environmental dumping
- Marine pollution
- Marine debris
- Waste management
