= International waste =

Organic waste product from an external country or territory

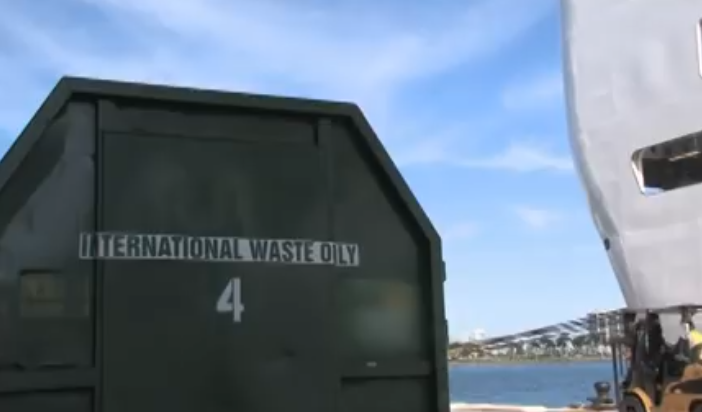
International Waste Compactor at a Marine Terminal

International waste is any organic waste product that is deemed unsafe to be released into the environment or standard municipal solid waste stream that has originated from an external country, and sometimes territory. Such waste must be treated before it can be disposed of in the municipal solid waste stream to prevent sickness and environmental damage. If not managed properly, regulated garbage can have detrimental impacts on agriculture, livestock, and crops.

== Regulations and Rules ==
=== United States ===
The United States requires that all international waste must be sterilized through incineration or an autoclave. The rules and regulations for international waste and regulated garbage are determined by USDA's APHIS and US Customs and Border Protection. Regulated garbage includes international waste, which is defined as any organic material that originates outside of the United States, with the exception of Canada. Typically, such waste is not permitted for import into the United States, but exceptions for ships and airplanes landing in US ports can be made. Regulations must be followed for any company handling IW, such as recording when garbage was received and subsequently destroyed. Waste being transported to a treatment facility must avoid all rural areas, and if it must travel through a rural area, it must be ensured that the garbage is stored in a secure leak proof fashion, using approved agents for cleaning spills, and filing paperwork when waste needs to be transported between states.

=== Canada ===
Unlike the United States, Canada does not make an exception for international waste entering from the United States. Rules and restrictions are managed by Canadian Food Inspection Agency (CFIA) and the Canada Border Services Agency (CBSA). Regulations require that this type of waste must be placed in an orange bag. Along with autoclaving and incineration, Canada also allows international waste to be buried in a landfill, however the landfill must be approved for the waste to be buried. The landfill must be 0.5 km from any livestock, precautions must be taken to prevent animals from entering, and the waste must be buried under 1.8 m of non-international waste or other covering.

=== United Kingdom ===
Known as "international catering waste" in the United Kingdom, specific regulations must be followed. This waste must be stored in "covered", "leak-proof", and "clearly labelled 'Category 1 – for disposal only'". Similar to Canada, disposing of the waste in a deep authorized landfill is acceptable. Additionally, along with incineration and autoclaving, processing the waste into biodiesel is acceptable.

== Criticism ==
Strict regulations in Canada have made it difficult to establish an international marine terminal in Cape Breton, Nova Scotia. International waste from Marine terminals needed to be disposed of, and the only approves sites were both located in Dartmouth, on the other side of the province, meaning that the cost of disposal would be too high to allow foreign ships to enter the terminal.
