= Biowaste =

Biowaste may refer to:

- Biodegradable waste
  - Food waste
  - Human waste
  - Green waste
  - Brown waste
- Biomedical waste
