= Naples waste management crisis =

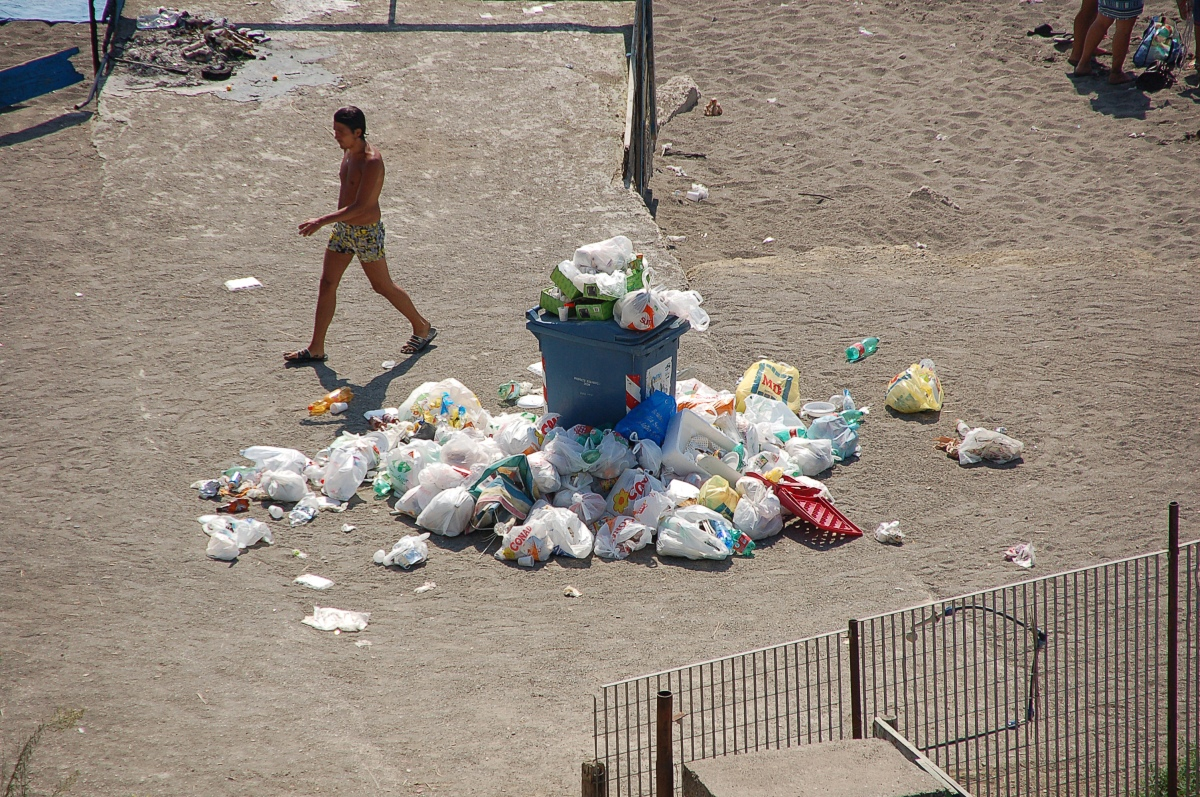
Uncollected garbage in Bacoli, Naples, 2010

The Naples waste management crisis is a series of events surrounding the lack of waste collection and illegal toxic waste dumping in and around the Province of Naples (now known as the Metropolitan City of Naples), Campania, Italy, beginning in the 1980s. In 1994, Campania formally declared a state of emergency, ending in 2008. However, the crisis has had negative effects on the environment and on human health, specifically in an area that became known as the triangle of death. Due to the burning of accumulated toxic wastes in overfilled landfills and the streets, Naples's surrounding areas became known as the "Land of pyres" (terra dei fuochi). The crisis is largely attributed to government failure to efficiently manage waste, as well as the illegal waste disposal by the Camorra criminal organization.

== The emergency ==
In the 1980s and 1990s, Naples and the Campania region in southern Italy suffered from the dumping of solid waste into overfilled landfills. With no regional waste management plan in place, the region's main landfill in Pianura became overfilled with both hazardous and non-hazardous waste, with waste also coming from northern Italy. In February 1994, a state of emergency was declared in Campania by Prime Minister Carlo Azeglio Ciampi, and created the Committee for the Waste Emergency in Campania (Commissariato di Governo per l'emergenza rifiuti in Campania). The Pianura landfill was closed in 1996.

== Government response and the "emergency of the emergency" ==
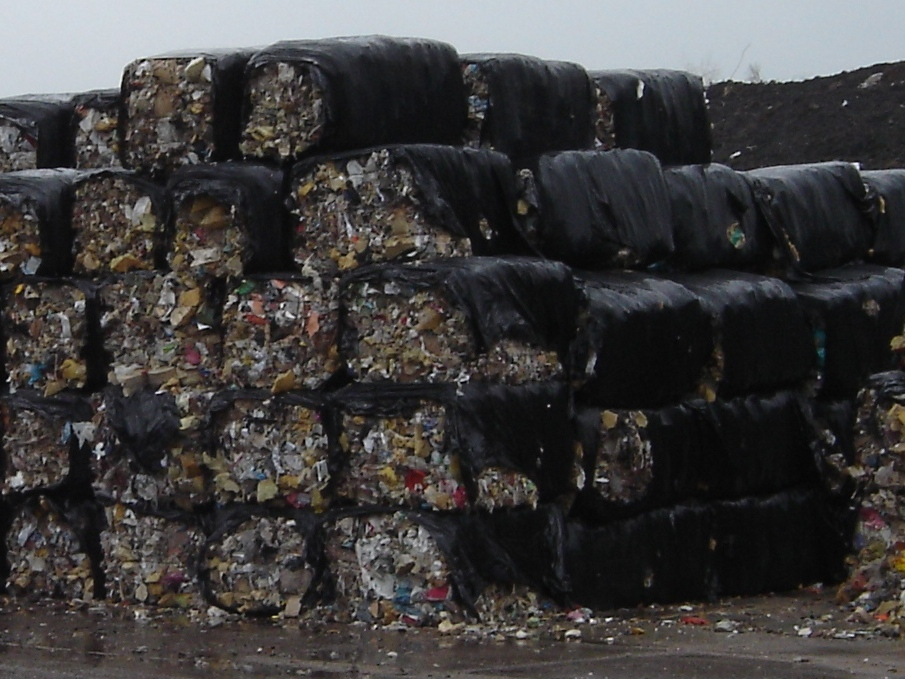
Some "ecobales" being stored, destined for incineration

After the first commissioner was removed, Antonio Rastrelli took over in 1996. In July 1997, a regional waste management plan was finally approved. In 1998, he initiated a request for tender to companies to build waste treatment plants, including incinerators, to generate refuse-derived fuel from the "ecobales" (bales formed of refuse). By the end of 1998, FIBE, a consortium of Salini Impregilo won the tender, which was highly based on its low cost rather than its proposed use of technology to manage the waste crisis. By December 1999, all regional landfills had reached capacity, and waste started to accumulate in the streets. In 2001, the first plant was built to manage the ecobales, but was not capable of handling the daily amount of waste, nor was the quality of the waste suitable for incineration. FIBE was given the power to decide the location of facilities without local consultation or environmental impact assessment, and by 2002, had planned to build an incinerator in Acerra and Santa Maria la Fossa. The president of Campania, Antonio Bassolino, was appointed to the commission in 2000, but his inability and failings to address the waste in the city highlighted by the media destroyed the image of his administration; he left the commission in 2004. In 2002, landfills in Tufino and Montecorvino Pugliano were closed due to toxic waste pollution in groundwater. While the local residents in these communities protested, which turned violent at times with police, against the construction of incinerators; this period became known as "the emergency of the emergency".

In September 2004, a scientific publication in the Lancet Oncology coined the term "triangle of death" with regards to the region comprising Acerra, Nola and Marigliano, due to their reported higher cancer rates compared to the whole of Italy. The report was met with criticism by the National Research Council, dismissing the methods used by Senior and Mazza as biased. Despite this, it sparked the first interest and concern into this matter, and has become the most cited source of evidence throughout the crisis.

By 2005, incinerators had still yet to be built, and the accumulation and storage demands of the ecobales rose. The Camorra started to buy land that was subsequently rented to FIBE to store the ecobales. This produced financial hardship for FIBE, and further caused its incapability to satisfy contractual commitments. On 30 November 2005, the Italian government rescinded its contract with FIBE.

== New tender and Berlusconi ==
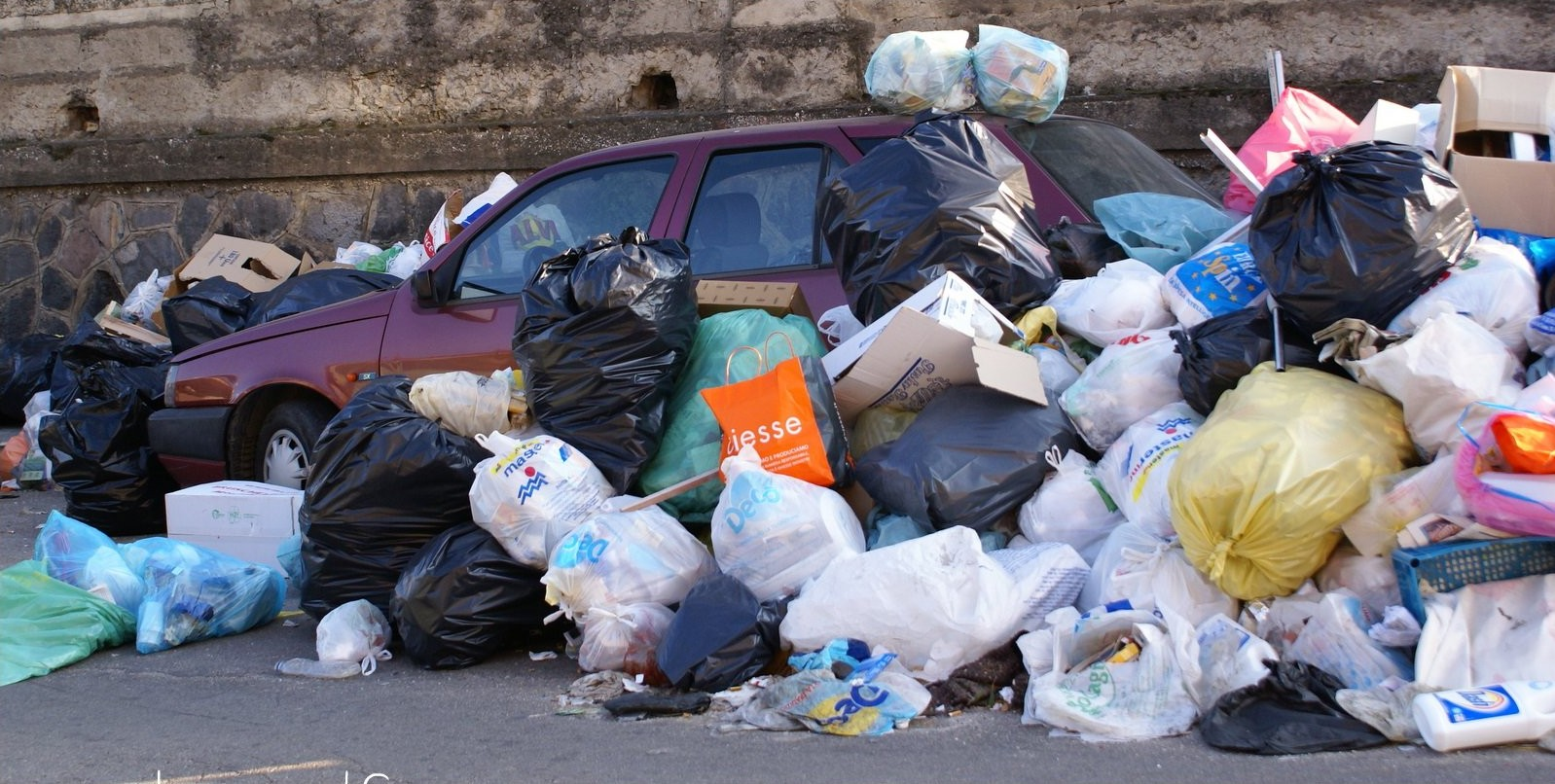
A car flooded with waste in Aversa in February 2008

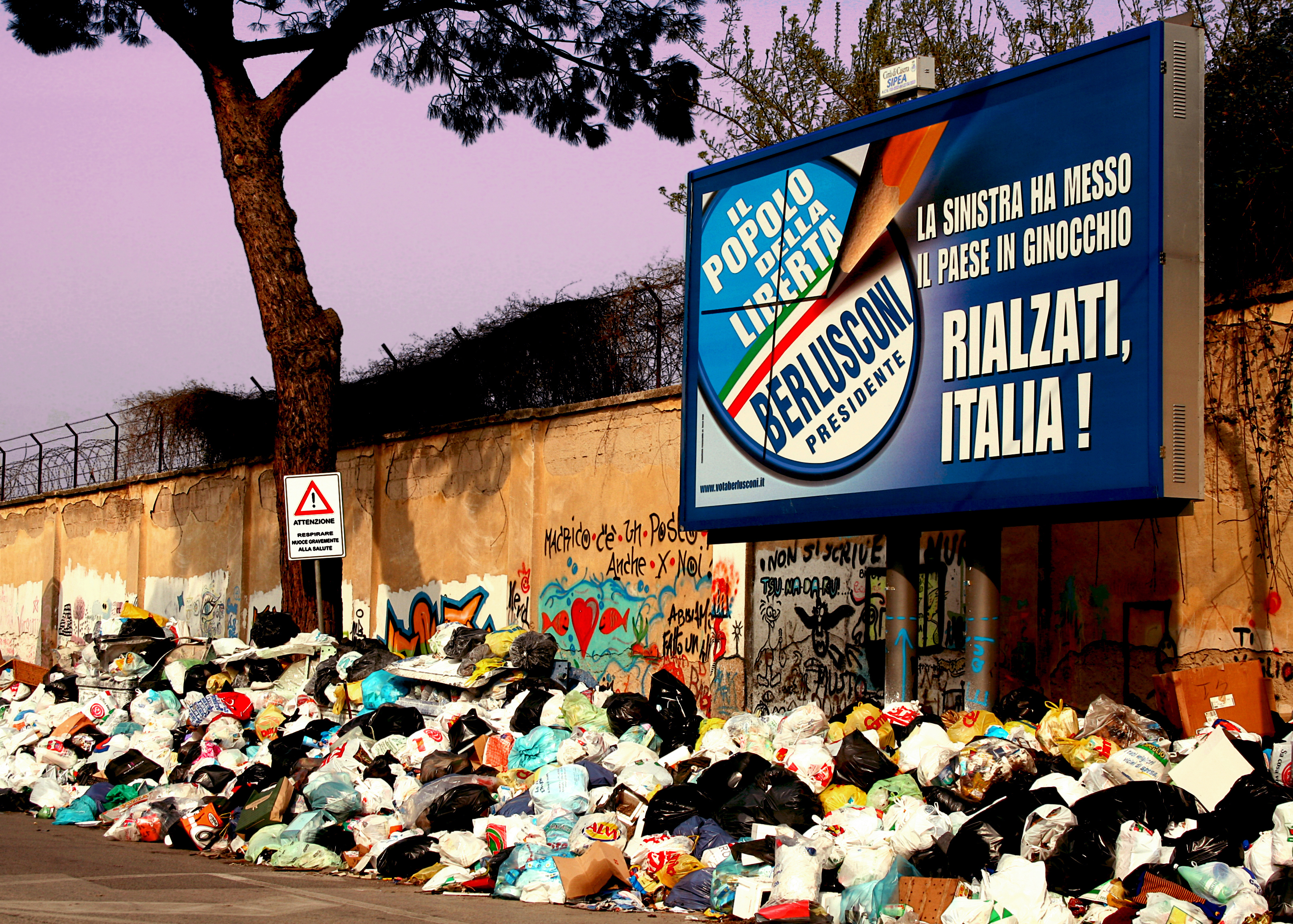
Campaign poster for 2008 general election surrounded by waste in Caserta

After a new tender was issued, one was not secured until October 2008, with A2A. Before the tender was secured, in 2007, the government of Italian prime minister Romano Prodi, announced plans for the solution of the crisis, including the shipment of tons of ecobales by train to Germany, as well as re-opening landfills, including in Pianura and Chiaiano (opened February 2009), which led to further violent protests. Berlusconi took immediate action, and held his first cabinet meeting in Naples. He then appointed a new waste commissioner, Guido Bertolaso (then the head of the Civil Protection Department). In May 2008, the newly elected prime minister Silvio Berlusconi, decreed that protests in the vicinity of landfills, incinerators or any plant related to waste management, is a penal felony. In addition, 700 tons of rubbish per day were sent to incinerators in Hamburg, Germany, while new incinerators were built locally. In July 2008, Berlusconi started the Operazione Strade Pulite (Operation Clean Roads), which brought in the Italian Armed Forces to aid in garbage removal from the streets. By 17 July 2008, Berlusconi declared that the emergency had ended due to the absence of waste in the streets. Seven million tons of waste stored as ecobales, destined for incineration, had been accumulated. However, garbage soon started to refill the streets—stating that the streets would be cleaned by 31 December 2009.

On 18 March 2009, the Acerra incineration facility was finally completed at a cost of over €350 million. The incinerator burns 600,000 tons of waste per year to produce refuse-derived fuel, and the energy produced from the facility is enough to power 200,000 households per year. In June 2009, a landfill in Terzigno, inside the Vesuvius National Park, was also re-opened, which caused violent protests. In September 2010, it was reported that there were still 600 tons of waste in the streets.

Between June and November 2011, the newly elected mayor of Naples, and former antimafia magistrate, Luigi de Magistris, managed the quantity of uncollected garbage in the streets, which declined from 2,500 tons to zero. He arranged for the garbage to be transferred to the Netherlands by ship, which started in January 2012.

== Causes ==
Reports in 2008 stated that the crisis was caused at least in part by the Camorra, the powerful Campania-based mafia, which created a lucrative business in the municipal waste disposal business, mostly in the triangle of death. With the complicity of industrial companies, heavy metals, industrial waste, and chemicals and household waste are frequently mixed together, then dumped near roads and burned to avoid detection, leading to severe soil and air pollution. The phenomenon of widespread environmental crime perpetrated by criminal syndicates like the Camorra and 'Ndrangheta has given rise to the term "ecomafia".

According to Giacomo D'Alisa et al., "the situation worsened during this period as the Camorra diversified their illegal waste disposal strategy: 1) transporting and dumping hazardous waste in the countryside by truck; 2) dumping waste in illegal caves or holes; 3) mixing toxic waste with textiles to avoid explosions and then burning it; and 4) mixing toxic with urban waste for disposal in landfills and incinerators."

A Camorra member, Nunzio Perella was arrested in 1992, and began collaborating with authorities; he had stated "the rubbish is gold." The boss of the Casalesi clan, Gaetano Vassallo, admitted to systematically working for 20 years to bribe local politicians and officials to gain their acquiescence to dumping toxic waste. Giorgio Napolitano, President of Italian Republic, said in June 2008:

It is certain, not only to citizens but to the government as well, that the systematic transfer of toxic waste from industries in Northern Italy to Campania, was committed by the Camorra

— Giorgio Napolitano, 4 June 2008.

The waste management crisis is primarily a result of government failure to control illegal waste dumping. The government had attempted to mandate recycling and waste management programs, but were unable, causing the expansion of opportunities for illegal activities, which caused further barriers to solve the waste crisis.

== In popular culture ==
The crisis is featured in Roberto Saviano's 2006 book Gomorrah, the film of the same name, as well as in the fourth season of the TV series of the same name. It is also the focus of the 2007 documentary Biùtiful cauntri.
