= Bertolaso =

Bertolaso is an Italian surname. Notable people with the surname include:

- Giorgio Bertolaso (1918–2009), Italian aviator
- Guido Bertolaso (born 1950), Italian physician and state functionary
