= Triangle of death (Italy) =

Area in Campania, Italy, with a large waste dump

Coordinates: 40.94°N 14.44°E

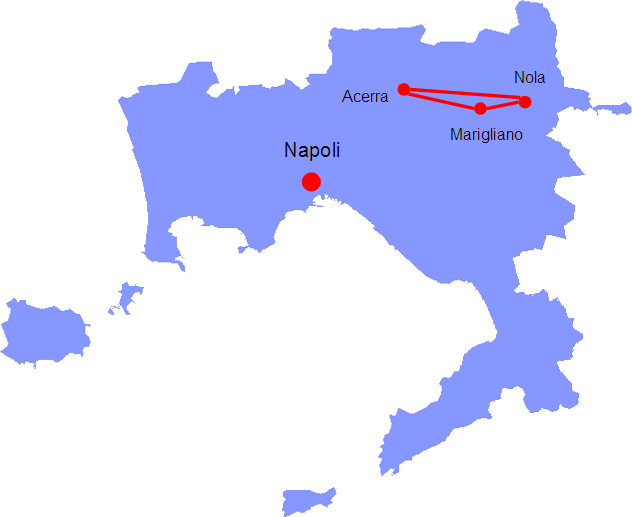
Triangle of death, comprising the municipalities of Acerra, Nola and Marigliano, to the northeast of the city of Naples, shown within the province of Naples

Map highlighting the location of the province of Naples within Italy

The triangle of death (Italian: Triangolo della morte) is an area approximately 25 km northeast of the city of Naples in the Province of Naples, Campania, Italy, that comprises the comuni of Acerra, Nola and Marigliano. This area contains the largest illegal waste dump in Europe due to a waste management crisis in the 1990s and 2000s.

The region has experienced a rise in cancer-related mortality that is linked to exposure of pollution from the illegal waste disposal by the Camorra criminal organization after regional landfills had been filled to capacity.

The phenomenon of widespread environmental crime perpetrated by criminal syndicates like the Camorra and 'Ndrangheta has given rise to the term "ecomafia".

== Etymology ==
The term "triangle of death" was first used with regard to the region in a September 2004 scientific publication in the Lancet Oncology.

== Overview ==
An estimated 550,000 people live in the triangle of death. The annual death rate per 100,000 inhabitants from liver cancer is approximately 38.4 for men and 20.8 for women in this area, as compared to the national average of 14. The death rate for bladder cancer and cancer of the central nervous system was also higher than the national average. The high death rates from cancers pointed towards the presence of illegal and improper hazardous waste disposal by various organized crime groups including the Camorra. The 2004 Lancet Oncology article noted, "Today, the difference between lawful management of waste and illegal manipulation with regard to their compliance with health regulations is very narrow, and the health risks are rising... The 5000 illegal or uncontrolled landfill sites in Italy drew particular criticism; Italy has already been warned twice for flouting the Hazardous Waste Directive and the Landfill Directive, and the EU has now referred Italy to the European Court of Justice for further action."

The report was met with criticism by the National Research Council, dismissing the methods used by Senior and Mazza as biased. Despite this, it sparked the first interest and concern into this matter, and has become the most cited source of evidence throughout the crisis.

Though some media outlets report France and Germany as waste sources, the EU has remained silent as to the sources of the waste in its criticism and demands of Italy.

In January 2025, the European Court of Human Rights ruled that Italy has violated the right to life of 2.9 million citizens living in the Triangle. The court found that Italian authorities had known about the pollution problem since 1988 but failed to address it and had not done what was necessary to protect residents' lives.

== Illegal toxic waste dumping ==
By February 1994, several regional landfills in Campania had become overfilled, and Prime Minister Carlo Azeglio Ciampi declared a state of emergency and created the Committee for the Waste Emergency in Campania (Commissariato di Governo per l'emergenza rifiuti in Campania).

By December 1999, all regional landfills had reached capacity. Reports in 2008 stated that the crisis was caused at least in part by the Camorra, the powerful Campania-based mafia, which created a lucrative business in the municipal waste disposal sector, mostly in the triangle of death. With the complicity of industrial companies, the illegal dumpers frequently mix heavy metals, industrial waste, and chemicals and household waste together, and then dump them near roads and burn them to avoid detection, leading to severe soil and air pollution.

According to Giacomo D'Alisa et al., "the situation worsened during this period as the Camorra diversified their illegal waste disposal strategy: 1) transporting and dumping hazardous waste in the countryside by truck; 2) dumping waste in illegal caves or holes; 3) mixing toxic waste with textiles to avoid explosions and then burning it; and 4) mixing toxic with urban waste for disposal in landfills and incinerators."

A Camorra member, Nunzio Perella, was arrested in 1992, and began collaborating with authorities; he had stated "the rubbish is gold." The boss of the Casalesi clan, Gaetano Vassallo, admitted to systematically working for 20 years to bribe local politicians and officials to gain their acquiescence to dumping toxic waste. Giorgio Napolitano, then President of the Italian Republic, said in June 2008:

It is certain, not only to citizens but to the government as well, that the systematic transfer of toxic waste from industries in Northern Italy to Campania was committed by the Camorra.

— Giorgio Napolitano, 4 June 2008.

== The triangle of death waste crisis ==
The triangle of death and the waste management crisis are primarily a result of government failure to control illegal waste dumping. The government had attempted to mandate recycling and waste management programs, but were unable to, causing the expansion of opportunities for illegal activities, which caused further barriers to solve the waste crisis.

Pollutants such as dioxins are found in the area, particularly around Acerra, as well as illegal waste disposal, even in the business district of Montefibre. As early as 1987, a decree of the Ministry of Environment marked Acerra "at high risk of environmental crisis".

High levels of polychlorinated biphenyls (PCBs) were detected both in the soil and in the inhabitants of the region. It is hypothesized that industrial slurry originating from Porto Marghera (industrial docklands near Venice) was disguised as compost and spread on fields in the Acerra countryside by the Casalesi clan, often with help from the landowners.

In one case, a company had its assets seized during a 2006 investigation in which it was alleged that the company had illegally disposed of waste from industries in the regions of Veneto and Tuscany in the territories of Bacoli, Giugliano and Qualiano. Approximately one million tonnes of toxic waste are said to have been disposed of, earning €27 million. The company was already the subject of a 2003 investigation. In another case, a tank full of toxic substances was found buried in an illegal dump, in Marigliano.

The illegal burning of waste, for example to recover copper from wiring, is known to release dioxins into the atmosphere. Such fires are easily hidden among legitimate incineration resulting from the more general waste disposal problem, and the illegal burning of hazardous materials was particularly noted during 2007 and 2008. The presence of fires in the north area of Naples led author Roberto Saviano to use Terra dei fuochi ("Land of pyres") as a chapter title in his book Gomorrah.

In 2000, a Parliamentary Commission inquiry about waste discovered some 800,000 tonnes of mud in Pianura landfill, coming from ACNA of Cengio in Naples, and the Italian Procura della Repubblica found (through telephone wiretappings) some irregularities in the waste disposal into the landfill of Villaricca, managed by FIBA (a company of the Impregilo group).

== Opposition to landfills ==
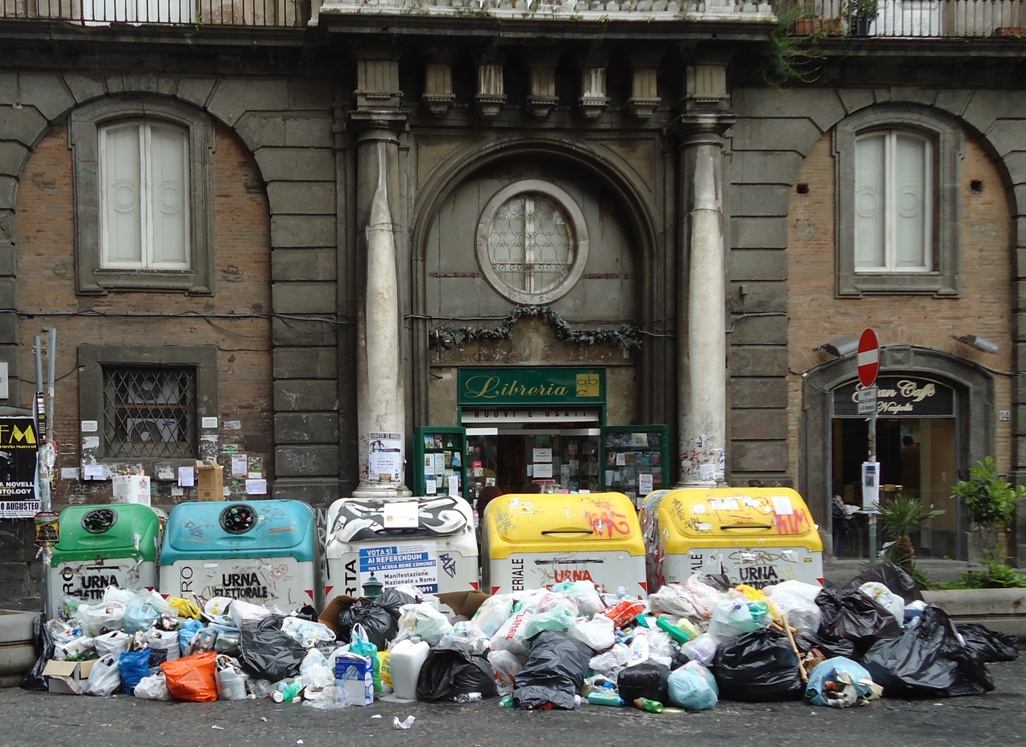
Uncollected garbage in Naples, 2011

Between 2007 and 2008, the waste commissioner Guido Bertolaso (the head of the civil protection department), planned to open a landfill but this was opposed by residents of Chiaiano. There was similar resistance in Pianosa to reopening a closed landfill proposed by government commissioner Giovanni De Gennaro. Some of the protests turned violent, and in May 2008, it became a crime to protest in the vicinity of landfills, incinerators or any plant related to waste management. It is alleged that there was collusion between local political interests and organised crime over building interests.

By 17 July 2008, Berlusconi declared that the emergency had ended.

The incinerator of Acerra has also received backlash in the local area. In 2009, the Acerra incineration facility was completed at a cost of over €350 million. The incinerator burns 600,000 tons of waste per year to produce refuse-derived fuel. The energy produced from the facility is enough to power 200,000 households per year.

== Epidemiological research ==
In 2007, research conducted by the World Health Organization, Italian Istituto Superiore di Sanità, Consiglio Nazionale delle Ricerche and Campania Region collected data on cancer and congenital abnormalities in 196 municipalities covering the period between 1994 and 2002 found abnormally high disease incidence. These abnormal patterns may correlate to areas where there are uncontrolled waste sites. However, this work also highlighted the difficulty in determining causality and in establishing a link between increased death and malformation rates and waste disposal.

After the Senior and Mazza study, several other studies have been conducted to attempt to definitively link elevated cancer rates to waste exposure. A government-made waste-exposure index that classifies areas of the Campania region as high (5 on index) or low (1 on index) risk based on the type of wastes present in surrounding dumping sites, total waste volume greater than 10,000 cubic metres, and the likelihood of releases on water, soil and air was created. Statistically significant excess relative risks were found for several cancer types in the triangle of death, however, methods often struggle to account for lifestyle confounders such as tobacco consumption and occupation which could skew the results.

A US Navy study denied any real ill effects to on-base personnel while however advising their off-base personnel to drink bottled water citing polluted wells. The US Navy report denied any signs of nuclear waste dumping and instead related the traces of uranium to volcanic activity.

== Pollution and agriculture exports ==
More than half of the regional land in Campania is used for agriculture, and therefore the economy of the region is adversely affected by the waste crisis. Between January and March 2007, 30,000 kilograms of waste were burned on agricultural land, with a revenue of more than €118,000. In the region, over 12,000 cattle, river buffaloes and sheep had been culled before 2006. High levels of mortality and abnormal foetuses were also recorded in farms in Acerra linked to elevated levels of dioxin. Local studies have shown higher than permissible levels of lead in vegetables grown in the area. The government blames the Mafia's illegal garbage disposal racket.

In March 2008, dioxin was found in buffalo milk from farms in Caserta. While only 2.8% of farms in Campania were affected, the sale of dairy products from Campania collapsed in both domestic and global markets.

A chain reaction followed, in which several countries including Japan, China, Russia and Germany took various measures ranging from the mere raising of the attention threshold to the suspension of imports. The Italian institutions activated almost immediately, even in response to pressing requests from the European Union, a series of checks and suspended, in some cases, the sale of dairy products from the incriminated provinces. Tests had shown levels of dioxins higher than normal in at least 14% of samples taken in the provinces of Naples, Caserta and Avellino. In the provinces of Salerno and Benevento, no control indicated dioxins positivity. In any case, the contamination has affected, in a limited defined manner, the farms used to produce the PDO buffalo mozzarella DOP. On 19 April, China definitively removed the ban on mozzarella, originally activated on 28 March 2008, and tests held in December 2013 in Germany on behalf of four Italian consumer associations have highlighted dioxin and heavy metal levels at least five times lower than the legal limit.

== See also ==
- Cancer Alley
- Changzhou Foreign Languages School controversy
- Toxic waste dumping by the 'Ndrangheta
- Smokey Mountain and the Payatas dumpsite
- Valley of the Drums
