= Acerra =

- Comune
- Comune di Acerra
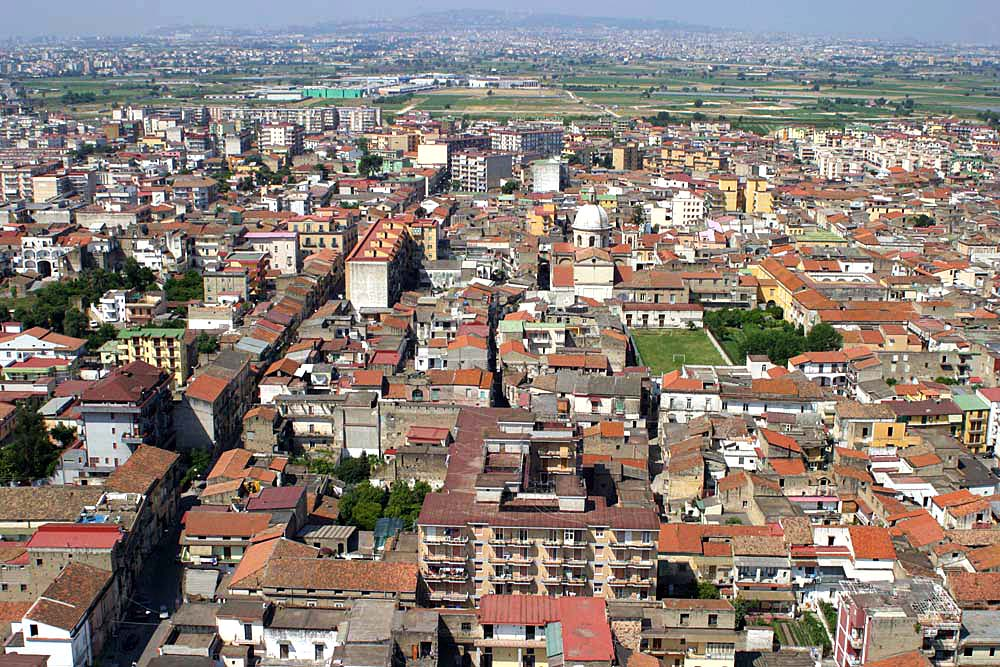
- Aerial view of Acerra

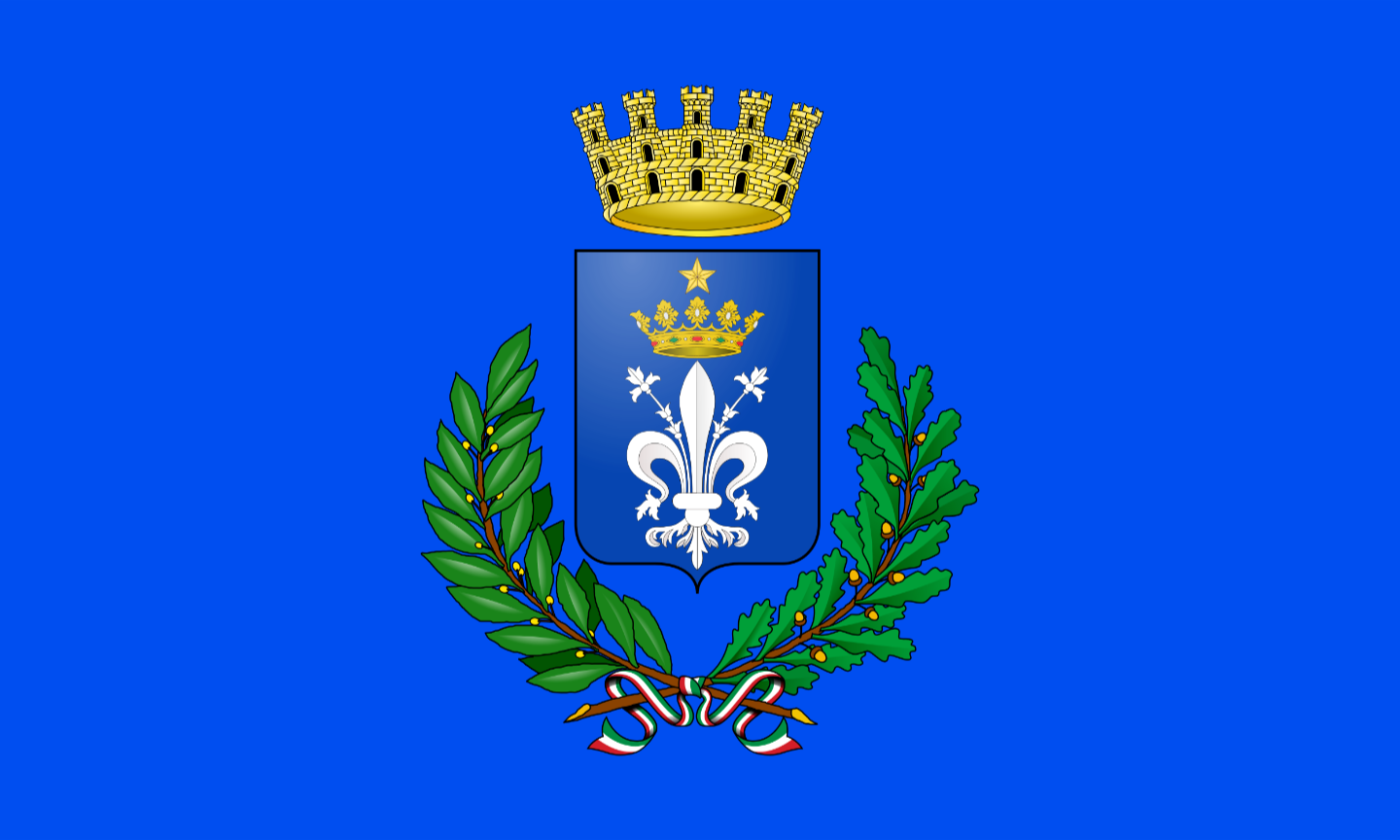
- Flag Coat of arms

- Location of Acerra in Italy Acerra (Campania)
- Coordinates: 40°57′N 14°22′E
- Country: Italy
- Region: Campania
- Metropolitan city: Naples (NA)
- Frazioni: Gaudello, Pezzalunga

Government
  - Mayor: Tito D’Errico (UdC)

Area
  - Total: 54.71 km^{2} (21.12 sq mi)
- Elevation: 26 m (85 ft)

Population (2026)
  - Total: 58,585
  - Density: 1,071/km^{2} (2,773/sq mi)
- Demonym: Acerrani
- Time zone: UTC+1 (CET)
  - Summer (DST): UTC+2 (CEST)
- Postal code: 80011
- Dialing code: 081
- Patron saint: St. Cuono and Conello
- Saint day: 29 May
- Website: Official website

Acerra (Italian: [aˈtʃɛrra]) is a city and comune (municipality) in the Metropolitan City of Naples in the region of Campania, southern Italy, about 15 kilometres (9 miles) northeast of the capital in Naples. It has 58,585 inhabitants.

It is part of the Agro Acerrano plain.

== History ==
Acerra is one of the most ancient cities of the region, likely founded by the Osci with the name of Akeru (Latin: Acerrae, Ancient Greek: Ἀχέρραι). It first appears in history as an independent city during the great war of the Campanians and Latins against Rome. Shortly after the conclusion, in 332 BC, the Acerrani, in common with several other Campanian cities, obtained the Roman "civitas", without the right of suffrage. The period at which the latter privilege was granted upon them is not mentioned, however, it is certain that they ultimately obtained full rights over the Roman citizens.

In the Second Punic War, the city was faithful to the Roman alliance, on which account it was besieged by Hannibal in 216 BC, following which the city was quickly abandoned by the inhabitants in despair, leading the city to be plundered and burnt. After the expulsion of Hannibal from Campania, the Acerrani, with the consent of the Roman senate, returned to and rebuilt their city in 210 BC.

Acerra served as a Roman base during the Social War in 90 BC. During the war, it was besieged by the Samnite General, Gaius Papius Mutilus, but offered so vigorous a resistance that he was unable to reduce it. Virgil praises the fertility of its territory, but the town itself had suffered so much from the frequent inundations of the river Clanius, on which it was situated, that it was in his time almost deserted. It subsequently received a colony under Augustus, and Strabo speaks of it in conjunction with Nola and Nuceria, apparently as a place of some consequence. It does not seem, however, to have retained its colonial rank, but is mentioned by Pliny as an ordinary municipal town.

In 826 the Lombards built a castle here, which was later demolished by Bono of Naples. In 881 it was sacked by the Saracens. Later it became a Norman possession, the seat of a county. As part of the Kingdom of Naples, it was a domain of the Aquino, the Origlia, the Orsini del Balzo and, from 1496 until 1812, the Cardenas. From 1927 it was part of the province of Terra di Lavoro.

On 1 October 1943, several units of the Hermann Göring Division massacred nearly 90 civilians, including 7 children and 14 women in one of the bloodiest massacres in Campania; a memorial was erected in honor and on behalf of the victims.

=== Modern issues ===
From the 1990s to the 2000s, a waste management crisis broke out in the city as a result of illegal dumping by the Pellini brothers, Camorra members. The majority of the waste was dumped in the region between Acerra, Nola, and Marigliano, referred to as the "Triangle of Death". A 2004 study by Alfredo Mazza published in The Lancet Oncology revealed that deaths by cancer in the area are much higher than the European average. In 2009, the Acerra incineration facility was completed at a cost of more than €350 million. The incinerator burns 600,000 tons of waste per year in order to produce refuse-derived fuel. The energy produced from the facility is enough to power 200,000 households per year.

After this incinerator was built in 2009, there was yet again another trash epidemic in 2011. There were more than 2,000 tons of uncollected trash, with over 170 troops deployed into the area. Since 2008, the 2011 crisis is the second time troops have been deployed in order to deal with the issue. Prime Minister Silvio Berlusconi ordered the troops to "return Naples to being a civilized city."

=== Coronavirus pandemic ===
The citizens of Acerra were told to lock down during March 2020, in Acerra specifically, since it is such a small town the residents were very skeptical about the virus. In late March, there was an incident in which a woman arrived in Acerra after travelling to Lombardy, which was the epicenter of the coronavirus outbreak in Italy. Said woman arrived in Acerra on March 9, the day after the lockdown was announced. The mayor of Acerra at the time, Rafaele Lettieri, did talk about this issue, without naming the woman. She responded on Facebook, stating she followed all the precautions that were required of her, including self-isolating. After the issue was addressed by the mayor, residents of Acerra took to the streets in order to express that they wanted the woman to be removed from the town.

== Climate ==
The warm season lasts for nearly three months, from mid June to mid September. During this time, the average high, daily is more than 83 degrees Fahrenheit or 28.3 degrees Celsius. Typically, the hottest month in Acerra is August. In August, the typical low is 69 degrees Fahrenheit or 20.5 degrees Celsius, while the typical high is 88 degrees Fahrenheit or 31 degrees Celsius. In regards to the colder season, this season lasts for about four months, late November to late March. The typical high during this time is 62 degrees Fahrenheit or 16.6 degrees Celsius, however the coldest month is January. During January, the typical low temperature in Fahrenheit is 41 degrees Fahrenheit or 5 degrees Celsius, with the high temperature being 55 degrees Fahrenheit or 12.7 degrees Celsius.

Climate data for Acerra
Month	Jan	Feb	Mar	Apr	May	Jun	Jul	Aug	Sep	Oct	Nov	Dec	Year
Mean daily maximum °C (°F)	13 (55)	14 (57)	16 (61)	19 (66)	24 (75)	28 (82)	31 (88)	31 (88)	27 (81)	23 (73)	18 (64)	14 (57)	22 (71)
Daily mean °C (°F)	9 (48)	9 (48)	12 (54)	15 (59)	19 (66)	23 (73)	26 (79)	26 (79)	22 (72)	18 (64)	13 (55)	10 (50)	17 (62)
Mean daily minimum °C (°F)	5 (41)	5 (41)	7 (45)	10 (50)	14 (57)	18 (64)	20 (68)	20 (68)	17 (63)	13 (55)	9 (48)	6 (43)	12 (54)
Average precipitation mm (inches)	64.3 (2.53)	60.5 (2.38)	53.4 (2.10)	49.3 (1.94)	31.8 (1.25)	20.4 (0.80)	15.5 (0.61)	19.9 (0.78)	56.4 (2.22)	74.8 (2.94)	97.4 (3.83)	73.7 (2.90)	617.4 (24.28)

Acerra is not a city that receives much precipitation, a day that would be consider to be a "wet day" would be a day in which there are 1.0 millimetre or 0.04 inches of precipitation. The wettest month of the year is November, during which about 10 days of the month are considered "wet days". During the wet season, there is typically less than a fourth of the days that receive the 1.0 millimetre or 0.04 inches of precipitation. Acerra also does tend to be humid, however, throughout different seasons the humidity varies greatly. In the area, the more humid months tend to be from early June to late September.

== Demographics ==
Historical population
Year	Pop.	±%
1861	11,815	—
1871	13,693	+15.9%
1881	15,165	+10.8%
1901	16,397	+8.1%
1911	17,878	+9.0%
1921	18,564	+3.8%
1931	21,208	+14.2%
1936	21,937	+3.4%
1951	25,415	+15.9%
1961	26,650	+4.9%
1971	30,842	+15.7%
1981	36,052	+16.9%
1991	41,311	+14.6%
2001	45,688	+10.6%
2011	56,465	+23.6%
2021	58,494	+3.6%
Source: ISTAT

As of 2026, the population is 58,585, of which 49.2% are male, and 50.8% are female. Minors make up 19.4% of the population, and seniors make up 15.8%.

=== Immigration ===
As of 2025, immigrants make up 5.0% of the population. The 5 largest foreign countries of birth are Ukraine, Nigeria, Albania, Morocco, and Algeria.

== Crime ==
Acerra is not an extremely safe place, though it has improved. In the more southern areas of Italy, crime and gangs tend to be more prevalent. In Acerra, a major factor contributing to the crime is the fact that more than a quarter of the children in the town are not enrolled in school. In the 1990s, the most present gang was La Camorra, whom were often known for having children die in their crimes during this time. Though technically, the area is not violent, it is not safe due to the fact that there is so much organized crime. In Italy as a whole, they actually have a lower homicide rate than New York City. The term "Mafia" has been coined to describe these groups of organized crime.

== Sights ==
Sight Name	Background Information	Images
Acerra Cathedral	Originally built over an ancient temple of Hercules and remade in the 19th century. It houses some Baroque cavasses from the 17th century. Annexed is the Bishop's Palace. The Cathedral was also remade in the 19th century.	The Acerra Cathedral.
Archaeological area of Suessula	A pre-Roman settlement in the Campania planes. Since 1996, Salerno University has been conducting research on the area. During this research it was also discovered that individuals had likely known about the area as early as the beginning of the 1900s.	Drawing depicting the original area of Suessula. Image of the current remains of the area of Suessula.
Mount Vesuvius	Also referred to as Italian Vesuvio, the volcano is still considered to be active. Resting near the Gulf of Naples on the Plane of Campania. Mount Vesuvius last erupted in March 1944, however, it is still considered to be one of the most dangerous volcanoes today because there are about 3 million people living near it (within 20 miles) today.	Image of Mount Vesuvius taken from a plane.
Pompeii	On August 24, 79 CE, Mount Vesuvius erupted sending ash, volcanic debris, and molten lava through the air. In turn, Pompeii was covered and kept frozen in time to be unearthed in the 1700s. At the time of the eruption there was an estimated 10,000 to 20,000 people living in Pompeii. The city is one of the biggest pieces of physical proof of Roman Civilization, the now city gives a wonderful images of what daily life may have looked like at the time.	Victim of the Eruption on Display Pompeii Remains

== Culture ==
=== Architecture ===
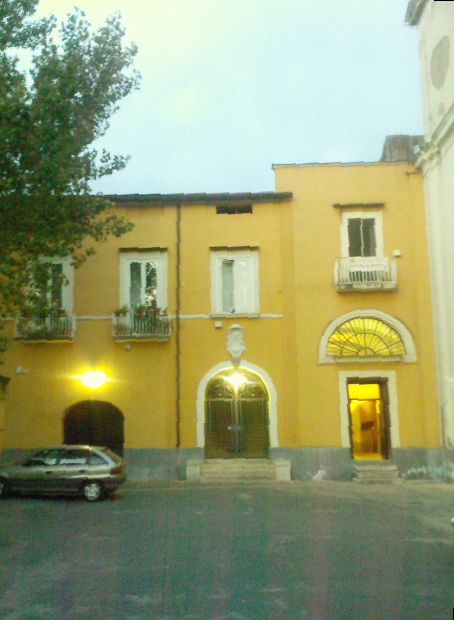
Typical Architecture in Acerra, depiction the Neapolitan Yellow Tuff Stone

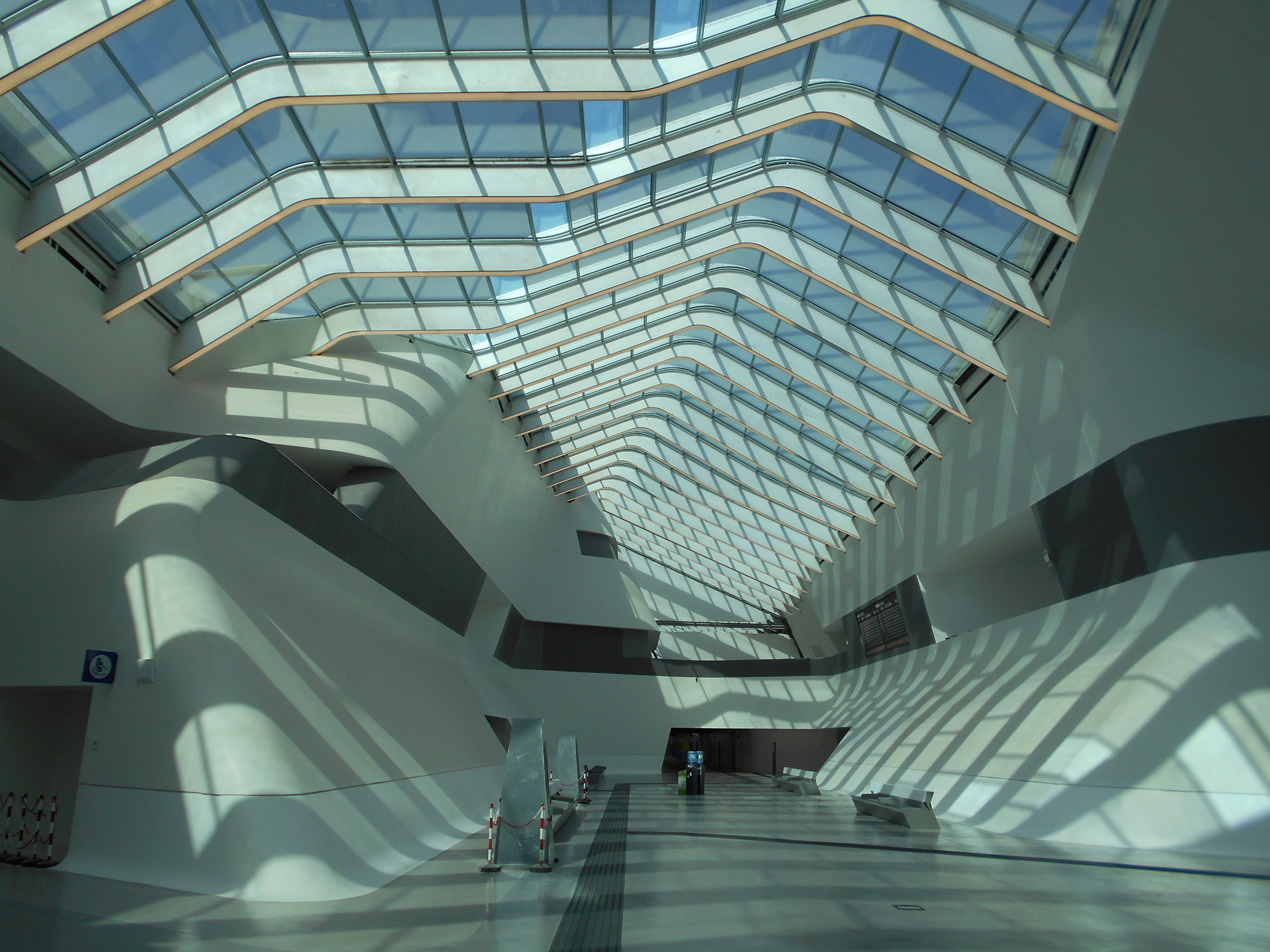
Napoli Afragola Train Station

Acerra has a rich variety of architecture, for example, more modern train stations like the Napoli Afragola Station, compared to older buildings like the Acerra Cathedral. The Napoli Afragola Station was designed by Zaha Hadid Architects, constructed in 2017 with an area of more than 3000 square meters. Since Acerra is so close to Naples, Italy, it has adopted many of its architectural styles. Including, but not limited to influences from the Roman Empire, the Renaissance, and the Baroque and Neoclassical periods. Many buildings are constructed with stone, due to their geographical surroundings, due to this close connection, it is often referred to as the 'architectural cultivation of land.' One material that is seen often in the area is the yellow-grey stone, which was also used in the construction of the Acerra Cathedral. This stone is called Neapolitan Yellow Tuff Stone, or in Italian, Napoletano Tufo Giallo.

=== Cuisine ===
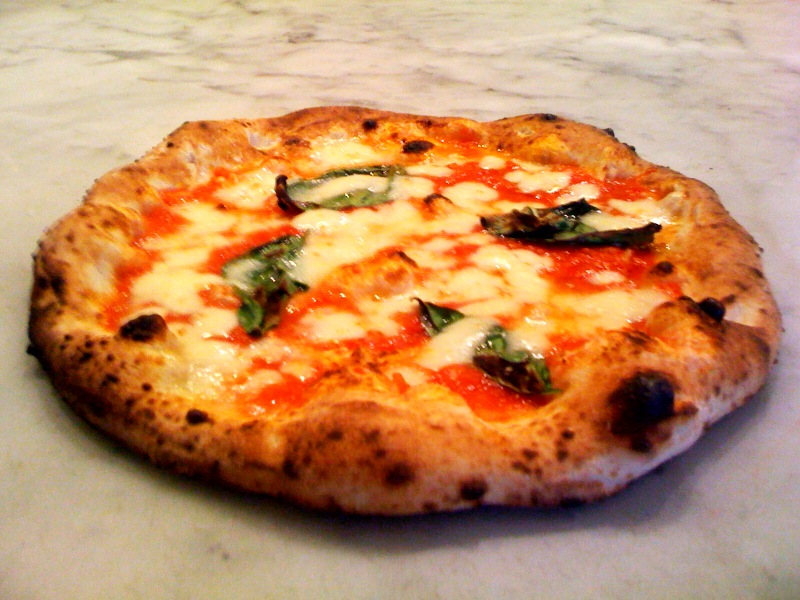
Neapolitan Pizza

Acerra is rich with flavors and homemade food. Afterall, the neighboring city of Naples is the birthplace of pizza. There are a massive variety of food, including baked, fried, and grilled goods in the streets of Naples. The Margherita pizza is especially consumed here because it was invented to represent the colors of the Italian flag, the red of the tomato, the green of the basil, and the white of the mozzarella cheese. Another item that is well known in the area is Neapolitan pizza, which is a closed pizza filled with ricotta cheese, tomatoes, mozzarella, and peppers. Other items that are easy to find are pasta, coffee, and caprese.

== Economy ==
Following the conclusion of World War II, Italy had one of the weakest economies in the world, however, now it is considered to be one of the most powerful. The largest industries that contribute to the strength of Italy's economy is chemicals, and textiles. After the second world war the reason that their economy was able to expand so exponentially was due to the fact that they were able to manufacture and export goods, due to their liberal trade policies. Another great asset Italy has contributing to its economy is tourism. Though this country's strong suit is not in the agricultural aspect of things, they are one of the leading countries in the world in regards to the production of olive oil. Other products that are also exported to other countries from Italy include rice, tomatoes, and wine. The economy does also have some weaknesses including the lack of raw materials they have access to, and the lack of energy sources, many of which they end up being forced to import.

== Transport ==
There are many ways to travel around Acerra, in order to get from one major attraction to another, the typical modes of transportation include taxi, foot, bus, metro, or car. When in the nearby city of Naples, many attractions are very close to one another, meaning travelling by foot is cheapest and recommended. In regards to a taxi, they are not the most cost efficient mode of transportation, as the cost increases the farther you travel. As for busses, they are notorious for their unreliability. The metro also has trains above, or below ground, and on the day to day is usually used by commuters, but it is good to travel longer distances for a cost effective price. Finally, cars, this type of transportation is not all too common among travelers due to the fact that it is necessary to get an international driving permit in order to operate a vehicle in Italy.
