= Garden waste dumping =

Discarding of garden waste at an inappropriate location

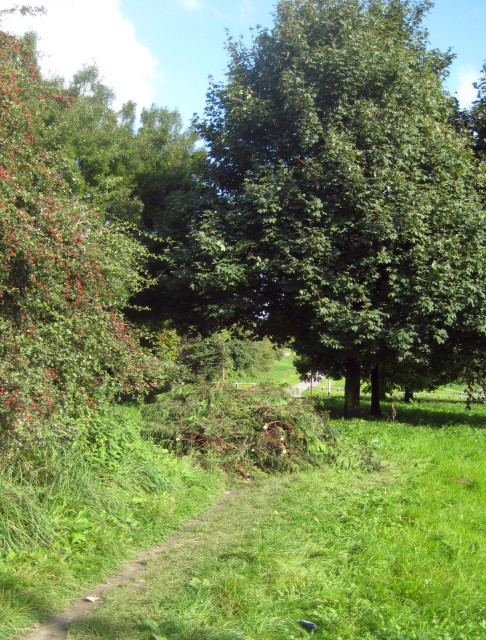
Dumped tree cuttings blocking a path

Garden waste, or green waste dumping is the act of discarding or depositing garden waste somewhere it does not belong.

Garden waste is the accumulated plant matter from gardening activities which involve cutting or removing vegetation, i.e. cutting the lawn, weed removal, hedge trimming or pruning consisting of lawn clippings. leaf matter, wood and soil.

The composition and volume of garden waste can vary from season to season and location to location. A study in Aarhus, Denmark, found that on average, garden waste generation per person ranged between 122 kg and 155 kg per year.

Garden waste may be used to create compost or mulch, which can be used as a soil conditioner, adding valuable nutrients and building humus. The creation of compost requires a balance between, nitrogen, carbon, moisture and oxygen. Without the ideal balance, plant matter may take a long time to break down, drawing nitrogen from other sources, reducing nitrogen availability to existing vegetation which requires it for growth.

The risk of dumping garden waste is that it may contain seeds and plant parts that may grow (propagules), as well as increase fire fuel loads, disrupt visual amenity, accrue economic costs associated with the removal of waste as well as costs associated with the mitigation of associated impacts such as weed control and forest fires.

== Cause ==
An Australian government publication suggests that some of the main reasons for the dumping of garden waste can be attributed to lack of care for the environment, convenience, or a reluctance to pay for the correct collection or disposal of the waste. (Environmental Protection Agency [EPA]. 2013). People dump garden waste to avoid disposal fees at landfill sites or because they do not want to spend the time or effort disposing of or recycling their waste properly. This activity is carried out by people in all parts of the community, from householders to businesses, such as professional landscapers and gardeners. The spread of exotic vegetation can out-compete locally endemic vegetation, altering the composition and structure of an ecosystem.

== Impact ==
Green and garden waste has a direct impact to the visual aesthetics of land and can often attract further illegal dumping.

=== Increased fire risk ===
Dumping garden waste in nature reserves and parks surrounding and near urban areas can affect the existing flora and fauna, as well as human life through the increased risk of fires. Dumped garden waste will eventually dry, creating additional fuel on which a fire can thrive and spread. Garden waste can spread weeds, which can also act as fuel for fires. Fires may also spread to residential areas where humans can also be impacted by losing their homes from fire, incur injury or death from smoke or burns, and suffer economic losses such as income loss and clean-up costs. Fires can lead to an overall loss of habitat and biodiversity.

=== Threat to biodiversity ===
Dumping of garden waste threatens biodiversity by facilitating the spread of exotic plant species into forest remnants via the introduction of seeds and propagules contained within the garden waste. Highly adaptive plants chosen by gardeners for their novelty, suitability to local environmental conditions and ease of cultivation out compete more specialised species. Non-native invaders can cause extinctions of vulnerable native species through competition, pest and disease transportation and habitat and ecosystem alteration.

The results of one North German study found that of the problematic population of Fallopia, app. 29% originated from garden waste. Of a population of Heracleum mantegazzianum, 18% was found by Schepker to be generated by garden waste (as cited by Kowarik & von der Lippe, 2008) pg 24–25.

=== Waterways quality ===
The dumping of green waste such as lawn clippings can block drainage systems. This pollutes water, and therefore affects water quality and the health of aquatic plants and animals. Dumped garden waste can add high levels of sediments, reducing the light available for photosynthesis. Dumping can also block waterways and roads, cause flooding and facilitate higher rates of erosion by smothering natural vegetation cover.

== Mitigation ==
Education on the value of biodiversity and the negative effects of weed invasion have been identified as key items in changing current trends. Specific education campaigns on the risks of dumping garden waste could be targeted at high-risk societal groups such as residents of housing in close proximity to reserves as well as members of gardening communities and plant sellers. Restricting the selection of garden species in new housing developments adjacent to reserves may reduce the effects of illegal dumping, thereby reducing requirement and associated cost of weed management. Creating habitat for wildlife by planting native plants, making a water source available, provide shelter and places to raise young. Healthy ecosystems are necessary for the survival and health of all organisms, and there are a number of ways to reduce negative impact on the environment. Cultivation of native plant species may benefit not only native plant populations but also native animal populations. For example, Sears & Anderson suggest that native bird species diversity in Australia and North America tend to match the volume and diversity of native vegetation. Crisp also explains the percentage of native insect species in a fauna has been found to be consistent with the percentage of native plant species.

Composting is a great way to recycle nutrients back into soils. Mulching the garden with leaves and clippings (BMCC, n.d). Fostering an appreciation of local natural environmental features and plant species may also help mitigate the issue. as well as the restriction of highly invasive plant species through international policy.

Utilization of green waste bins that are provided by some councils or shires that are emptied via curbside collection (BMCC. n.d). The addition of facilities for waste disposal could also improve the issue (DECC. 2008). Mitigation may involve governments holding campaigns that show people disposing legally and reporting the consequences for disposing illegally. A way Australian governments are addressing the problem is through the increase of fines in conjunction with better law enforcement. In Australia, fines can be up to $1,000,000 and can also incur imprisonment. The Protection of the Environment Operations Act imposes penalties for offences including polluting waters with waste, polluting land, illegally dumping waste or using land as an illegal waste facility.

=== Australia ===
The new section of the POEO Act (The Protection of the Environment Operations Act 1997) now imposes further penalties for offences including polluting waters with waste, polluting land, illegally dumping waste or using land as an illegal waste facility (Parrino, Maysaa, Kaoutarani & Salam, 2014). Communities are encouraged to report illegal dumping. In accordance with NSW Illegal Dumping Strategy 2014–16, hefty fines and a maximum jail sentence of 2 years can be handed down to repeat offenders.
