= Illegal dumping =

Act of dumping waste illegally

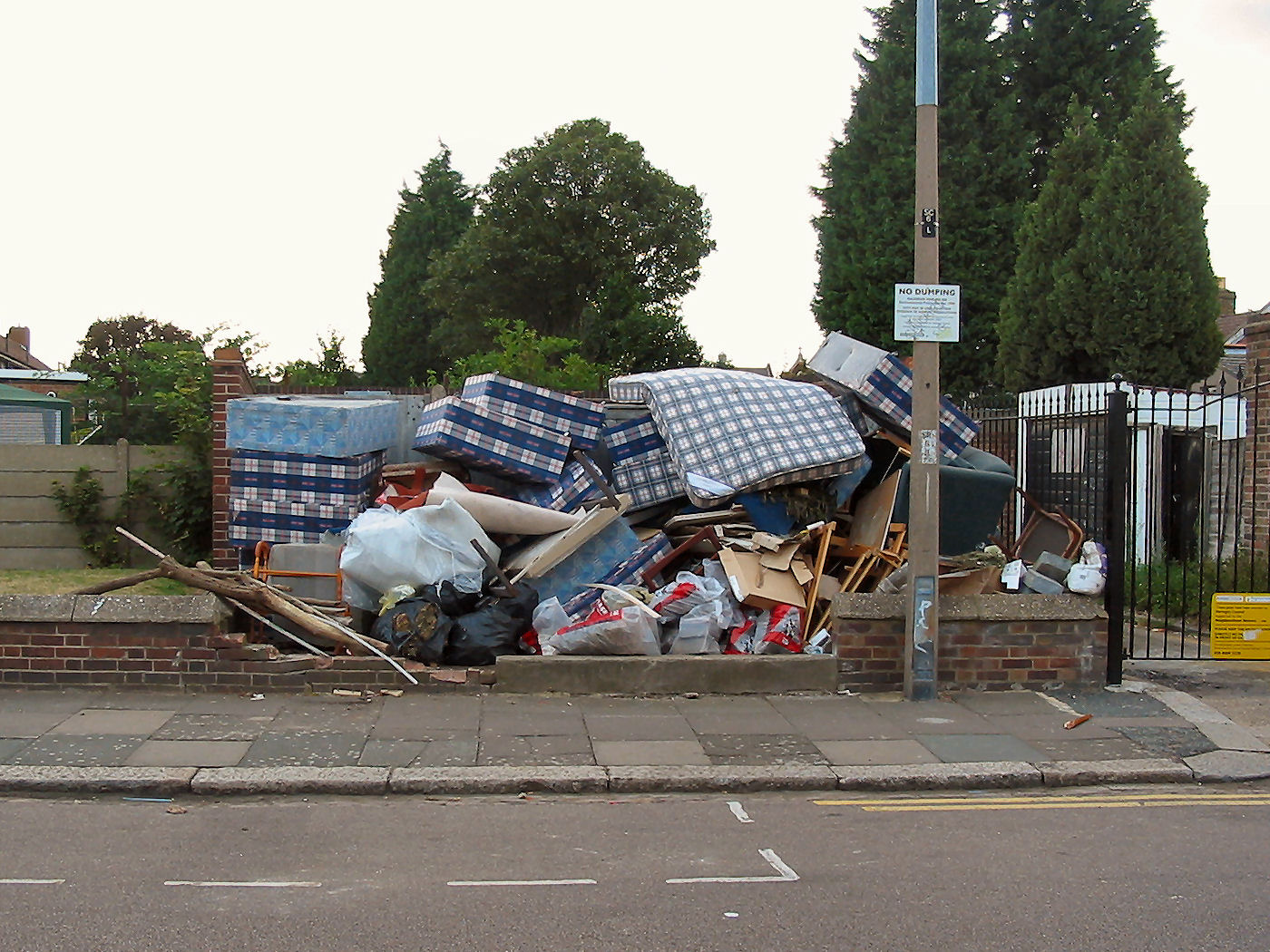
Illegal dumping at Scales Road, London, England

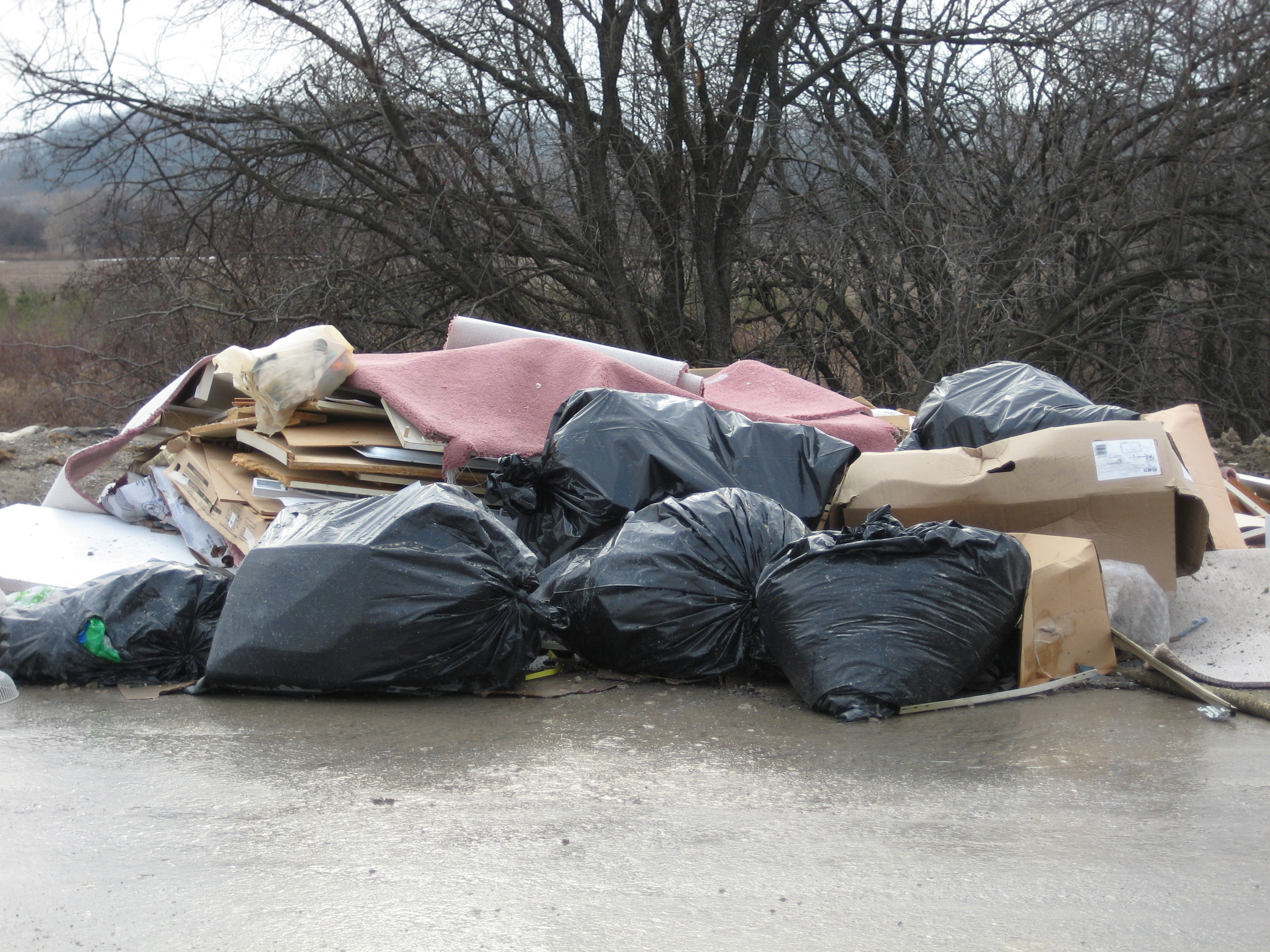
Illegal dumping in a residential subdivision, north of Toronto, Ontario, Canada

Illegal dumping, also called fly dumping or fly tipping (UK), is the dumping of waste illegally instead of using an authorised method such as kerbside collection or using an authorised rubbish dump. It is the illegal deposit of any waste onto land, including waste dumped or tipped on a site with no licence to accept waste.

== Terminology ==
Illegal dumping is typically distinguished from littering by the type and amount of material and/or the manner in which it is discarded. An example of littering could be throwing a drink container on the ground in a public area. However, emptying a trash bin or discarding a large item with no permission in a public or private area can be classified as illegal dumping or fly tipping. The term fly tipping is derived from the verb tip, meaning "to throw out of a vehicle", and on the fly, meaning done as one goes, or during another activity" – to throw away carelessly or casually.

== Types of materials dumped ==
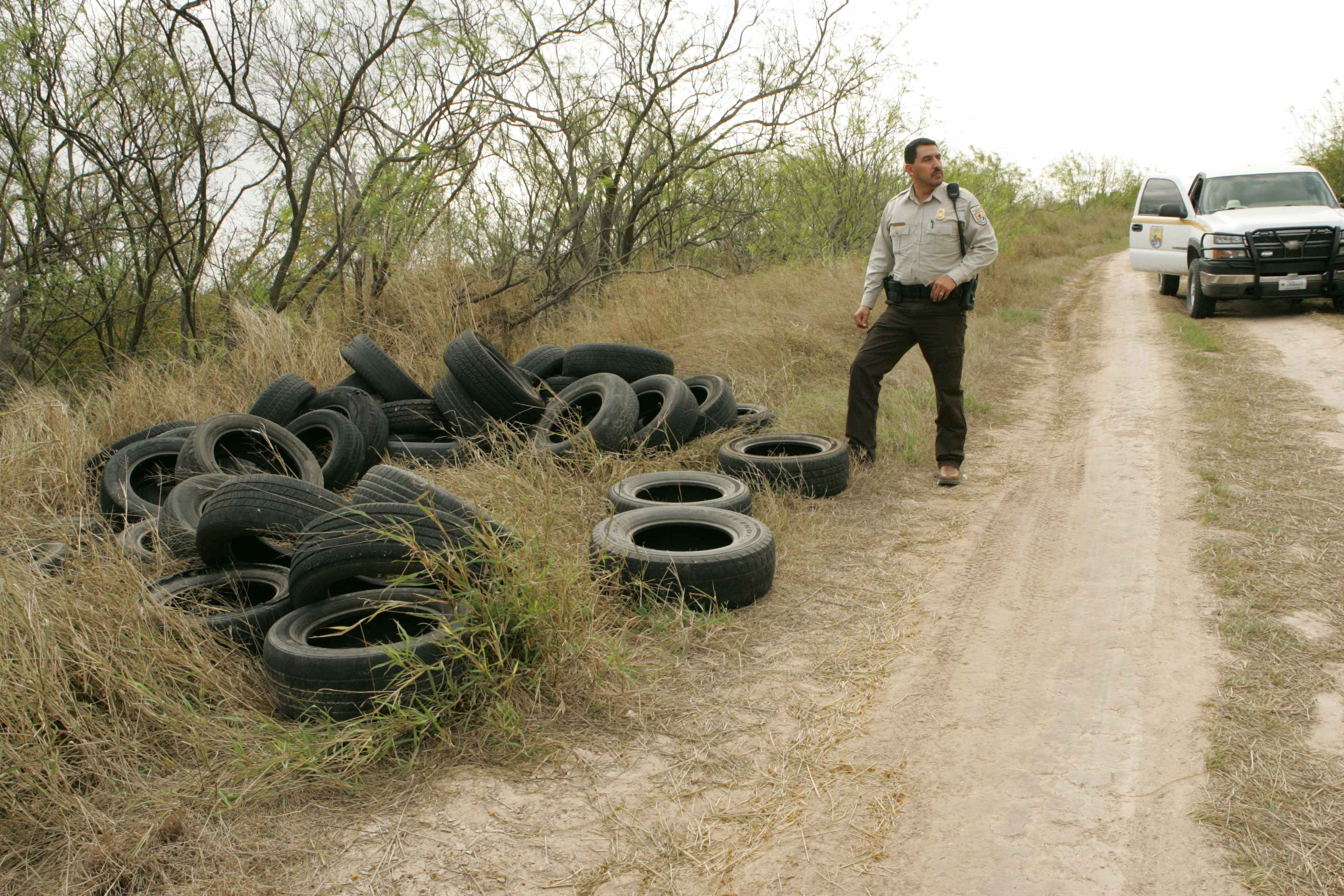
Illegally dumped tires on the side of the road

Illegal dumping involves the unauthorised disposal of numerous types of waste. Typical materials dumped include building materials from construction sites, such as drywall, roofing shingles, lumber, brick, concrete, and siding. Other frequently dumped materials include automobile parts, household appliances, household waste, furniture, yard scraps, and medical waste.

== Causes of illegal dumping ==
The reasons people dump illegally vary; however, research indicates that lack of legal waste disposal options is a primary factor. A shortage of legal disposal options drives demand for waste removal service, increasing prices. Studies also have found that unit pricing, which involves charging a set price per bag of garbage thrown out, contributes to illegal dumping. Although the intent of unit pricing is to encourage people to use other forms of waste disposal such as recycling and composting, people often turn to disposing of waste in unauthorised areas to save money. Additionally, weak enforcement of laws prohibiting illegal dumping and a lack of public awareness regarding the environmental, health, and economic dangers of illegal dumping contribute.

== Effects of illegal dumping ==
Effects of illegal dumping include health, environmental, and economic consequences. While legal waste disposal locations, such as landfills, are designed to contain waste and prevent byproducts infiltrating the surrounding environment, illegal dumping areas do not typically incorporate the same safeguards. Due to this, illegal dumping may sometimes lead to pollution of the surrounding environment. Toxins or hazardous materials infiltrating soil and drinking water threaten the health of local residents. Additionally, illegal dump sites that catch fire pollute the air with toxic particles. Environmental pollution due to illegal dumping can damage health. Short-term issues include asthma; congenital illnesses; stress and anxiety; headaches, dizziness and nausea; and eye and respiratory infections. Long-term concerns include cancer and kidney; liver; respiratory; cardiovascular; brain; nervous; and lymphohematopoietic diseases. Beyond negative health outcomes due to pollution and toxic waste, illegal dumps pose a physical threat. Unstable piles of material and exposed nails threaten harm to humans, specifically children who may be attracted to illegal dumps as play areas.

Illegal dumps also attract vermin and insects. Tires, a material frequently dumped because most municipalities ban their disposal in landfills, provide an ideal breeding ground for mosquitos due to stagnant water collected within.

Tires and electronic waste are combustible. Outbreaks of fire at illegal dump sites can lead to forest fires, causing erosion and destroying habitat.

Illegal dumping also negatively affects surrounding property values. Unattractive and odorous accumulations of waste discourage commercial and residential developers from improving communities. Additionally, existing residents may have difficulty “taking pride” in their neighborhoods.

In addition to decreasing property values and, therefore, tax revenue for governments, illegal dumping costs governments millions of dollars in clean up costs. In the United Kingdom, the Environmental Protection Agency spends £100–150 million annually to investigate and clean up illegal dump sites. The United States Environmental Protection Agency estimates several million in costs each year nationwide.

== Deterring illegal dumping ==
Efforts to combat illegal dumping vary in each situation as solutions are crafted with specific community dynamics in mind. However, common approaches include a combination of limiting access to illegal dumping sites, surveillance, enforcement, and increasing access to legal waste disposal opportunities. Listed below are common techniques employed by governing bodies:

=== Limit access ===
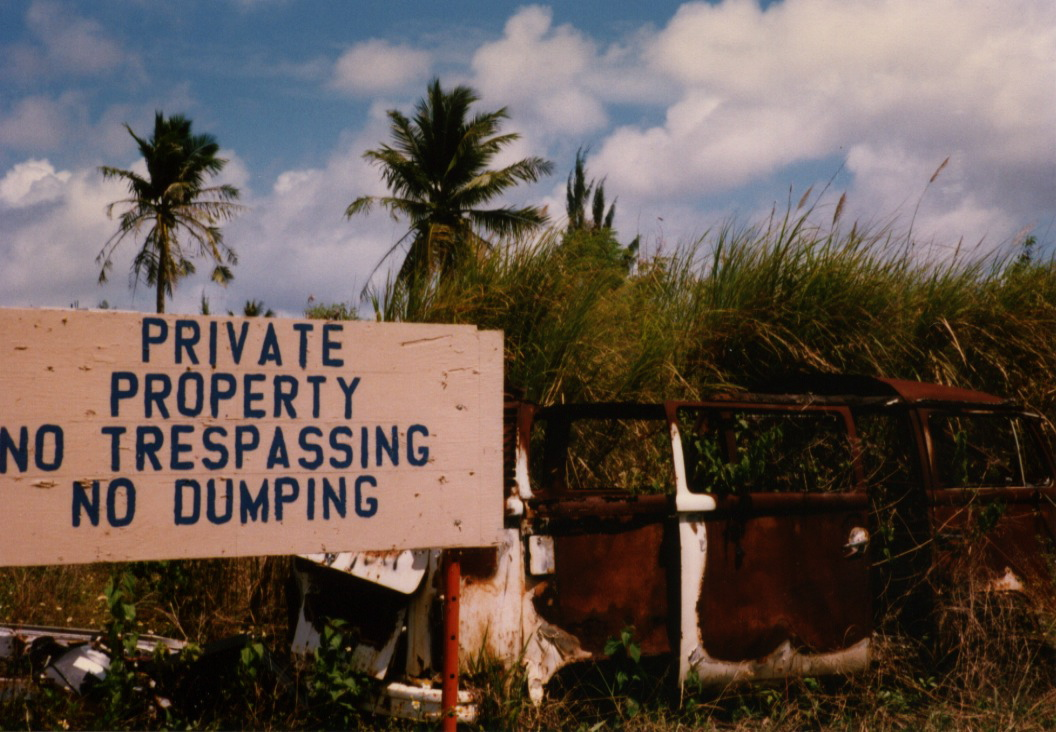
An attempt to limit access in Guam with a No Dumping and No Trespassing sign

Most violators dump waste at night because darkness helps them avoid detection. Consequently, lighting known or potential illegal dumping sites deters the practice. In Canada Bay, New South Wales, the city installed solar powered lights in dumping “hot spots”. Following installation of the lights, the city received fewer complaints regarding illegal dumping in those areas.

Other methods of limiting access include re-landscaping and beautifying illegal dump sites. Adding aesthetic amenities such as grass, flowers, and benches demonstrates that the site is well maintained, discouraging dumpers. Additionally, increasing community use of the area will adjust locals’ perception of the site from dumping ground to valued open space.

Adding barriers such as fencing, rocks, locked gates, and concrete blocks prevents offenders from accessing dump sites with their vehicles, completely deterring illegal dumping or reducing the volume of disposed materials. For example, Maitland, New South Wales erected fences around rural dumping sites prevented vehicles from gaining access. Continued monitoring 12 months later showed that 80% of dump sites protected by the fences experienced negligible illegal waste disposal activity.

=== Increase surveillance and enforcement ===
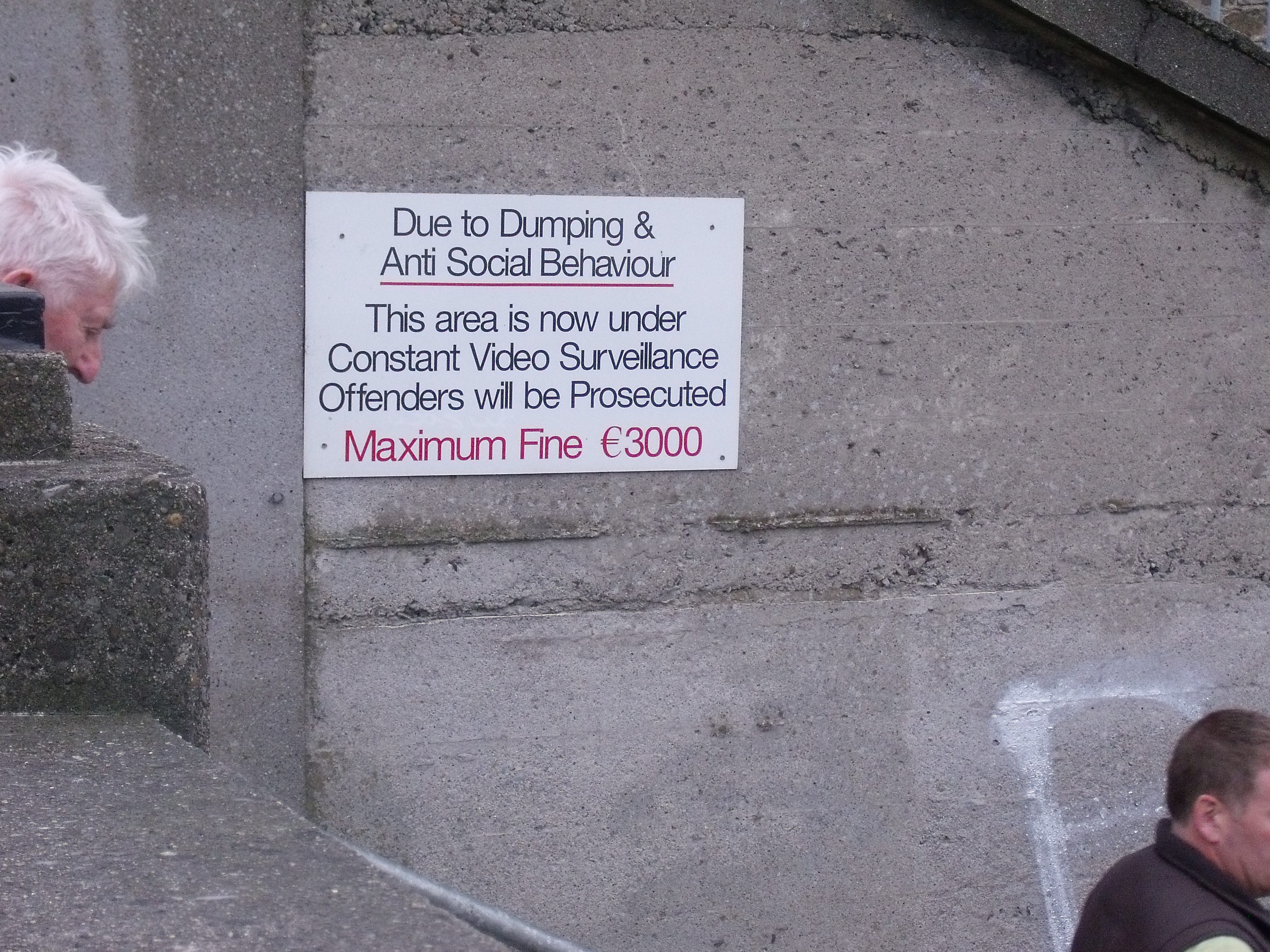
Sign in Ireland intended to deter illegal dumping, threatening a €3,000 fine

Increasing offenders’ risk of arrest is also a way to combat illegal dumping. The most common way to accomplish this is through surveillance measures, such as video cameras. Camera footage can help law enforcement officials identify dumpers while also collecting data on peak dumping periods. Installation of fake cameras has also been shown to be a deterrent. Police patrols, helicopter and plane surveillance, and community surveillance are also options for increasing risk. A police presence generally deters illegal activity, while US community surveillance depends upon residents reporting known illegal dumpers to law enforcement for a reward. The cities of Los Angeles, Sacramento, and Oakland all implement similar reporting schemes.

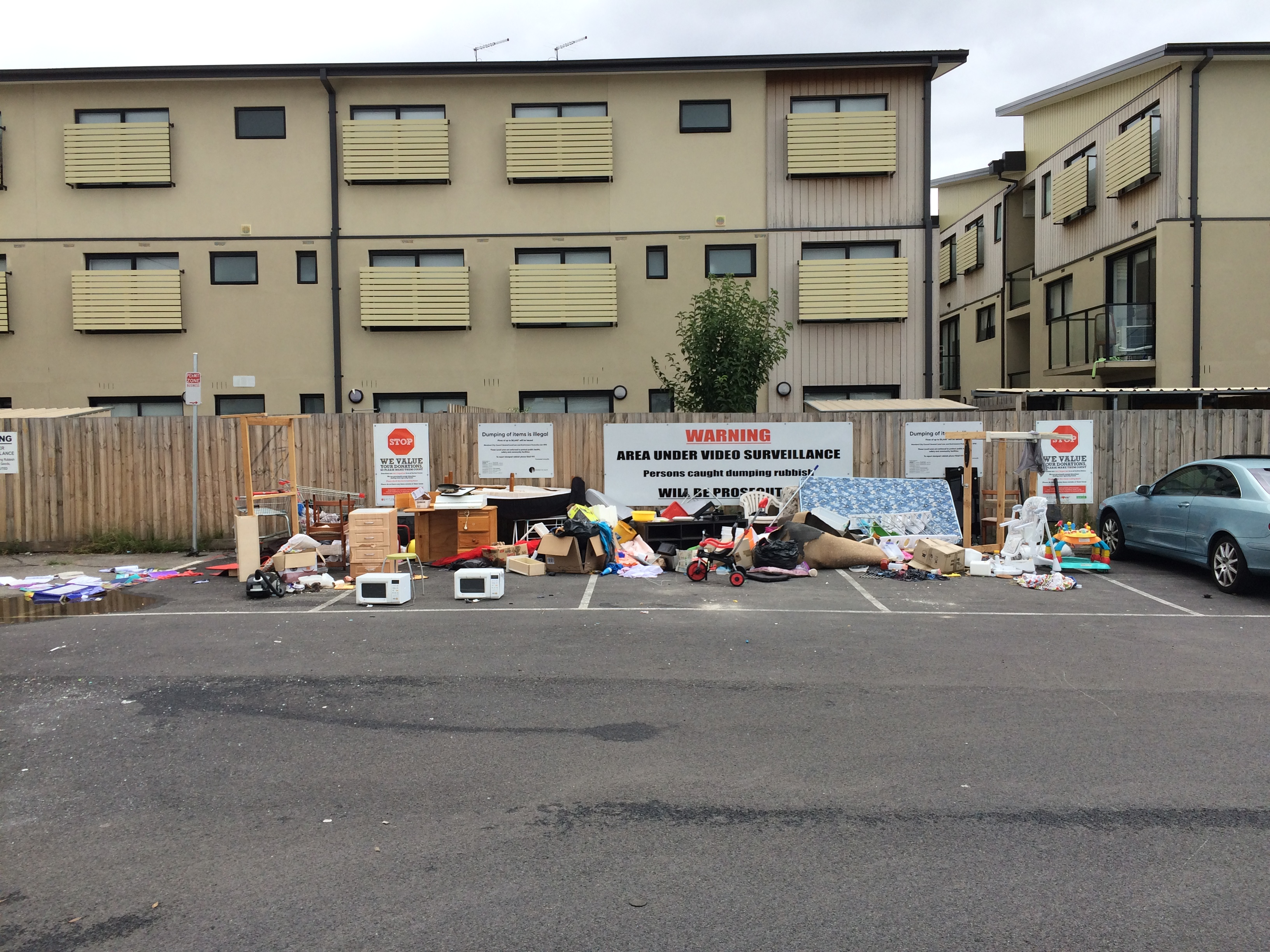
Anti-dumping signage in Glenroy, Victoria, Australia

Cities can implement periodic compliance campaigns, which involve randomly conducted “crackdowns” by law enforcement. Increased police patrols, anti-dumping signage posted in known illegal disposal sites, random inspections of property, and publicity regarding convicted illegal dumpers and the use surveillance can deter illegal dumping.

=== Provide alternatives ===
Removing illegal dumpers’ reasons for improperly disposing of waste is also an option for governing bodies. Offenders often dump to save money. Cities can offer free or subsidised waste services to residents to encourage legal disposal. If free or subsidised programs are not feasible due to funding limitations, cities must ensure affordability of waste disposal services. Offering alternative disposal options such as recycling and compost centres is also recommended. Fines or charges for clean-up costs can also act as a deterrent.

Combating illegal dumping also involves promoting legal waste disposal avenues. Offering kerbside collection and improving waste storage in high density residential areas provides residents with convenient waste disposal options. Communication of available services is important to the success of such programs. Offering similar accommodations for commercial and industrial waste generated by office buildings, restaurants, schools, and factories will also decrease instances of illegal dumping.

Cities can also deter illegal dumping by offering disposal options for materials and substances banned from landfills, such as tires, toxic and hazardous waste, and medical waste. The Massachusetts Department of Environmental Protection recommends chipping or shredding tires so that they can be recycled in other uses such as highways, playgrounds, and running tracks. The United States Environmental Protection Agency recommends disposing of household hazardous and toxic waste in the nearest community drop off location. For example, Boston, Massachusetts, holds drop-off days four times per year.

Similar rules apply to disposal of medical waste. In Boston, officials recommend storing syringes in a sharps container and disposing in a designated community site. The city also recommends utilizing mail back services to dispose of used syringes.

=== Education ===
City governments can implement education campaigns to further mitigate illegal dumping. For example, cities can inform residents and businesses of legal waste disposal avenues through mailed flyers, newspaper and radio announcements, and posters. Posting signs near known illegal dumping sites can also help deter offenders.

=== Cleaning up existing dumps ===
According to the United States Environmental Protection Agency, waste attracts more waste. Therefore, cleaning up existing illegal dumps is a helpful deterrent for additional illegal dumping. The United States Environmental Protection Agency instituted a program to cap open dumps in tribal communities. 1,100 of these dumps exist in the United States and pose health and environmental risks to the surrounding communities. The open dumps are closed off with a clay liner and soil depth accounting for infiltration and erosion. "Native dryland grass" is planted on top of the newly covered dump to prevent erosion and water monitoring wells are installed nearby.

== Illegal dumping in Campania, Italy ==
The triangle of death in Campania, Italy, is Europe's largest illegal waste dump. The area, which encompasses Italian municipalities Acerra, Marigliano, and Nola, experiences illegal waste disposal practices by the Camorra such as unauthorised burying of toxic waste under places frequented by humans. Frequent fires at dumping sites and illegal waste fires set by residents have resulted in contamination of the air and drinking water. Additionally, the land has deteriorated due to the illegal waste.

The environmental pollution caused by the illegal dumping has resulted in elevated instances of cancer and cancer mortality in the region. In 2014 and 2015, the Italian government funded health screenings to track the rise in illnesses in Campania. Studies conducted using the data collected from these screenings found elevated instances of leukemia, lymphoma, and colorectal and liver cancer mortality in one of Campania's districts. The study attributed this increase in cancer and cancer mortality with toxic exposures from the illegal waste.

== Electronic waste in China ==
Illegal dumping of electronic waste, or e-waste, presents environmental and health concerns in China. The informal e-waste sector recycles the majority of e-waste in China, which is supplied through consumption, importation, and production. Foreign governments often send e-waste to China as the informal sector offers cheaper recycling services. China is not only the “largest e-waste dumping site”, it also generates large amounts of e-waste. In 2006, China produced 1.3 kg of e-waste per capita.

The informal e-waste sector lacks formal government oversight and pays its workers low wages while using recycling practices that expose both workers and the environment to toxic materials. Toxic substances are found in leachates, particulate matter, ashes, fumes, wastewater, and effluents generated during dumping, dismantling, and burning throughout the recycling process. Particles emitted are carried through the air and deposited nearby recycling centres and in surrounding areas. Leachates and wastewater infiltrate the soil, drinking water, livestock, and fish, exposing humans to toxic substances.

In recent years, China has begun to address the informal e-waste sector. At the governmental level, improvements have been made to waste management practices through adoption of Western management schemes such as those found in Japan, the United States, and the European Union. Additionally, the Chinese government has invested in improved e-waste collection and processing. Locally, various Chinese cities have constructed “recycling industrial parks” where e-waste can be processed efficiently and without harm to the environment. Regulations on e-waste have been implemented in the Chinese regions of Beijing, Shanghai, Jiangsu province, Zhejiang province and Guangdong province.

Corporations such as Nokia and Lenovo instituted free return services for Chinese customers who wish to dispose of old electronic products from the two companies.

== United Kingdom ==
Rubbish disposal in the UK is heavily regulated, with most households having on average one 240 litre bin for recyclable waste and one similar bin of non recyclable waste every week; some areas have additional similar or smaller bins for garden, food, or specific recycling waste. Any large rubbish, e.g., old furniture and mattresses, may need to be taken to the local waste depot by the home owner at their own expense, although many councils will collect certain items for free or for a small fee. This leads to some people simply leaving their waste in open public spaces or untended public gardens. This is called fly tipping. In addition, commercial or industrial users may fly-tip to avoid waste handling charges, as will unofficial and unlicensed waste disposal firms.

Taxes on landfill in the UK have led to illegal waste dumping. Common fly-tipped waste includes green waste, furniture, white goods and construction waste. As the cost of disposing of household rubbish and waste increases, so does the number of individuals and businesses that fly-tip, and the UK government has made it easier for members of the public to report fly-tipping.

Fly-tipping is a criminal offence, as per the Environmental Protection Act 1990. The fine or punishment is normally defined by the local council that operates in the local area in which the rubbish was dumped. However, it is possible to receive a custodial sentence for fly-tipping. According to the BBC, fly-tipping costs councils in England and Wales more than £50m annually (2016).

In the summer of 2025, a waste dump appeared in Oxfordshire, and later that year, it had grown to 150 metres long, and 6 metres high. In April of 2026, a mass cleanup of the site began, which was finished in August 2026. Six people have been arrested in accordance with the crimes.

== United States ==
The United States Environmental Protection Agency developed a “profile” of the typical illegal dumper. Characteristics of offenders include local residents, construction and landscaping contractors, waste removers, scrap yard operators, and automobile and tire repair shops.

== Open dumping ==
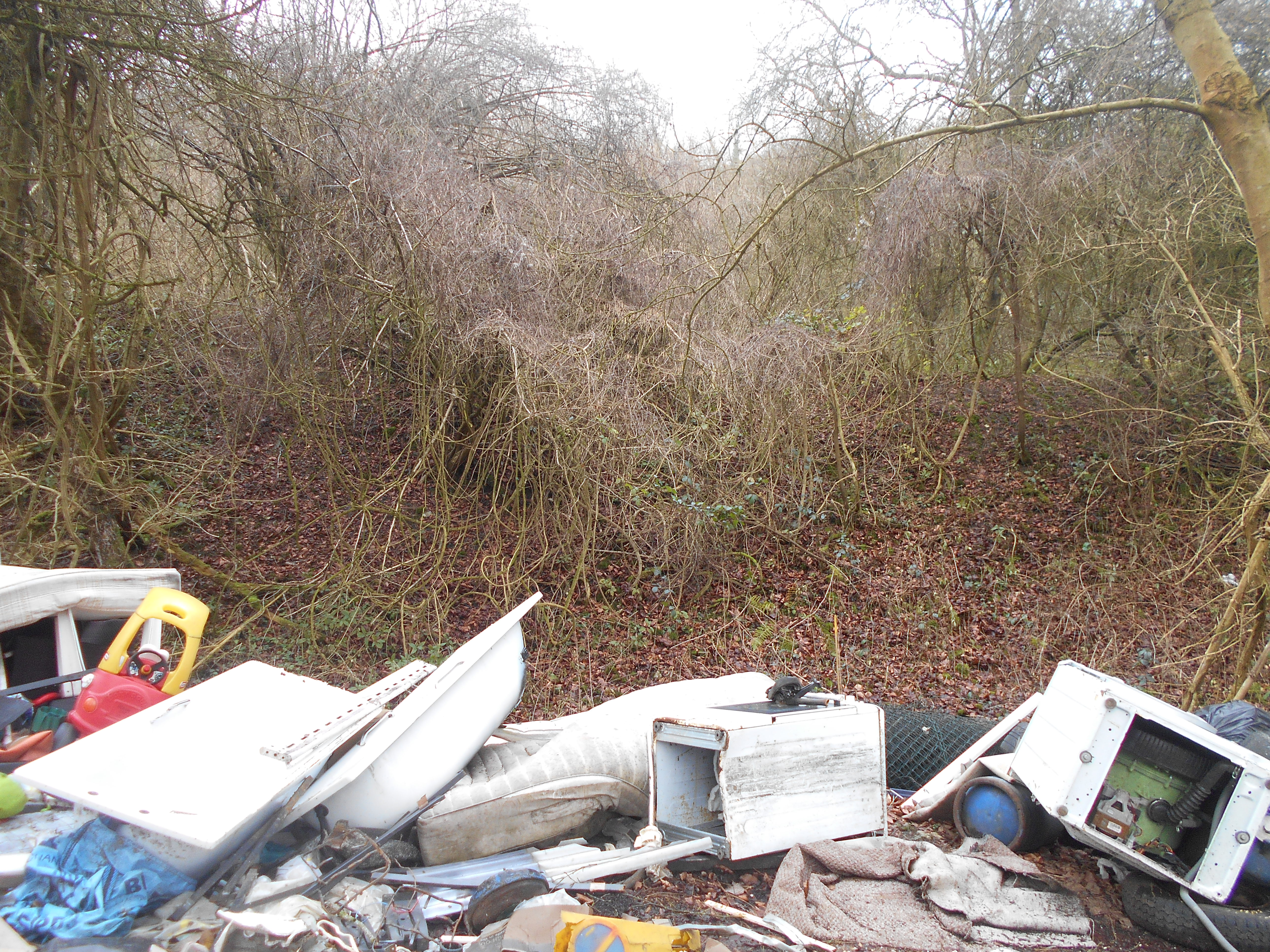
Open dump by a rural lane in Tatsfield, Surrey, England

Open dumps are locations where illegally dumped, abandoned piles of waste and debris are left in noticeable quantities. Fines are a common punishment for a person caught dumping at an open dump. Open dumps are commonly found in forests, backyards and abandoned buildings. Open dumps are sometimes removed shortly after they are created, but most will persist for an indefinite period of time when the site is situated in the wilderness or in public space without adequate public services.

... a multi-family dumpsite of any size or content. Open dumping is illegal under the Resource Conservation and Recovery Act (RCRA). The hazards of open dumping can include the release of toxics and heavy metals to the air and water; the increased presence of disease vectors such as rodents and insects; and physical hazards such as hypodermic needles, poisonous gases, and/or piercing objects.

— United States Environmental Protection Agency

== See also ==
- Garden waste dumping
- Litter
- Road debris
- Toxic waste dumping by the 'Ndrangheta
- Triangle of death (Italy)
- Urban runoff
