= Marigliano =

- Comune
- Comune di Marigliano
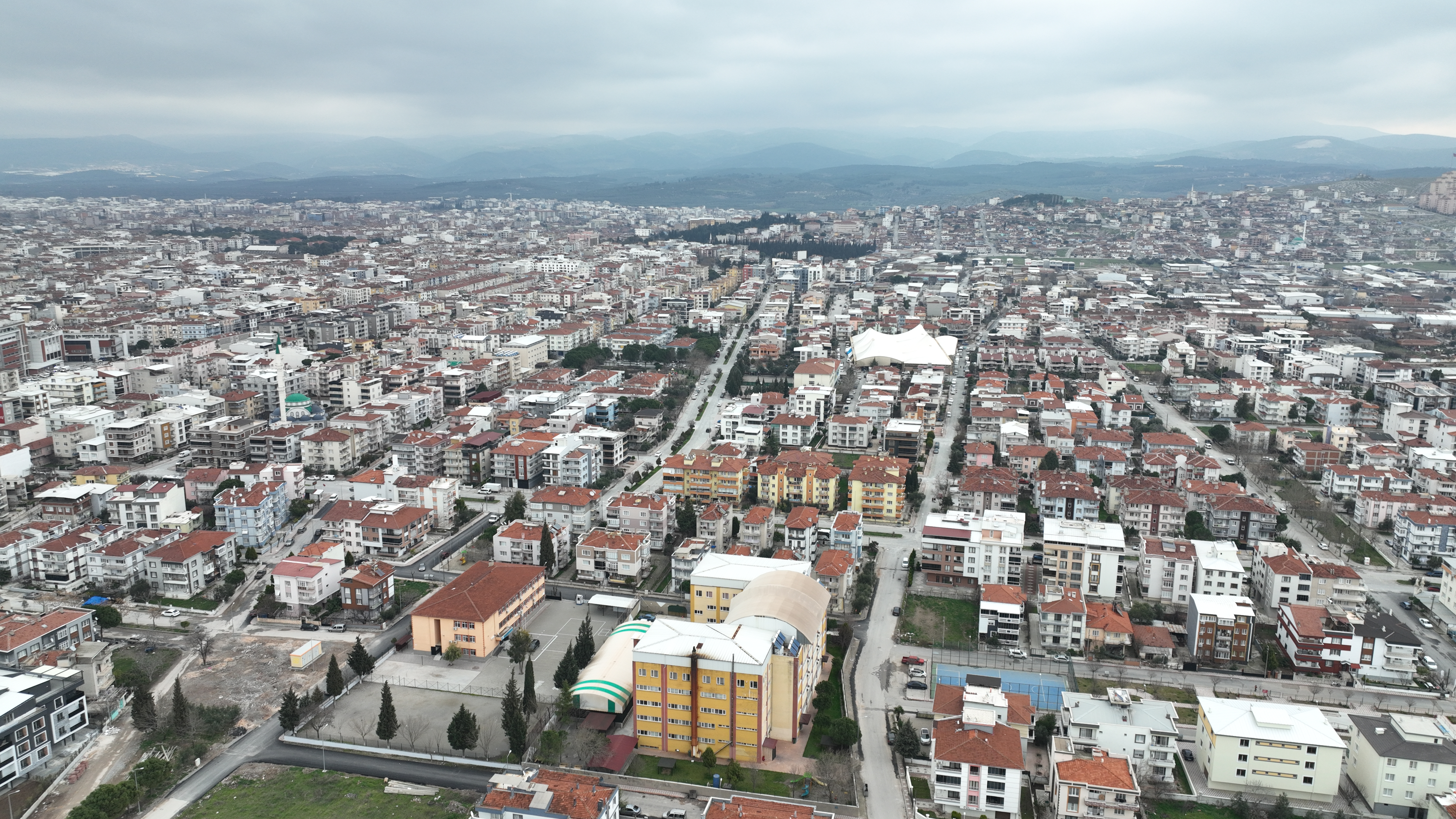
- Santuario della Madonna della Speranza

- Coat of arms

- Location within Italy Location within Campania
- Coordinates: 40°56′N 14°27′E
- Country: Italy
- Region: Campania
- Metropolitan city: Naples (NA)
- Frazioni: Lausdomini, Casaferro, Miuli, Faibano, Pontecitra, San Nicola

Government
  - Mayor: Vincenzo Galdi

Area
  - Total: 22.58 km^{2} (8.72 sq mi)
- Elevation: 30 m (98 ft)

Population (30 September 2017)
  - Total: 29,915
  - Density: 1,325/km^{2} (3,431/sq mi)
- Demonym: Mariglianesi
- Time zone: UTC+1 (CET)
  - Summer (DST): UTC+2 (CEST)
- Postal code: 80034
- Dialing code: 081
- Patron saint: Saint Sebastian
- Saint day: 20 January
- Website: Official website

Marigliano is a town and comune of the Metropolitan City of Naples, Campania, southern Italy.

The town lies 19 km from Naples. Nearby towns include: Acerra, Brusciano, Mariglianella, Nola, San Vitaliano, Scisciano, Somma Vesuviana.

== Main sights ==
- Church of Santa Maria delle Grazie, built around 1000. It was enlarged in the early 18th century by Domenico Antonio Vaccaro. The tuff bell tower, standing at c. 40.3 m, is from 1494. The upper small cupola, covered by yellow maiolica, was destroyed in the 1980 Irpinia earthquake, but has been rebuilt in the same shape but with different materials.
- Ducal Castle, known from the 12th century. Of the medieval edifice, the square plan with the angular towers remain.
- Church of the Annunziata with a late-Gothic apse. It houses a polychrome wooden polyptych in the high altar, in turn including a late 15th-century triptych
- Monastery of St. Vitus

== Organised crime ==
In October 2000, the Italian Parliament approved the findings of a commission which studied Camorra activities in Campania. According to this source, Marigliano is firmly under the control of the Camorra, in particular the group led by Antonio Capasso. This group took advantage of the efforts of law enforcement that eliminated its main enemy, a Camorra group led by the Mazzarella family that was located in Ponte Citra, a district of Marigliano.

Marigliano is a suburb of Naples. In the 1990s to the 2000s, a waste management crisis broke out in the city as a result of illegal dumping by the Camorra. Majority of the waste was dumped in the region between Marigliano, Acerra, and Nola, referred to as the "Triangle of Death". A 2004 study by Alfredo Mazza published in The Lancet Oncology revealed that deaths by cancer in the area are much higher than the European average.

== Twin towns ==
- (United States) Madison, New Jersey, USA, since 2006
