= Ecomafia =

Italian neologism

Ecomafia is an Italian neologism for criminal activities related to organized crime which cause damage to the environment. The term was coined by the Italian environmentalist organization Legambiente in 1994 and has since seen widespread use. In Italy, environmental crime is one of the fastest-growing and most profitable forms of criminal activity. As of 2012, an estimated 30% of Italy's waste is disposed of illegally by organized crime syndicates. The United Nations Environment Programme estimated that criminal organizations earned approximately $20–30 billion USD from environmental crimes. According to a 2024 report by Legambiente, the entire illegal waste disposal market in Italy was worth €8.8 billion in 2023 and was dominated by more than 300 mafia clans.

== Activities ==
The primary activities in which the ecomafia is involved are the illegal trafficking and disposal of waste, illegal construction, and the trafficking of exotic animals and stolen art. The Italian ecomafia is closely connected.

In Italy, the term ecomafia is generally used to describe criminal syndicates which traffic and illegally dispose of industrial, commercial, and radioactive waste. Mafia-related organizations frequently illegally bury waste in southern Italy and build real estate on top of the dumps. Between 2008 and 2010, an estimated 17,000 houses were built on illegal waste dumps.

The 'Ndrangheta and Camorra syndicates are frequently implicated in environmental crimes, particularly the illegal disposal of hazardous waste. In the 21st century, the criminal organizations in Italy have allied with the Chinese mafia, and cooperated with them on enterprises related to environmental crime. Although public perception in Italy attributes most environmental crimes to criminal organizations, corporations in Italy commit environmental crimes more frequently than criminal organizations with mafia ties. Waste disposal is also used as a cover by criminal organizations to conceal the trafficking of drugs, human trafficking, and other illicit activities.

== Impact ==
The unsafe disposal of waste in lakes and grazing land around the Caserta region of Italy has contributed to rising levels of toxins in the dairy and agricultural produce of the region, which forced Italian authorities to declare certain regions off-limits for grazing.

== Police operations ==
In response to the emergence of widespread environmental crimes, the Carabinieri, a police branch of Italy's military, has created a separate branch which specializes in environmental crime. In 2015, environmental police discovered a dump containing industrial waste, medical waste, asbestos, and building materials behind a house in Casal di Principe connected to the Camorra organized crime syndicate. The region of Caserta, where the dump was found, has been associated with the ecomafia since the 1980s when illegal dumping began. The region became known as the "Land of pyres" (terra dei fuochi) because of the common criminal practice of burning toxic waste to dispose of it.

== See also ==
- Naples waste management crisis
- Triangle of death (Italy)
- Toxic colonialism
- Toxic waste dumping by the 'Ndrangheta
