= Brown waste =

Type of biodegradable waste

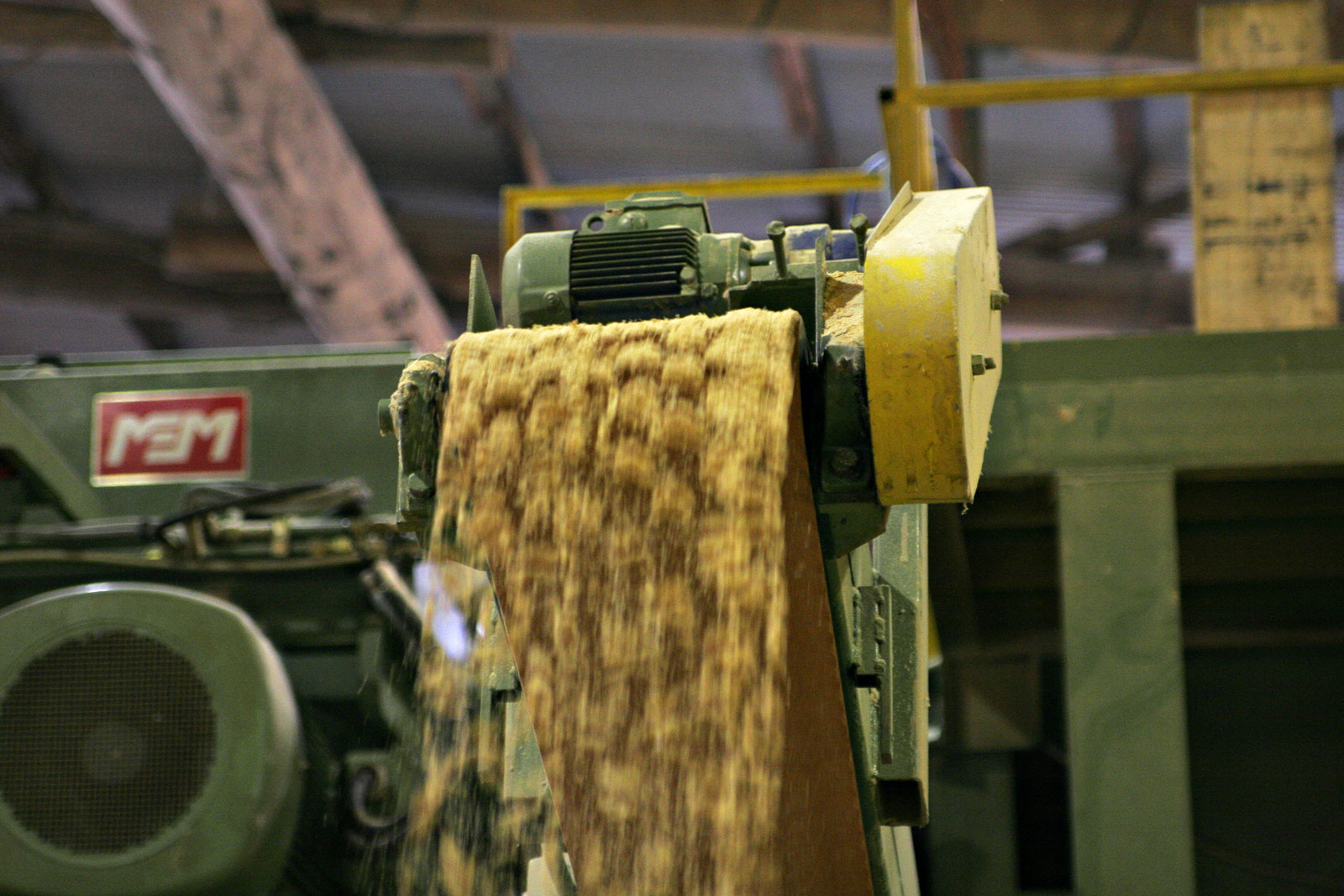
Sawdust is an example of brown waste.

Brown waste is any biodegradable waste that is predominantly carbon based. The term includes such items as grass cuttings, dry leaves, twigs, hay, paper, sawdust, corn cobs, used livestock bedding, manure, animal waste, cardboard, pine needles or cones, etc. Carbon is necessary for composting, which uses a combination of green waste and brown waste to promote the microbial processes involved in the decomposition process. The composting of brown waste sustainably returns the carbon to the carbon cycle.

Brown waste is considered the most environmentally friendly way to dispose of it in the ecosystem. Some companies use this waste to make artificial wood, and other products used for non-food grade materials.

== See also ==
- Biomass
- Waste management
- Composting
