= Green waste =

Biodegradable waste

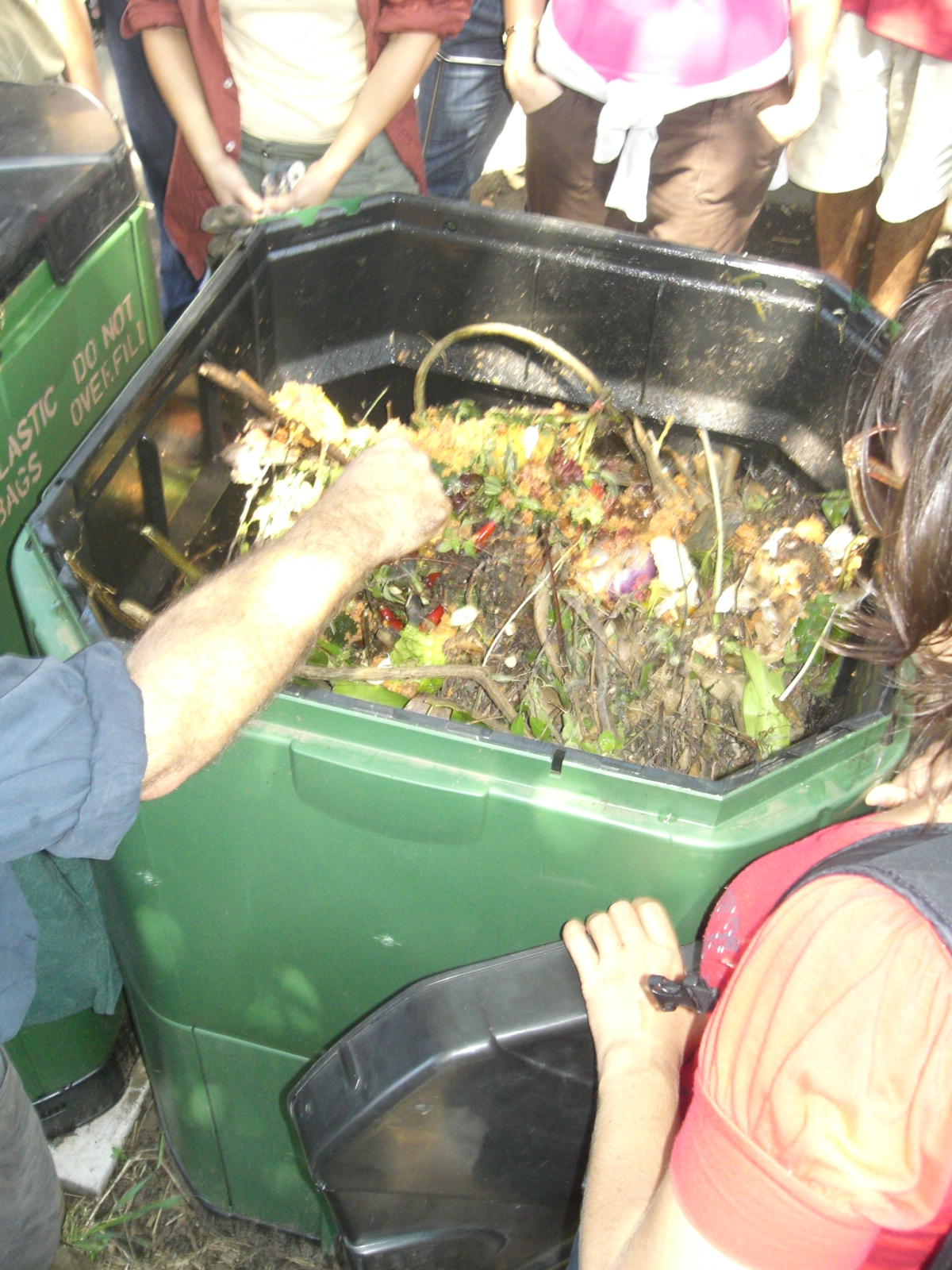
A bin filled with materials that comprise green waste, such as kitchen wastes and plant trimmings

Green waste, also known as biological waste or yard waste, is any organic waste that can be composted. It is most usually composed of refuse from gardens such as grass clippings or leaves, and domestic or industrial kitchen wastes. Green waste does not include things such as dried leaves, pine straw, or hay. Such materials are rich in carbon and considered "brown wastes," while green wastes contain high concentrations of nitrogen. Green waste can be used to increase the efficiency of many composting operations and can be added to soil to sustain local nutrient cycling.

== Collection of green waste ==
Green waste can be collected via municipal curbside collection schemes or through private waste management businesses. Many communities, especially in the United Kingdom, have initiated green waste recycling and collection programs in order to decrease the amount of biodegradable materials in landfills. Communities are provided with, or can provide their own, compost receptacles that they fill with plant and food remains, which are then emptied on a regular basis. Programs such as this allow communities to be an active part of composting their green waste which allows them to play an active role in decreasing the amount of food being dumped into local and regional landfills.

A variety of apps are now available to guide individuals and businesses in recycling efforts. These apps can help locate recycling centers, inform about recyclable materials in local areas, and facilitate the donation or exchange of unwanted items.

=== Pello System ===
A technology that monitors the fill level of trash cans, provides real-time information on the dumpsters' contents and location, identifies contamination, and sends pickup alerts. This system aims to streamline waste management and reduce unnecessary garbage truck dispatches, thereby lowering greenhouse gas emissions and traffic congestion.

=== Pneumatic Waste Pipes ===
Installed below public waste containers, these pipes transport waste directly to processing centers, reducing the need for traditional trash pickup. This system decreases the number of garbage trucks on roads, minimizing emissions and potential environmental health hazards from overflowing dumpsters.

== Uses ==
Green waste can be used to improve the quality and sustainability of industrially manufactured topsoils and the sanitariness and efficiency of sewage disposal. Green wastes like agricultural wastes can also be converted to human edible foods by making leaf protein concentrate.

=== Manufactured topsoils ===
Green waste is an integral part of many manufactured topsoils, as it provides both nutrients for growing plants and increases the volume of manufactured topsoils. Its woody components do not decompose quickly, so they provide the bulk that is necessary for supplementary topsoils. Mixing industrial wastes such as fly ash or coal dust with green waste to create artificial topsoil not only facilitates the repurposing of industrial debris and keeps it out of landfills, but it also allows the nutrients in green waste materials to be cycled back into the environment. By utilizing fly ash in conjunction with green waste, manufactured soils are able to increase their water holding capacity while simultaneously recycling refuse materials that might otherwise take up space in a landfill. This allows fly ash and green waste to increase local soil nutrient levels and promotes natural nutrient cycling processes.

=== Sewage disposal ===
Green waste can also be mixed with sewage wastes and composted, providing a safe, environmentally sustainable option for sewage disposal. Co-composting green and sewage wastes eliminates the risk that pathogens and pollutants contained in sewage wastes might pose to the environment. Utilization of green waste to dispose of sewage wastes not only decreases the amount of sewage incinerated and dumped each year, it also facilitates the cycling of organic wastes back into the environment. The co-composted remains of these organic wastes can be safely employed for use in agriculture. This process decreases the amount of trash being dumped into landfills and other trash repositories and allows for the complete cycling of organic nutrients through the environment.

=== Renewable energy ===
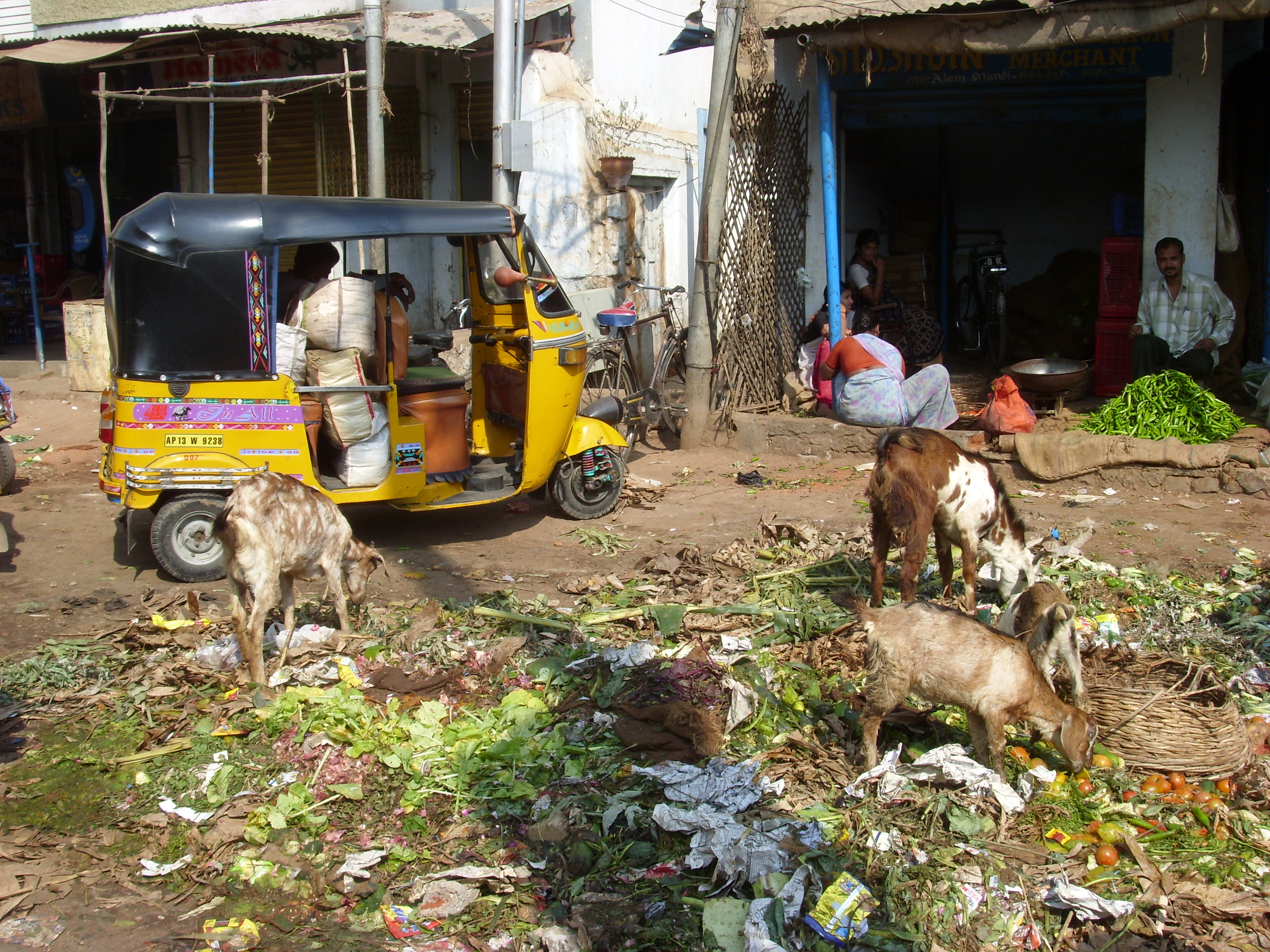
Vegetable waste being dumped in a market in Hyderabad, India

Biogas captured from biodegradable green waste can be used as biofuel. Green waste can be composed of non-food crops, which decompose to produce cellulosic ethanol. It can also help reduce the necessity of petroleum gases, which produce large amounts of greenhouse gases, such as carbon dioxide, when burned.

=== Soil health ===
Green waste composting has also been linked to suppression of soil borne diseases such as damping off and root rots that affect large agricultural and horticultural ventures like greenhouses and large-scale farms. This disease suppressive quality has positive implications for lesser-developed nations that do not have the technology or resources to purchase expensive fertilizers.

Addition of composts that contain residues and particles of heavy metals to soil can raise the soil's heavy metal content and increase the probability of these metals to transfer into crop plants. When biological, or green waste is added to these soil samples, plant uptake of heavy metal has been shown to decrease crop uptake of metals compared to other types of compost composed of things such as sewage sludge. This can protect consumers and the environment from biomagnification caused by long-term accumulation of heavy metal particles within the soil and plant life of an area.

== See also ==
- Garden waste dumping
- Biomass
- Biomass to liquid
- Biomass heating system
- Informal waste collection
