= Guido Bertolaso =

Italian official

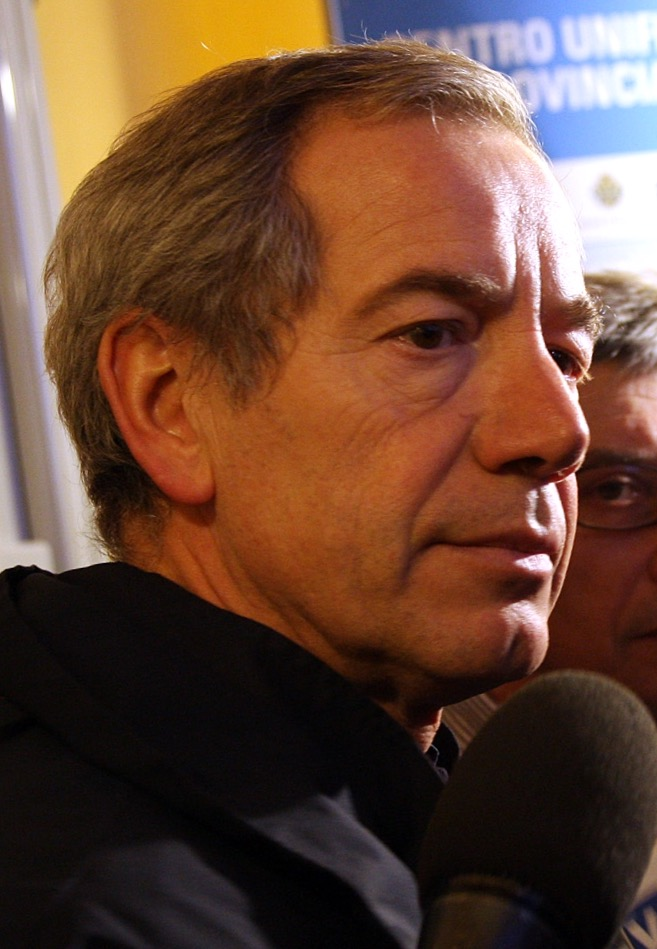
- Guido Bertolaso in 2009

Assessor of Welfare of Lombardy
- Incumbent
- Assumed office 2 November 2022
- President: Attilio Fontana
- Preceded by: Letizia Moratti

Head of the Civil Protection
- In office 7 September 2001 – 11 November 2010
- Preceded by: Franco Gabrielli
- Succeeded by: Franco Barberi
- In office 19 June 1996 – 16 July 1997
- Preceded by: Ferdinando Facchiano
- Succeeded by: Franco Barberi

Personal details
- Born: 20 March 1950 (age 75) Rome, Italy
- Spouse: Gloria Piermarini
- Children: 2
- Occupation: Physician

Guido Bertolaso (born March 20, 1950, Rome, Italy) is an Italian physician and state functionary, and from 2001 to 2010 was commander in chief of the Italian Civil Protection department.

== Biography ==
From May 2008 he was Secretary to the Prime Minister with responsibility to the waste crisis in Campania in the fourth Berlusconi government. He also held the post of Special Commissioner for the following emergencies: 2009 L'Aquila earthquake, volcanoes in the Aeolian Islands, maritime areas of Lampedusa, cleaning up the wreckage of the Haven tanker than sank in 1991, bionucleare risk, Cycling World Championships in Varese of 2008, the Presidency of the G8 summit in L'Aquila, and the Roman archaeological site.

He has a degree in medicine, which he received from the University of Rome La Sapienza and subsequently obtained a Master of Science in Public Health at the Liverpool School of Tropical Medicine. He worked with UNICEF for the health of children in tropical countries.

In February 2016 he was selected to be mayoral candidate for the right wing, Lega Nord, Fratelli d'Italia & Forza Italia in Rome for the upcoming town and city elections. The more extreme right, Lega Nord, Fratelli d'Italia & more to the right people in Forza Italia such as Alessandra Mussolini had some problem with him that resulted in the Fratelli d'Italia leader Giorgia Meloni running for mayor and being endorsed by Lega Nord. Finally Bertolaso withdrew from the race and Berlusconi endorsed Marchini. Surveys were showing a support rate of about 20% putting him a few percentages behind both the Democratic and the Five Stars candidates. The Five Star Movement candidate Virginia Raggi remained the frontrunner and was elected the first woman mayor of Rome.

== Honour ==
- Italy: Knight Grand Cross of the Order of Merit of the Italian Republic (2 june 2005)
