= Ecoblock =

Ecoblock or Eco-block can refer to:

- Compressed earth block, a building material sometimes called "Ecoblock" when mixed with cement
- Eco-Block, a type of paving stone
- Ecology block, a large recycled concrete block

== See also ==
- Eco-Brick (disambiguation)
