= Eco-Brick =

Ecobrick or Eco-brick may refer to:

- Eco-Brick, a brand name concentrated fireplace fuel source made from pressed sawdust, see Firelog
- Ecobricks (sometimes known as "Eco-bricks" or "bottle bricks"), plastic bottles stuffed solid with non-biological waste to create reusable building blocks.

== See also ==
- Ecoblock (disambiguation)
