= Eco-Block =

Type of brick

An Eco-Block is an environmental-friendly brick made from recycled materials and construction waste. The brick was invented by the Hong Kong Polytechnic University in 2006. Its major feature is to catalyze the nitrogen oxide and other pollutants in air into non-hazardous substances. Eco-Blocks have been mainly used as paving brick in pedestrians and vehicular areas in Hong Kong and are now in their third generation.

== Manufacturing ==
=== Material ===
The major constituents of the Eco-Block are recycled glass and recycled aggregate from construction and demolition waste. Apart from that, a small quantity of photocatalyst is used on the surface layer of the eco-block.

=== Producing process ===
A mechanized molding method is used for producing the Eco-Block. The materials are mixed with water and fly ash in a fixed proportion. Then the mixed materials will be molded under a combined vibrating and compacting action. Before put into use, the eco-block needs to be cured under suitable condition.

=== Coating ===
On the surface layer, there is a special coating made from titanium oxide (TiO_{2}). When activated by the sunlight, the titanium oxide can catalyze the decomposition of nitrous oxides into oxygen, water, sulphur, nitrates and other non-toxic solid compounds which can be washed away by water.

== Development ==
Eco-Block has currently undergone three generations and each generation has a slightly different composition. In general, all the generations made up of local construction waste. In the second generation, recycled glass powder from recycled glass bottles were added in the incorporation in Eco-Block for making its outlook more appealing and providing a wider range of usages of it. In the third generation, a photo-catalyst was added in the production process which catalyzes a chemical reaction and helps improve the air quality in Hong Kong.

== Features ==
Eco-Block is a construction material and its surface layer is made of sand, glass sand, fly ash and cement while the base layer is made of coarse aggregate, sand, glass sand, fly ash and cement.

=== De-polluting effect ===
Eco-block can remove air pollutant such as nitrogen oxide, which causes acid rain. Eco-block converts toxic air pollutants into harmless compounds by decomposition. Also, it help to reduce exhaust gases from roadside vehicles.

=== Alleviate pressure of landfill ===
Eco-Block is made of daily activated sludge inside waste water plant, recycled glasses and construction waste. Therefore, Eco-block utilizes waste in manufacturing and reduces pressure in landfills.

=== Save coal consumption ===
Since Eco-Block has a relatively high compressive strength, it reduce the coal consumption in brick manufacturing. .

== Applications of Eco-Block ==
Local schools and education institutions starts to adopt Eco-Block for pavement such as The Hong Kong Polytechnic University. “Eco-blocks for Eco-schools”, which is a joint programme held by The Hong Kong Polytechnic University and HSBC Insurance, aims at improved environment and air quality of schools with the use of the Eco-Block since 2008. King Lam Catholic Primary School (景林天主教小學) was one of beneficiary and an area of 200 square metres on the school premises has been paved with Eco-block.

According to the Hong Kong government, in 2011 the government brought and used Eco-Block which total areas was around 17 hectare in government public works contracts including 1000 and 1500 square meters of Eco-Block paving in Kwun Tong Garden Estate, which located in Ngau Tau Kok, and Sha Tau Kok Chuen.

== Awards ==
Awards list

- Notable Mention, ECO-Products Award 2006, Hong Kong (2006)
- Merit Award, Green Building Award, Hong Kong (2006)
- Gold Award – The 6th International Exhibition of Inventions (2008)
- Best Invention Award from Macao Foundation (2008)
