= Plastic sequestration =

Securing plastic out of industry and out of the environment

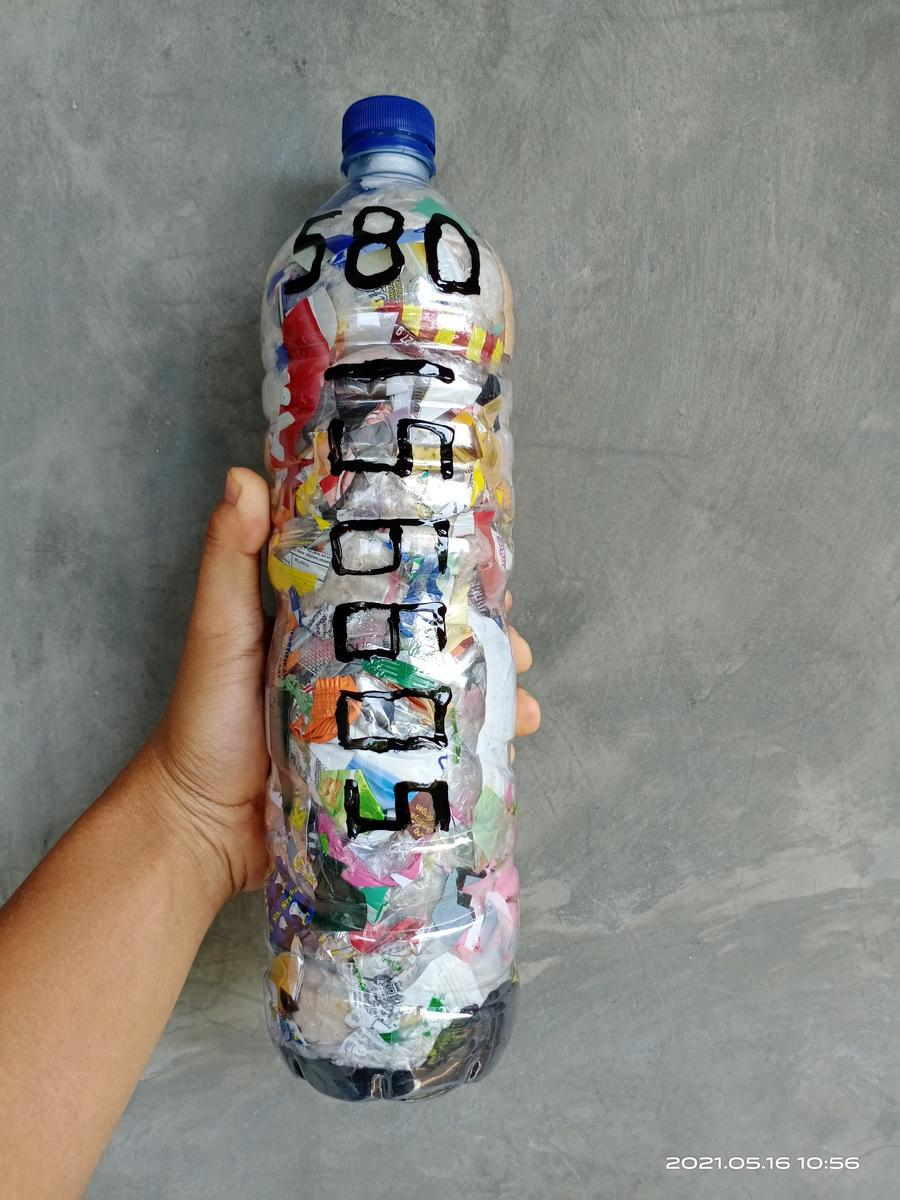
585g of plastic sequestered into an ecobrick. - Ecobrick and photo by Aang Hudaya, Bogor, Indonesia.

Plastic sequestration is a means of plastic waste management that secures used plastic out of industry and out of the environment into reusable building blocks made by manual compaction. Plastic sequestration is motivated by environmental protection and modeled on the Earth's process of carbon sequestration. Emerging out of the struggle of towns and communities in the Global South to deal with plastic pollution, plastic sequestration compaction methods are characterized by being locally based, non-capital, non-industrial and low-tech. Plastic sequestration is defined by the goals of securing plastic out of the environment and out of high energy/carbon industrial systems. Based on eliminating the chemical and physical and abiotic and biotic degradation pathways, plastic sequestration aims to achieve these goals, by terminally reducing the net surface area of thin film plastics. The building blocks that emerge from plastic sequestration are used in applications that further protect from degradation and permanently keep plastic out of industrial processes, thereby preventing their carbon emissions.

== Methodology ==
To deal with overwhelming plastic pollution in Tanzania, simple machines enable the local production of dense plastic boards and bricks.

=== Preparation ===
In general, plastic sequestration begins by segregating plastic from organics and other materials. The plastic is then cleaned and dried before it is manually compacted into dense blocks—typically using a stick or a press.

=== Examples ===
Examples of plastic sequestration include ecobricks, cigbricks, ocean ecobricks, ubuntu blox, specifically made dense plastic boards and blocks, and some products of the precious plastic movement. The methods of plastic sequestration is fundamentally distinct from landfilling and plastic burial. The Global Ecobrick Alliance, defines plastic sequestration as a non-industrial, manual, carbon-neutral compaction of used, clean and dry plastic that achieves a density over 0.33g/ml and a specific surface degradation rate (SSDR) below 0.1 μm year^{−1}.

=== Building Sequestration ===
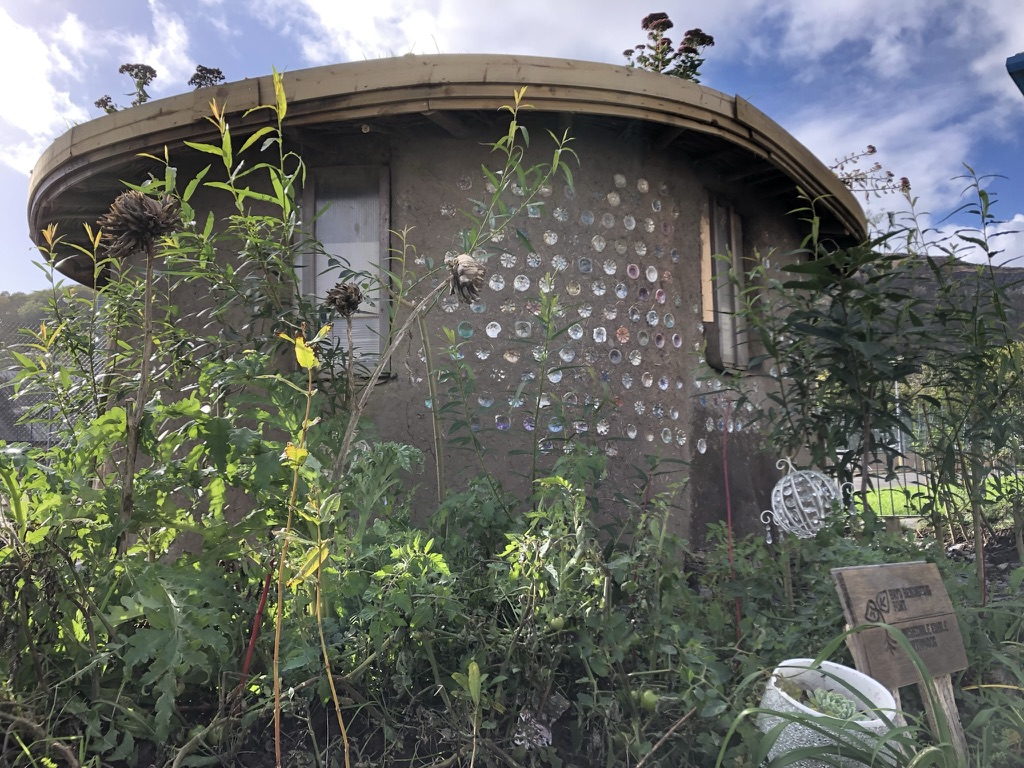
The 'Y Hwb' earthen round house, built using cob and ecobricks by Incredible Edible Porthmadog, North Wales, UK.

Building with the blocks that result from compaction is a part of the process of plastic sequestration. Typically, Cob (material) / adobe / earth building are used to completely encase the blocks. Earth building applications must protect from all forms of plastic degradation (i.e. heat, light, friction, fire, etc.). Earth building methods ensure that the blocks can be extricated undamaged from the construction when it comes to its end. Earth building methods also ensure that the construction process remains carbon-neutral.

== Theory ==
The concept of plastic sequestration as an ecological service that follows Earth's example of carbon sequestration was laid out at the Le Havre University's 50th Annual Bandung Spirit Conference, in a paper presented by Ani Himawati and Russell Maier. Building on this concept, the Global Ecobrick Alliance developed a theoretical framework and criteria for plastic sequestration in order to exclude applications that are not ecological services, and to encourage sequestration methodologies and applications that are. The criteria of plastic sequestration are based on the principles of Earthen Ethics, that delineate the parameters of ecological contribution, research by Center for International Environmental Law on the carbon impact of the plastic industry, and the science of preventing polymer degradation.

1. The process secures plastic from all forms of chemical and physical degradation and from industrial processing.
2. Outputs are indefinitely reusable, while tending towards applications that are of long-term earthen immersion.
3. The process must be conducted as a not-for-profit, for-Earth enterprise.
4. The process results in the sequestration of more carbon and more plastic than is added through emissions and replacement plastic.
5. The process and its outputs support the diversification of life.
6. The enterprise tracks and publicly discloses all the plastic, carbon and biodiversity impacts of its process.

=== Science ===
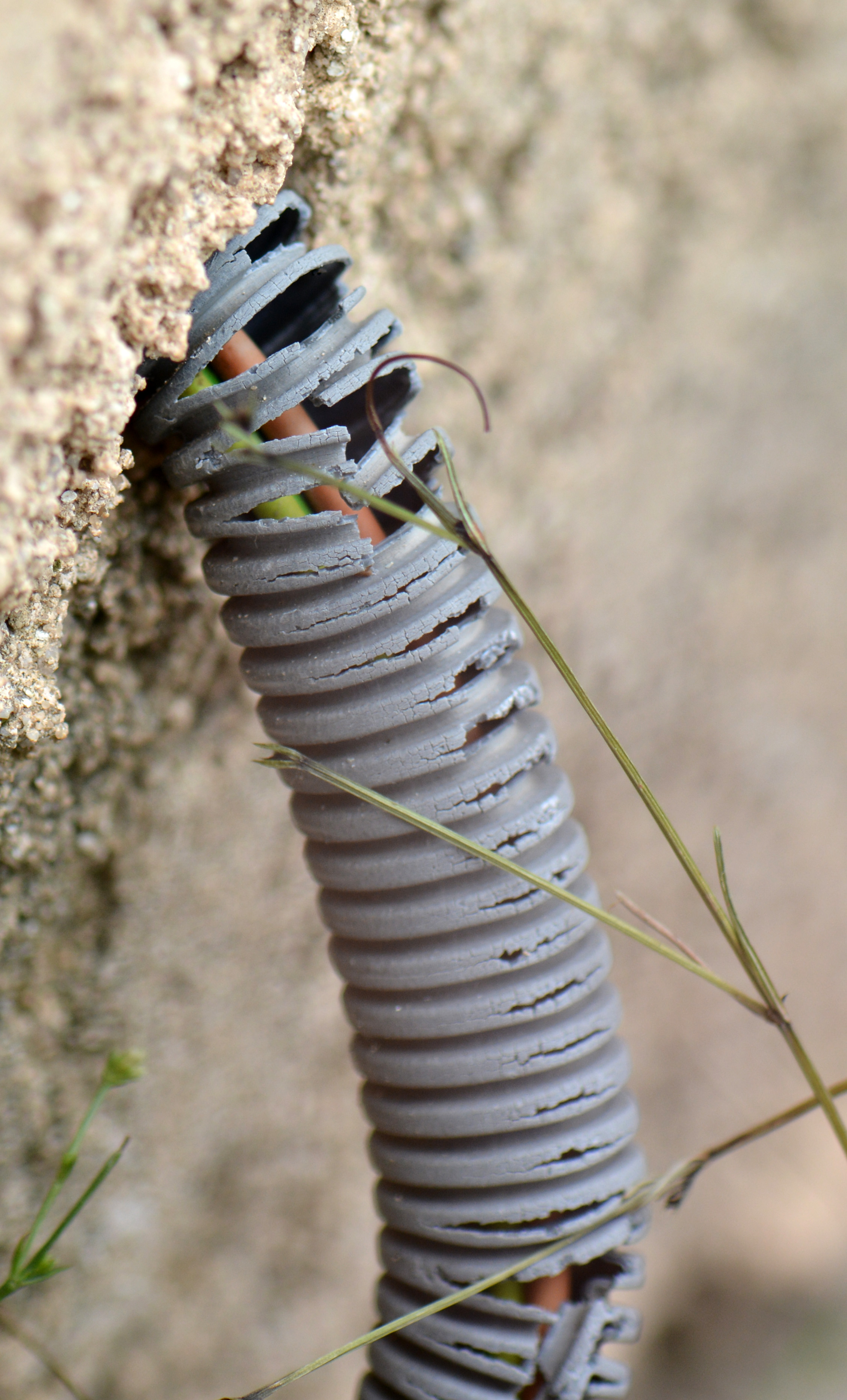
Air corrosion of a recent plastic sheath (PVC) exposed to air, wind, ultraviolet solar radiation and bad weather (Pyrenees)

The goal of plastic sequestration is to create the conditions to prevent the physical and chemical degradation of plastic (i.e. depolymerization, chemical modification, mass loss or mineralization to CO_{2} and H_{2}O) and the emissions of industrial processing. Plastic polymer degradation occurs in two ways: (i) physical, such as cracking, embrittlement, and flaking, or (ii) chemical, referring to changes at the molecular level. Chemical and physical degradation happens through biotic and abiotic pathways. Plastic sequestration methods must prevent chemical and physical degradation, by blocking biotic (microbial action) and abiotic (light, heat, acids, etc.) degradation pathways and by preventing industrial reprocessing. Emissions occur when plastic is processed industrially (i.e. recycling, landfilling, incineration)

==== Preventing Chemical and Physical Degradation ====
Research into the polymer degradation shows that in the environment, degradation occurs on the exposed surface of plastic and that net degradation is directly proportional to the amount of surface area exposed. Mathematical extrapolation indicates that a thin film of HDPE plastic (high surface area) can degrade 1100 times faster than a bead of plastic of the same weight (low surface area). Whereas a thin film of plastic will degrade in 1.8 ± 0.4 years a bead of plastic will endure for 2000 ± 400 years. Furthermore, by reducing the specific surface degradation rate (SSDR) of the low-surface-area plastic, it can endure indefinitely. Thus, plastic sequestration methodologies prioritize the terminal reduction of net surface area of the thin film plastics through compaction and building methods that prevent abiotic and biotic degradation, reducing the SSDR of the plastic to below 0.1 μm year–1.

==== Preventing Industrial Emissions & Dispersal ====
On average globally, each metric ton of plastic processed by recycling, land-filing and incineration generates 689 kg, 65Kg and 2967 kg of CO_{2}e respectively. Research also shows that of all the plastic generated over all-time, the industrial processing of plastic has dispersed 91% of into the biosphere. There it is subject to the chemical and physical degradation pathways mentioned above. Plastic sequestration aims to avoid these emissions and this dispersal by preventing plastic's industrial processing.

=== Earthen immersion ===
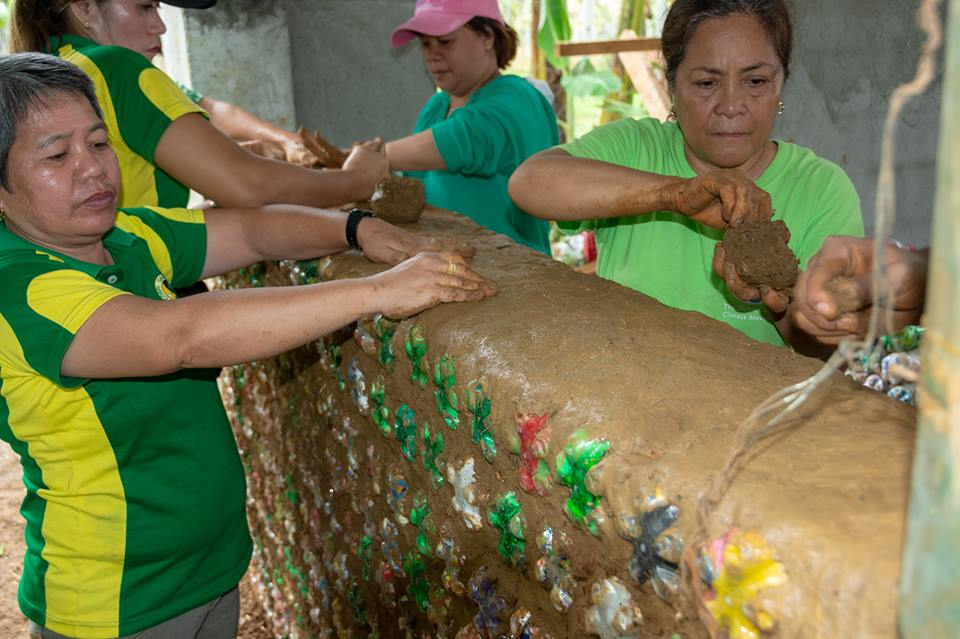
Women in the Philippines use cob and ecobricks to create a wall. Inside the cob, the plastic is indefinitely secured from degradation for the long term. Eventually, when the wall comes to its end, the ecobricks can be extricated and reused for another construction

Research has shown that covering plastic in earth is an effective method of preventing abiotic plastic degradation (i.e. preventing exposure to sunlight, friction, heat, etc.). Even plastic that is designed to degrade, when it is buried in low-oxygen soil, abiotic and biotic are prevented. Research also shows that submerging plastic in inert soil (minimal bacteria, micro-organisms) can further slow plastic degradation.

=== Earth emulation ===
Plastic sequestration is modeled on Earth's planetary process of carbon sequestration. Earthen carbon sequestration occurs through the carbon cycle's short and long-term processes: (i) the Earth's process of cycling carbon as life's building blocks (ii) the long-term process of removing carbon out of the atmosphere and sequestering it into geological storage. In the same way, plastic sequestrated blocks have a short and long-term plan: (i) blocks are made to be indefinitely reusable. (ii) blocks are put to use into longer and longer term buildings. Just as the Earth sequestered carbon under ground indefinitely, long-term plastic sequestration applications immerse its blocks in earthen constructions, blocking biotic and abiotic forms of plastic degradation (i.e. photo-degradation, heat, fire and friction).

== History ==
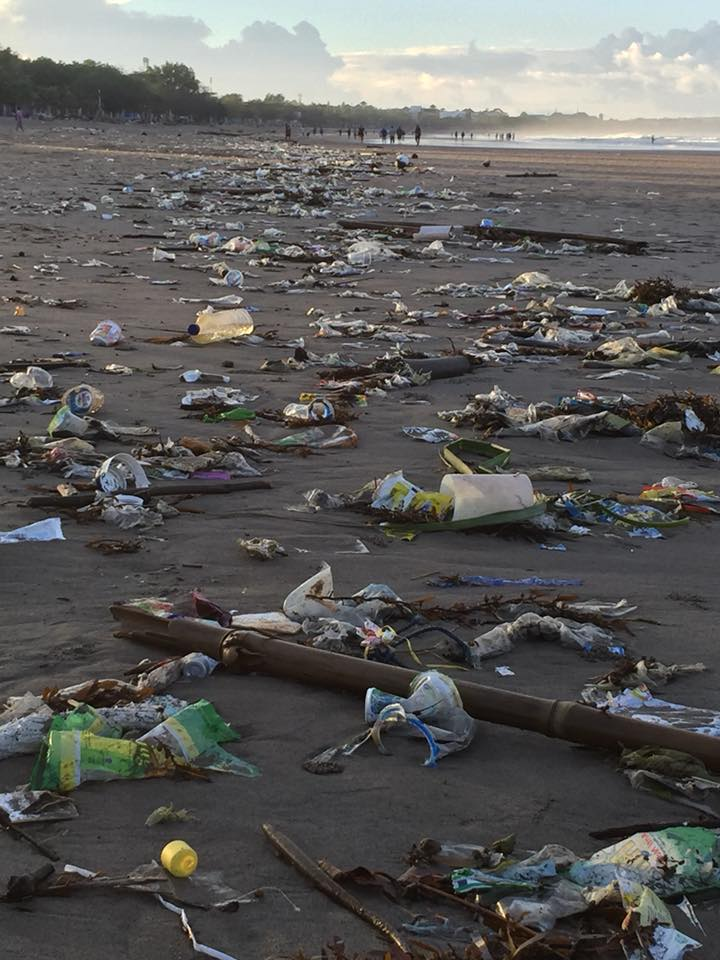
Plastic washes up on Kuta beach in Bali, Indonesia.

=== Context ===
Since 1950 an estimated 8,300 million metric tons (Mt) of virgin plastics have been produced worldwide; 9% of which has been recycled, 12% were incinerated and 79% have accumulated in landfills or the natural environment. In the early 2000s, the increase in plastic products and packaging became an overwhelming problem for rural towns and communities. Without recourse to industrial [plastic recycling], incineration or waste exportation, plastic waste began to become a serious aesthetic and environmental issue for towns and villages in the global south.

=== Global South emergence ===
Driven by local aesthetic and environmental concerns, plastic solution innovation has been led by communities in the global south. In particular, grass roots methods practically and physically dealing with plastic pollution first emerged in the global south. Examples include Ecobrick movement, Ubuntu Blox, and the Precious Plastic brick creation.

These methods of plastic compaction were characterized by being locally based, non-capital, and non-industrial. The original focus of these methods was to turn large amounts of waste plastic into valuable, saleable products (i.e. bricks, boards, blocks, etc.) that could be "sustainable substitute for equivalents" to traditional construction materials.

=== Shift to sequestration ===
Over the last decade, research on plastic loose in the environment has demonstrated clearly the deleterious effects on human health and ecological effects. leading to a steady increase in the awareness of the effects of dumped, recycled and burned plastic. As awareness increased, the focus of grassroots upcycling shifted from creating products of value to a focus on securing plastic from contaminating the biosphere and being industrially processed, leading to the concept of 'plastic sequestration' being coined. Plastic sequestration emerged to focus on the value of 'the absence of plastic from the biosphere' and the value of avoiding the carbon impact of industrial processing.

=== Global North emergence ===
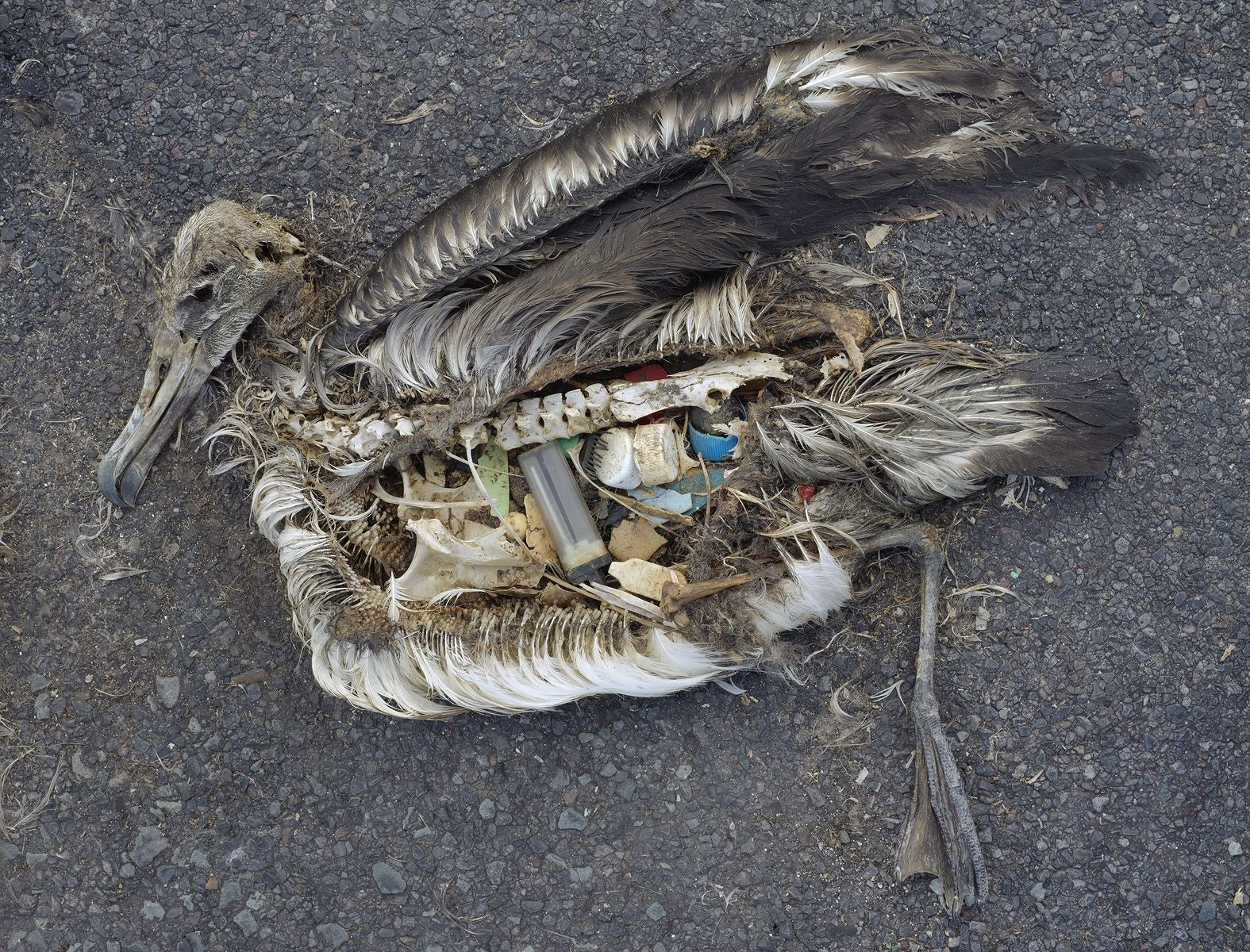
Albatross at Midway Atoll Refuge: The story of plastic washing up on Midway Island to the detriment of Albatross population sparked widespread plastic pollution concern.

On January 1, 2018, China banned plastic imports in its National Sword program. Displaced plastic exports from Europe and America were diverted to Indonesia, Turkey, India, Malaysia, and Vietnam where lacking environmental regulations have resulted in wholesale air, water and earth pollution around processing plants. Through popular documentaries and investigative journalism, public skepticism of industrial and government recycling programs began to increase. 2018 Consequently, a movement in western countries turned to methods such as ecobricking and home-made plastic recycling machines, to manage plastic instead.
