= Susana Heisse =

Guatemalan activist

Susana Heisse is an environmental activist in Guatemala. She is the founder of Pura Vida (Pure Life) and has developed the first construction system with eco bricks and spread use of Ecobricks, a plastic bottle stuffed with plastic trash: a way to rein in trash around Lake Atitlán.
