= Construction waste =

Unwanted material produced directly or incidentally by the construction industries

Construction waste causing substantial fugitive dust emission in a densely populated area in Hong Kong

Construction waste or debris is any kind of debris left from a construction process. Different government agencies have clearer definitions. For example, the United States Environmental Protection Agency (EPA) defines construction and demolition materials as "debris generated during the construction, renovation and demolition of buildings, roads, and bridges." Additionally, the EPA has categorized construction and demolition (C&D) waste into three categories: non-dangerous, hazardous, and semi-hazardous.

Of total C&D waste in the United States, 90% comes from the demolition of structures, while waste generated during construction accounts for less than 10%. Construction waste frequently includes materials that are hazardous if disposed of in landfills. Such items include fluorescent lamps, batteries, and other electrical equipment.

Waste from a construction project can contain "microplastics, PFAS, titanium dioxide, dyes and various chemicals and toxins that originate from the resin and masonry-based finishes used in buildings, such as paint, stain, plaster, grout, adhesives and patching compounds."

When waste is created, options of disposal include exportation to a landfill, incineration, direct site reuse through integration into construction or as fill dirt, and recycling for a new use if applicable. In dealing with construction and demolition waste products, it is often hard to recycle and repurpose because of the cost of processing. Businesses recycling materials must compete with often the low cost of landfills and new construction commodities.

Data provided by 24 states reported that solid waste from C&D accounts for 23% of total waste in the U.S. This is almost a quarter of the total solid waste produced by the United States. During construction a lot of this waste spends in a landfill leaching toxic chemicals into the surrounding environment. Results of a recent questionnaire demonstrate that although 95.71% of construction projects indicate that construction waste is problematic, only 57.14% of those companies collect any relevant data.

== Types of waste ==
C&D Materials, construction and demolition materials, are materials used in and harvested from new building and civil engineer structures. Much building waste is made up of materials such as bricks, concrete and wood damaged or unused during construction. Observational research has shown that this can be as high as 10 to 15% of the materials that go into a building, a much higher percentage than the 2.5-5% usually assumed by quantity surveyors and the construction industry. Since considerable variability exists between construction sites, there is much opportunity for reducing this waste.

There has been a massive increase in construction and demolition waste created over the last 30 years in the United States. In 1990, 135 million tons of construction and demolition debris by weight were created and had risen to 600 million tons by the year 2018. This is a 300% increase, but since 2015 the EPA has kept records of how the waste is disposed of. In 2018, 600 million tons of waste was created due to construction and demolition, and 143 million tons of it resides in landfills. This means that about 76% of waste is now retained and repurposed in the industry, but there is still more waste being exported to landfills than the entire amount of waste created in 1990.

This unsustainable consumption of raw materials creates increasing business risks. This includes higher material costs or disruptions in the supply chains. In 2010, the EPA created the Sustainable Materials Management (SMM) Program Strategic Plan which marked a strategic shift by the EPA to move emphasis from broad resource recovery initiative to sustainable materials management. Since material management regulations largely exist at a state and local level, this is no real standard practice across the nation for responsible waste mitigation strategies for construction materials. The EPA aims to increase access to collection, processing, and recycling infrastructure in order to meet this issue head on.

=== Main causes of waste ===
Construction waste can be categorized as follows: Design, Handling, Worker, Management, Site condition, Procurement and External. These categories were derived from data collected from past research concerning the frequency of different types of waste noted during each type of these activities. Examples of this type of waste are as follows:

==== Steel reinforcement ====
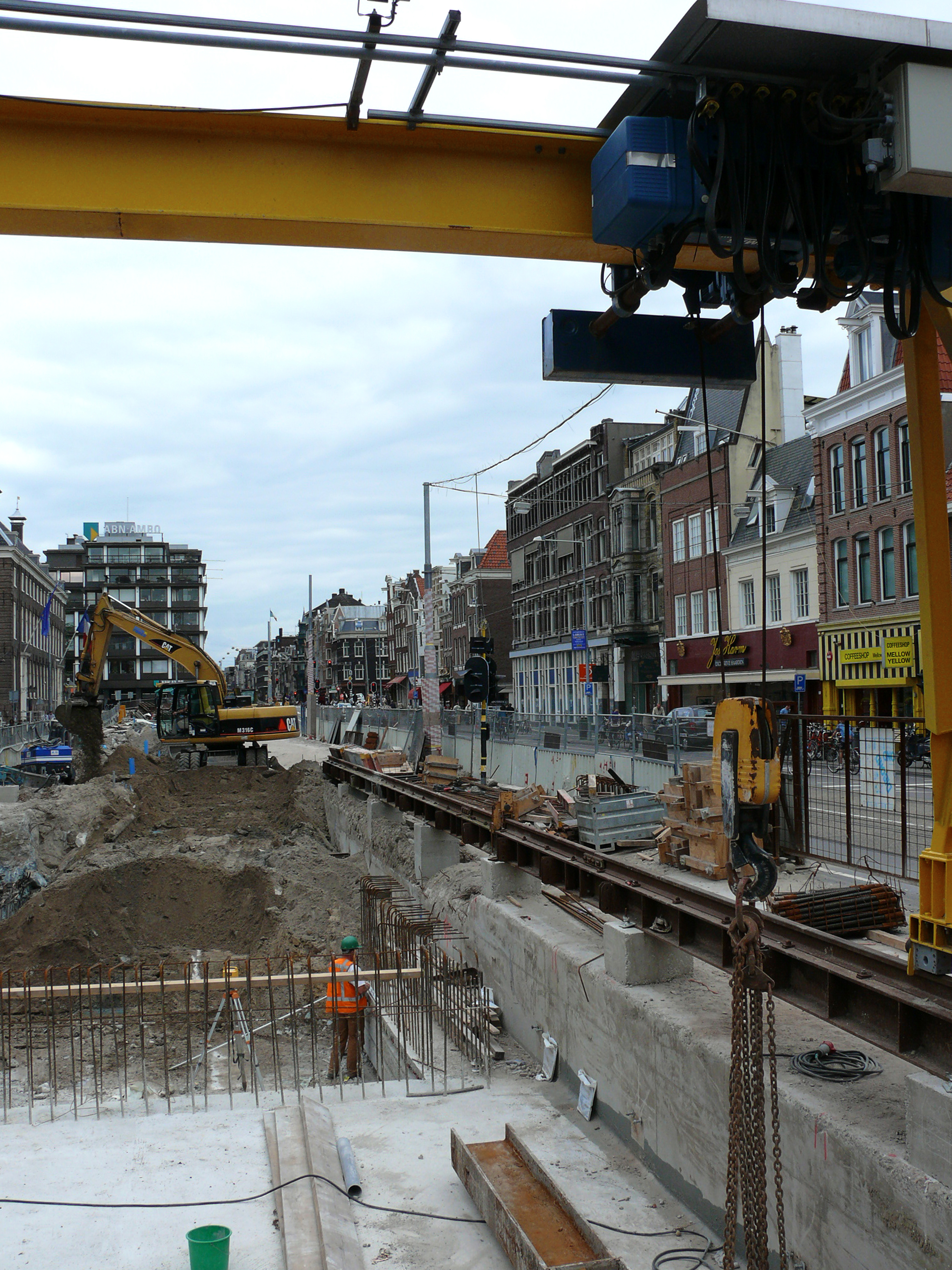
Construction site in Amsterdam

Steel is used as reinforcement and structural integrity in the vast majority of construction projects. The main reasons steel is wasted on a site is due to irresponsible beam cutting and fabrication issues. The worst sites usually end up being the ones that do not have adequate design details and standards, which can result in waste due to short ends of bars being discarded due to improper planning of cuts. Many companies now choose to purchase preassembled steel reinforcement pieces. This reduces waste by outsourcing the bar cutting to companies that prioritize responsible material use.

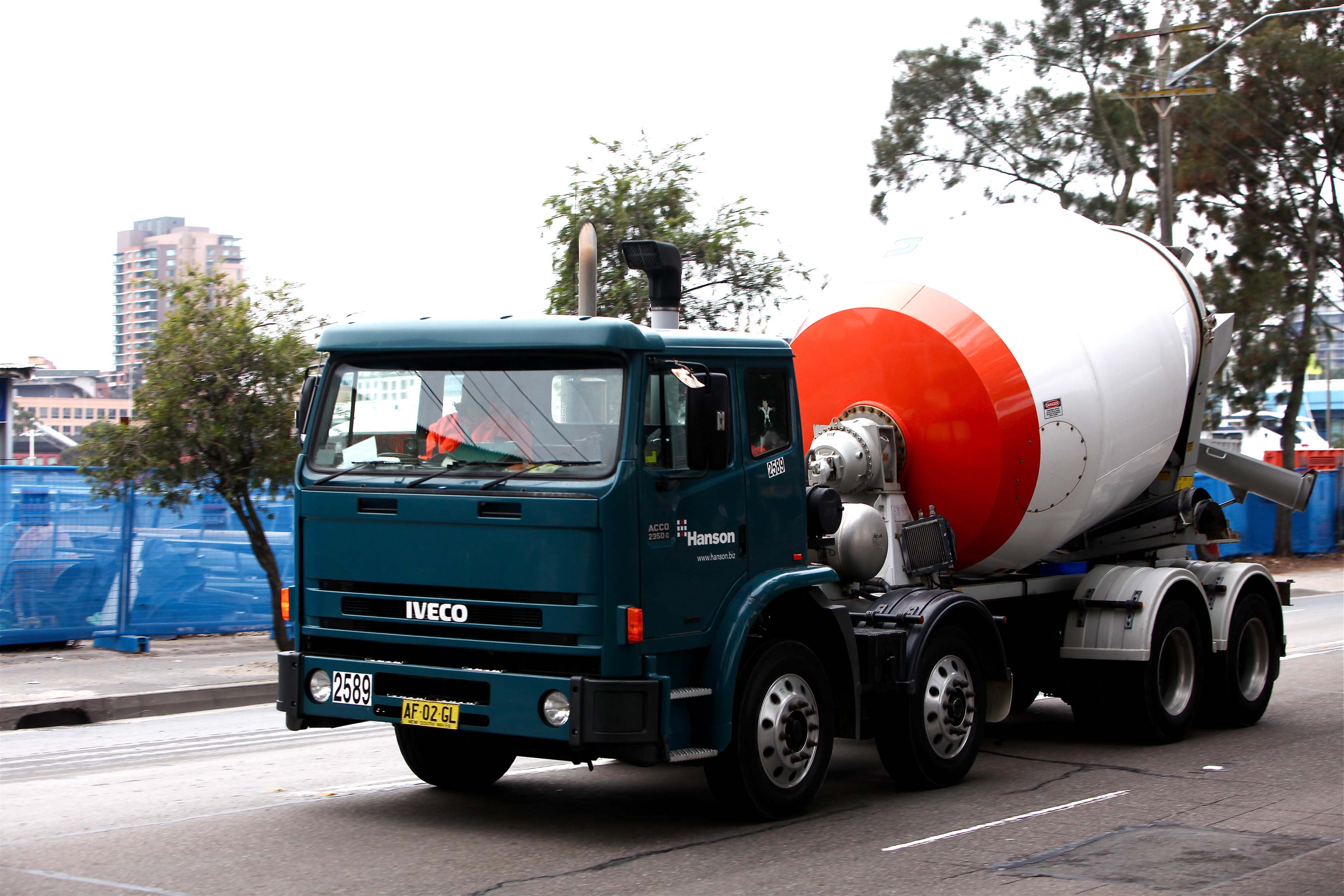
Concrete Mixer

==== Premixed concrete ====
Premixed concrete has one of the lowest waste indices when compared to other building materials. Many site managers site the difficulties controlling concrete delivery amounts as a major issue in accurately quantifying concrete needed for a site. The deviations from actually constructed concrete slabs and beams and the design amounts necessary were found to be 5.4% and 2.7% larger than expected, respectively, when comparing the data from 30 Brazilian sites. Many of these issues were attributed to inadequate form layout or lack of precision in excavation for foundation piles. Additionally, site managers know that additional concrete may be needed, and they will often order excess material to not interrupt the concrete pouring.

==== Pipes and wires ====
It is often difficult to plan and keep track of all the pipes and wires on a site as they are used in so many different areas of a project, especially when electrical and plumbing services are routinely subcontracted. Many issues of waste arise in this area of the construction process because of poorly designed details and irresponsible cutting of pipes and wires leaving short, wasted pipes and wires.

==== Improper material storage ====
The second leading cause of construction waste production is improper material storage. Exposure to the elements and miss handling by persons are due to human error. Part of this human error can lead to illegal dumping and illegal transportation volume of waste from a jobsite.

== Recycling, disposal and environmental impact ==
=== Recycling and reuse of material ===
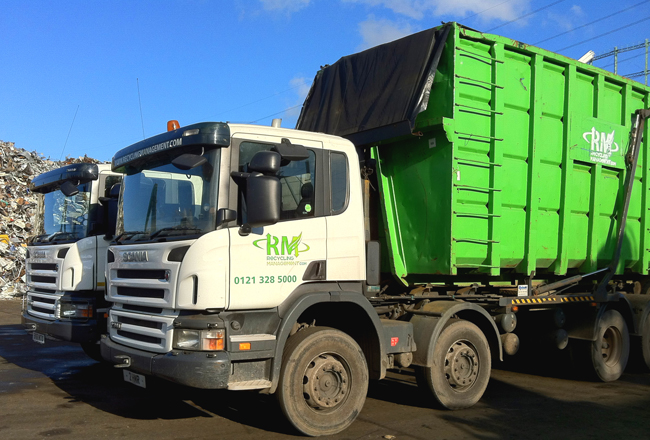
Recycling Trucks

Most guidelines on C&D waste management follows the waste managing hierarchy framework. This framework involves a set of alternatives for dealing with waste arranged in descending order of preference. The waste hierarchy is a nationally and internationally accepted concept used to priorities and guide efforts to manage waste. Under the idea of Waste Hierarchy, there is the concept of the "3R's," often known as "reduce, reuse, recycle." Certain countries adopt different numbers of "R's." The European Union, for example, puts principal to the "4R" system which includes "Recovery" in order to reduce waste of materials. Alternatives include prevention, energy recovery, (treatment) and disposal.

It is possible to recycle many elements of construction waste. Often roll-off containers are used to transport the waste. Rubble can be crushed and reused in construction projects. Waste wood can also be recovered and recycled.

Crushed demolition waste can also be repurposed as a granular filler in sensible thermal energy storage tanks, providing thermal storage capacity and energy recovery comparable to natural aggregates such as volcanic rock.

=== Landfilling ===
Some certain components of construction waste such as plasterboard are hazardous once landfilled. Plasterboard is broken down in landfill conditions releasing hydrogen sulfide, a toxic gas. Once broken down, Plasterboard poses a threat for increases Arsenic concentration Levels in its toxic inorganic form. The traditional disposal way for construction waste is to send it to landfill sites. In the U.S., federal regulations now require groundwater monitoring, waste screening, and operator training, due to the environmental impact of waste in C&D landfills (CFR 1996). Sending the waste directly to a landfill causes many problems:

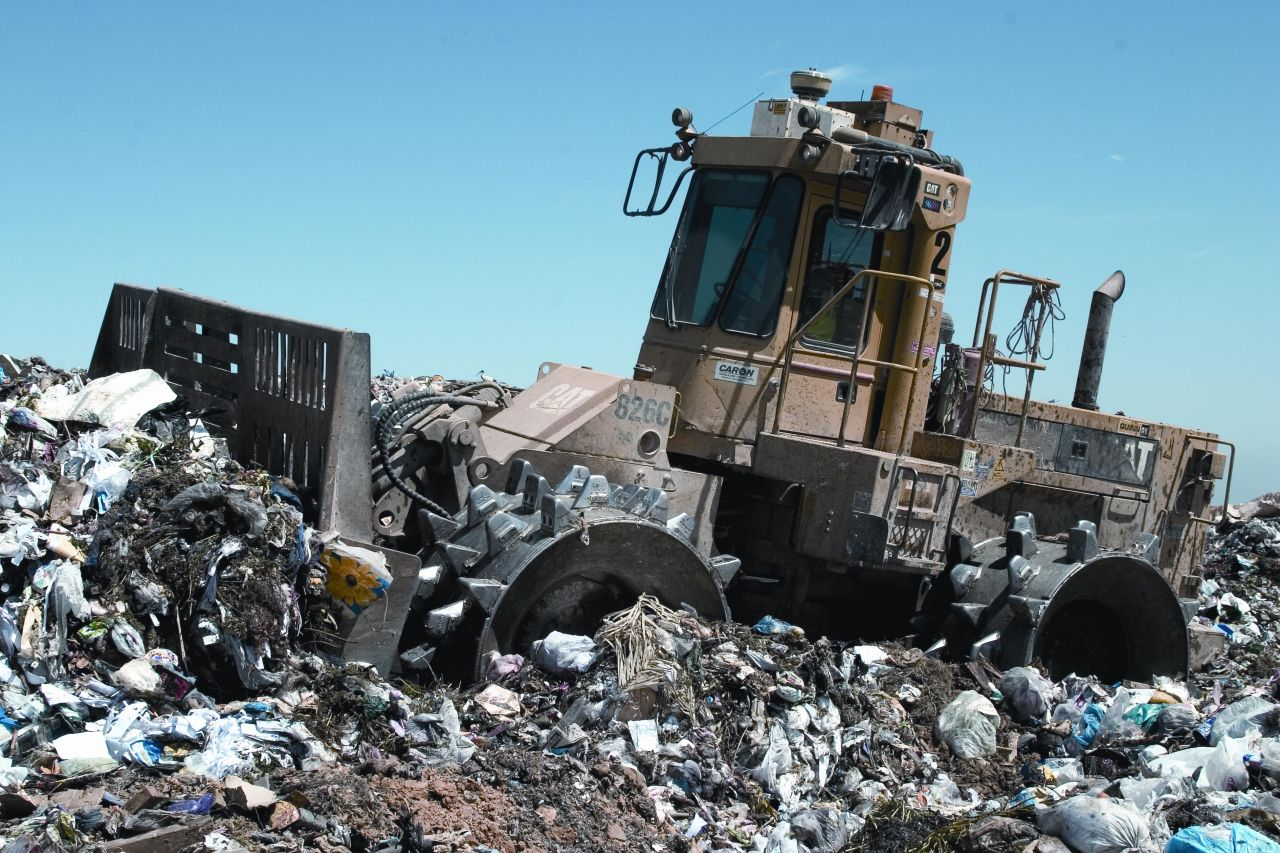
Landfill

- Waste of natural resources
- Increases construction cost, especially the transportation process
- Occupies a large area of land
- Reduces soil quality
- Causes water pollution (Leachate)
- Causes air pollution
- Produces security risks etc.

=== Incineration and health risks ===
Where recycling is not an option, the disposal of construction waste and hazardous materials must be carried out according to legislation of relevant councils and regulatory bodies. The penalties for improper disposal of construction waste and hazardous waste, including asbestos, can reach into the tens of thousands of dollars for businesses and individuals.

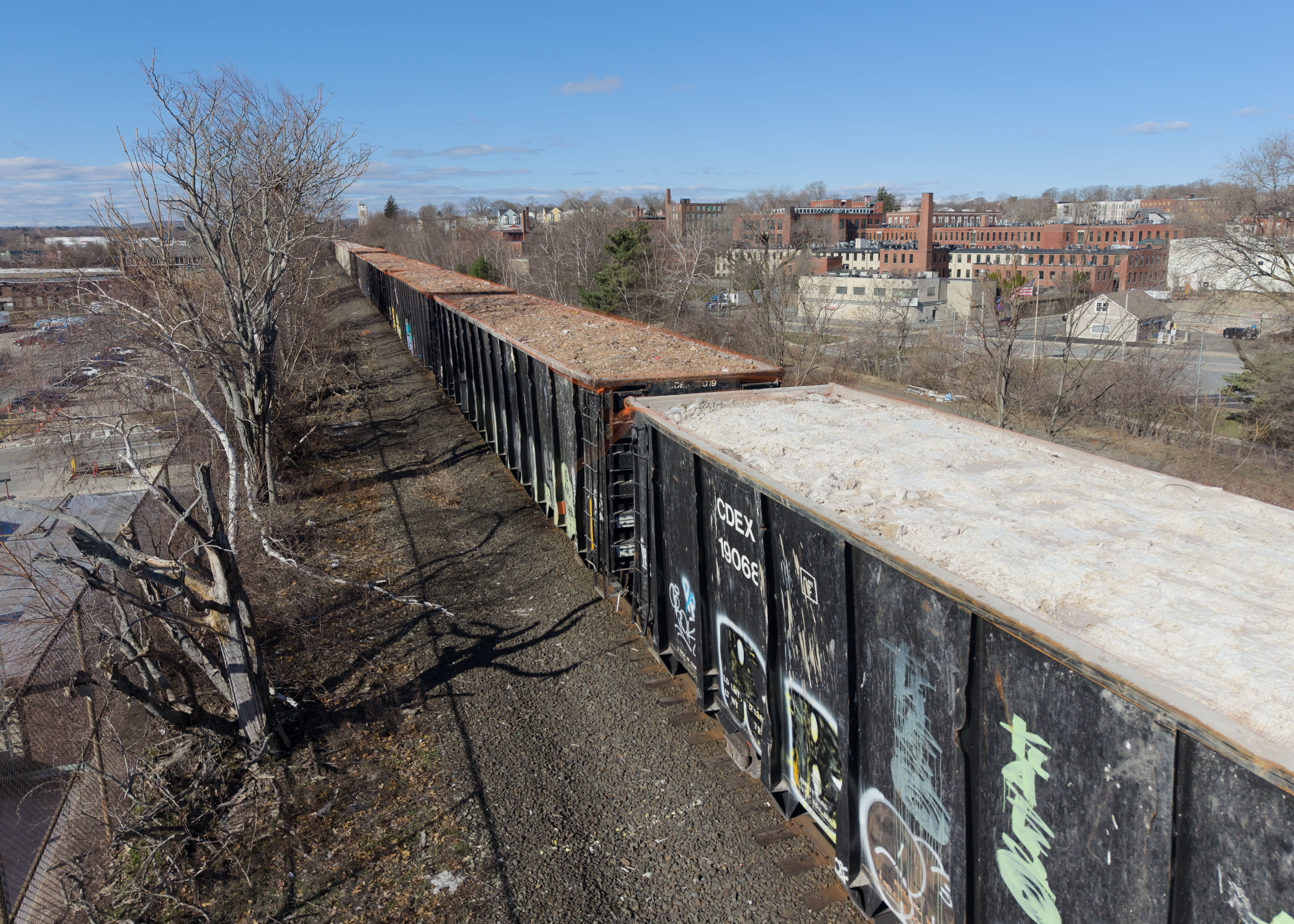
Rail cars carrying construction debris

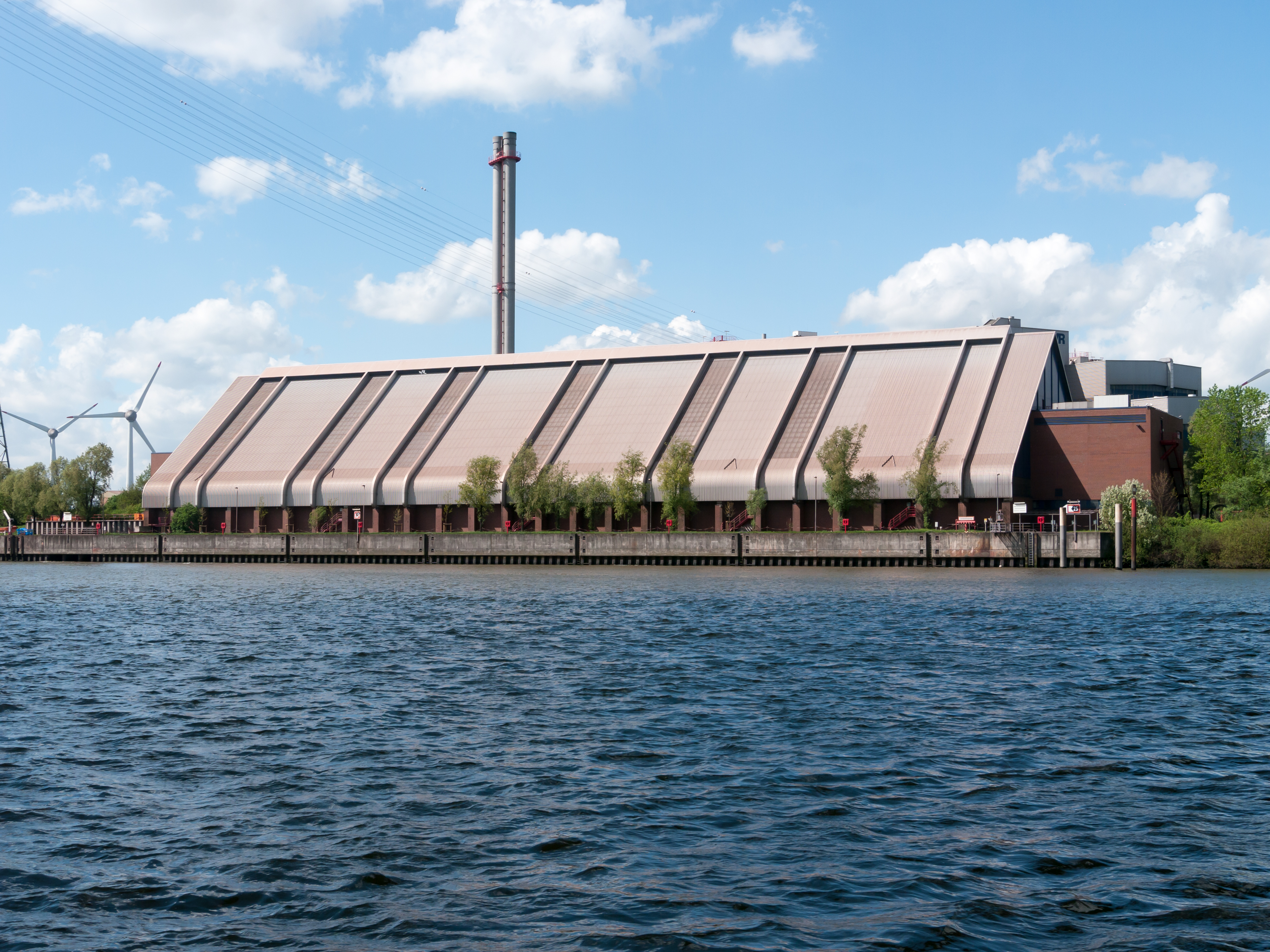
Waste Incinerator

Waste-to-energy facilities burn more than 13% of solid municipal waste. The toxic fumes emitted by WTE plants can contain harmful chemicals such as mercury and other heavy metals, carbon monoxide, sulfur dioxide, and dioxins.

Dioxin was used as a waste oil in Times Beach, Missouri. Days after the chemicals were introduced to the community animals began dying. By the time the EPA deemed dioxins to be highly toxic in the 1980s, the CDC recommended the town be abandoned entirely due to contaminated waste products in the area. By 1985, the entire population of Times Beach had been relocated, prompting Missouri to build a new incinerator on the contaminated land. They continued to burn 265,000 tons of dioxin-contaminated waste until 1997.

Dioxins are a family of chemicals produced as a byproduct during the manufacturing of many pesticides and construction materials like carpeting and PVC. These chemicals exist in the environment attached to soil or dust particles that are invisible to the naked eye.

Dioxins break down slowly. It still threatens public health at low levels. Since industry has mostly stopped producing dioxins, one of the largest contributors releasing harmful dioxins left in the United States is waste incineration. Dioxins have been proven to cause cancer, reproductive and developmental issues, and immune system damage. Rates of cancer such as non-Hodgkin's lymphoma and soft tissue sarcoma rise significantly the closer one lives to the pollutants' source.

== Management strategies ==
=== Waste management fees ===
Waste management fees, under the 'polluter pays principle', can help mitigate levels of construction waste. There is very little information on determining a waste management fee for construction waste created. Many models for this have been created in the past, but they are subjective and flawed. In 2019, a study method was proposed to optimize the construction waste management fee. The new model expands on previous ones by considering life-cycle costs of construction waste and weighs it against the willingness to improve construction waste management. The study was based out of China. China has a large waste management issue, and their landfills are mostly filled in urban areas. The results of the study indicated different waste management fees for metal, wood, and masonry waste as $9.30, $5.92, and $4.25, respectively. The cost of waste management per square meter, or just under 11 square feet, on average was found to be $0.12. This type of waste management system requires top-down legislative action. It is not a choice the contractor has the luxury of making on his/her own.

=== Europe ===
In the European Union (EU), there is now significant emphasis on recycling building materials and adopting a cradle-to-grave ideology when it comes to building design, construction, and demolition. Their suggestions are much clearer and easier at the local or regional level, depending on government structure. In the 2016 EU Construction & Demolition Waste Management Protocol, they emphasize the benefits beyond financial gains for recycling such as job creation and reduced landfilling. They also emphasize the consideration of supply and demand geography; if the recycling plants are closer to urban areas than the aggregate quarries this can incentivize companies to use this recycled product even if it is not initially cheaper. In Austria, there are new improvements in the recycling of unusable wood products to be burnt in the creation of cement which offsets the carbon footprint of both products.

The EU urges local authorities who issue demolition and renovation permits to ensure that a high-quality waste management plan is being followed, and they emphasize the need for post-demolition follow-ups in order to determine if the implemented plans are being followed. They also suggest the use of taxation to reduce the economic advantage of the landfills to create a situation where recycling becomes a reasonable choice financially. However, they do include the fact that the tax should only apply to recyclable waste materials. The main points of how the Europeans choose to address this issue of waste management is through the utilization of the tools given to a governing body to keep its people safe. Unlike in the United States, the EU's philosophy on waste management is not that it is an optional good thing to do when you can but a mandatory part of construction in the 21st century to ensure a healthy future for generations to follow.

Taxing landfill has been most effective in Belgium, Denmark and Austria, which have all decreased their landfill disposal by over 30% since introducing the tax. Denmark successfully cut its landfill use by over 80%, reaching a recycling rate over 60%. In the United Kingdom, all personnel performing builders or construction waste clearance are required by law to be working for a CIS registered business. However, the waste generation in the UK continues to grow, but the rate of increase has slowed.

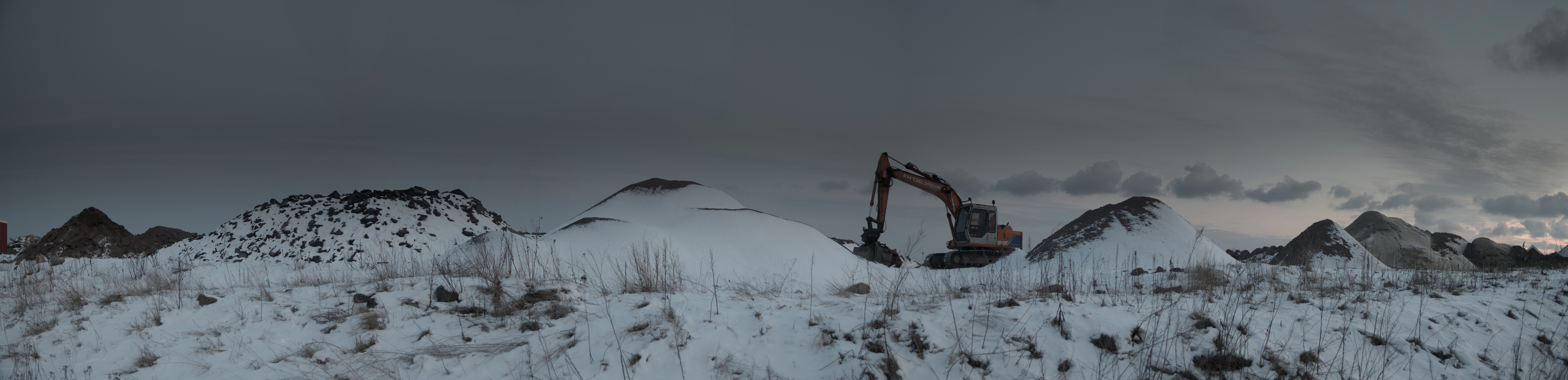
A panorama of construction waste in Horton, Norway

=== United States ===
The United States has no national landfill tax or fee, but many states and local governments collect taxes and fees on the disposal of solid waste. The California Department of Resource Recycling and Recovery (CalRecycle) was created in 2010 to address the growing C&D waste problem in the United States. CalRecycle aids in the creation of C&D waste diversion model ordinance in local jurisdictions. They also provide information and other educational material on alternative C&D waste facilities. They promote these ordinances by creating incentive programs to encourage companies to participate in the waste diversion practices. There are also available grants and loans to aid organizations in their waste reduction strategies. According to a survey, financially incentivizing stakeholders to reduce construction waste demonstrates favorable results. This information provides an alternative way to reduce the cost so that the industry is more careful in their project decisions from beginning to end.

== See also ==
- ATSDR
- Carcinogen
- Construction dust | Metal dust | Metal swarf | Lead dust | Asbestos | Cement dust | Concrete dust | Wood dust | Paint dust
- Concrete recycling
- COPD
- COSHH
- Demolition waste
- NIEHS
- Particulates | Ultrafine particle
- Power tool
- Recycling
- Silicosis
- VOC
- Waste management
- Welding
- Embodied carbon
