= Demolition waste =

Waste debris from destruction of buildings, roads, bridges, or other structures

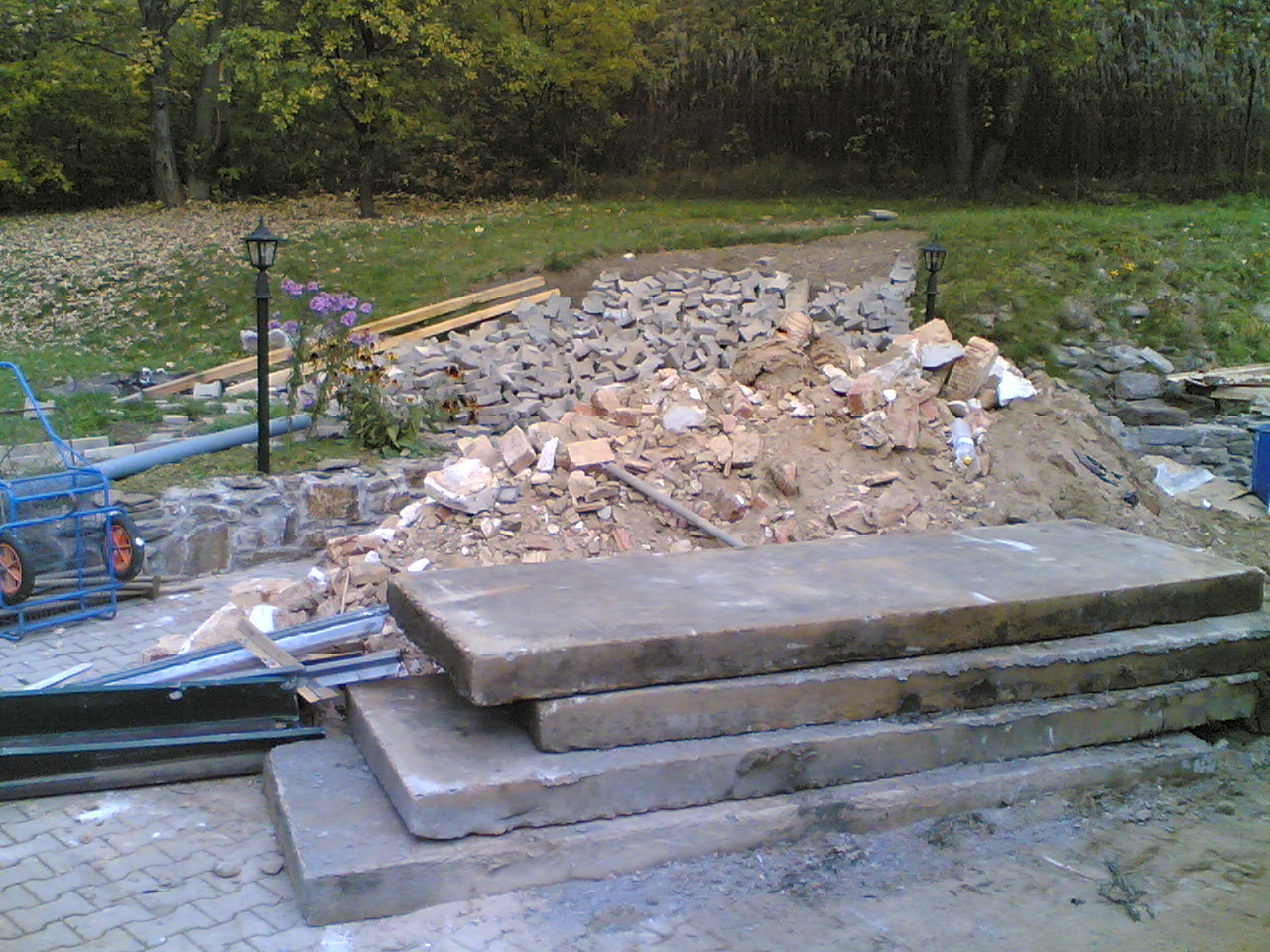
Demolition waste

Demolition waste is waste debris from destruction of buildings, roads, bridges, or other structures. Debris varies in composition, but the major components, by weight, in the US include concrete, wood products, asphalt shingles, brick and clay tile, steel, and drywall. There is the potential to recycle many elements of demolition waste.

== Composition ==
In 2014, 505.1 million tons of demolition debris was generated in the US. Out of the 505.1 million tons, the debris was composed of 353.6 million tons of concrete, 76.6 million tons of asphalt concrete, 35.8 million tons of wood product, 12.7 million tons of asphalt shingles, 11.8 million tons of brick and clay tile, 10.3 million tons of drywall and plaster, and 4.3 million tons of steel.

== Disposal ==
Before demolition debris is extracted, contamination from lead, asbestos or other hazardous materials must be resolved. Hazardous materials must be disposed of separately, according to federal regulation. Demolition debris can be disposed of in either Construction and Demolition Debris landfills or municipal solid waste landfills. Alternatively, debris may also be sorted and recycled. Sorting may happen as deconstruction on the demolition site, off-site at a sorting location, or at a Construction and Demolition recycling center. Once sorted, materials are managed separately and recycled accordingly.

== Recycling ==
Concrete and Brick

Concrete and brick can be recycled by crushing it into rubble. Once sorted, screened and contaminants are removed, reclaimed concrete or brick can be used in concrete aggregate, fill, road base, or riprap. Mobile concrete crushers also allow for recycling of concrete on-site.

Wood

Wood can be reused, repurposed, recycled, or burned as bioenergy. Reused wood can eliminate the need for full-size new lumber if used for smaller building components. Repurposed or recycled wood can be used in pathways, coverings, mulches, compost, animal bedding, or particleboard. Using recycled wood as a bioenergy feedstock is advantageous because it has lower water content, about 20% water, compared to virgin lumber, about 60% water.

Drywall

Drywall is made primarily of gypsum. Once the gypsum is depapered, it can be added in cement production, as a soil amendment, used in aerated composting, or recycled into new drywall. Gypsum recycling can be particularly beneficial because in landfill conditions gypsum will release hydrogen sulfide, a toxic gas.

Asphalt

Asphalt, from shingles or asphalt concrete, is typically recycled and used in pavement.

Metal

Scrap metal is an established industry focused on the collection, buying, selling, and recycling of salvaged materials.

== See also ==
- Construction waste – Unwanted material produced directly or incidentally by the construction industries
- Recycling – Converting waste materials into new products
- Concrete recycling – Re-use of rubble from demolished concrete structures
- Waste management – Activities and actions required to manage waste from its source to its final disposal
- Control of Substances Hazardous to Health Regulations 2002 – United Kingdom health and safety legislation
- Embodied carbon – Measure of greenhouse gas emissions
- List of solid waste treatment technologies
- Index of waste management articles
