= Ecology block =

Concrete block used in retaining walls

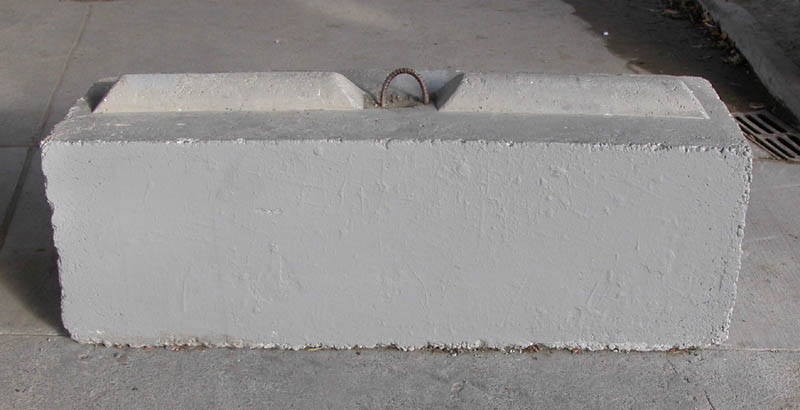
Ecology block with rebar loop on top for use with heavy equipment

An ecology block, also known as an eco-block or ecoblock, is a type of recycled concrete block used to make retaining walls. Ecology blocks are manufactured using concrete left over from other construction processes. A cross-section of an eco-block typically measures 2 feet (61 cm) square, with block lengths ranging from 3 feet (91 cm) to 6 feet (180 cm). One block weighs between 1,800 pounds (820 kg) and 4,000 pounds (1,800 kg).

== Uses ==
Ecology blocks are marketed for construction of retaining walls; they have grooves on the top and bottom to facilitate vertical stacking. They are used for storage of bulk materials and other modular construction projects where permanent structures are not needed. They have also been used as a temporary fix for a critical road in Skagit County, Washington, that had been damaged by floods. Following the September 11 attacks, at the Hanford Site's Plutonium Finishing Plant, eco-blocks and Jersey barriers were used to create a 1.5-mile (2.4 km) barrier against vehicular attack. The Seattle Police Department used eco-blocks to construct walls around their East Precinct building while the Capitol Hill Organized Protest was established nearby.

=== Hostile architecture ===
In response to homelessness in Seattle, several Seattle businesses and residents have deployed eco-blocks as hostile architecture in residential areas and outside of businesses, with the intention of discouraging homeless encampments and recreational vehicle (RV) parking by homeless persons who live in RVs. City law prohibits the use of eco-blocks on city streets, but as of August 1, 2022, compared with hundreds of eco-blocks deployed in the city, only 25 property and business owners have received warnings, and none have been fined. Eco-blocks are particularly popular in industrial areas of Seattle, the only areas where RVs have been allowed to park legally for up to 72 hours at a time. The Seattle Times reported in July 2022 that "a significant portion of public parking in Georgetown has been blocked" by ecology blocks. The blocks have also impeded delivery trucks, which cannot park between them to unload goods.

Seattle eco-block purchasers were attracted to eco-blocks' low cost, about US$20 per block, and the need for special equipment to remove them. In April 2023, the city removed some eco-blocks that abutted a city park that had been popular with homeless campers, but did not remove the blocks in public streets adjacent to a nearby Fremont Brewing facility owned by Sara Nelson, a member of the Seattle City Council, and her husband Matt Lincecum.

== Safety concerns ==
In February 2012, a 56-year-old heavy equipment operator in Washington state died after being crushed by an approximately 4,000-pound (1,800 kg) eco-block that was part of a wall used to subdivide a tank being used for fertilizer storage. The Washington State Department of Labor and Industries identified "Lack of training regarding the dangers of working around bulk material and ecology blocks" and "Possible destabilization of block wall due to granular material leaking between the blocks" as contributing factors to the incident, and noted that the employer created a training program about eco-block safety after the incident.

When constructing a retaining wall from eco-blocks, a stable foundation is still required. In July 2015, a 70-year-old man in Washington died after an ecology block wall under construction on a sand foundation collapsed, and his legs were crushed by a 3,600-pound (1,600 kg) block.

== See also ==
- Jersey barrier, a similarly sized concrete block used for vehicle traffic control
