= Ecobricks =

Environmentally friendly building method

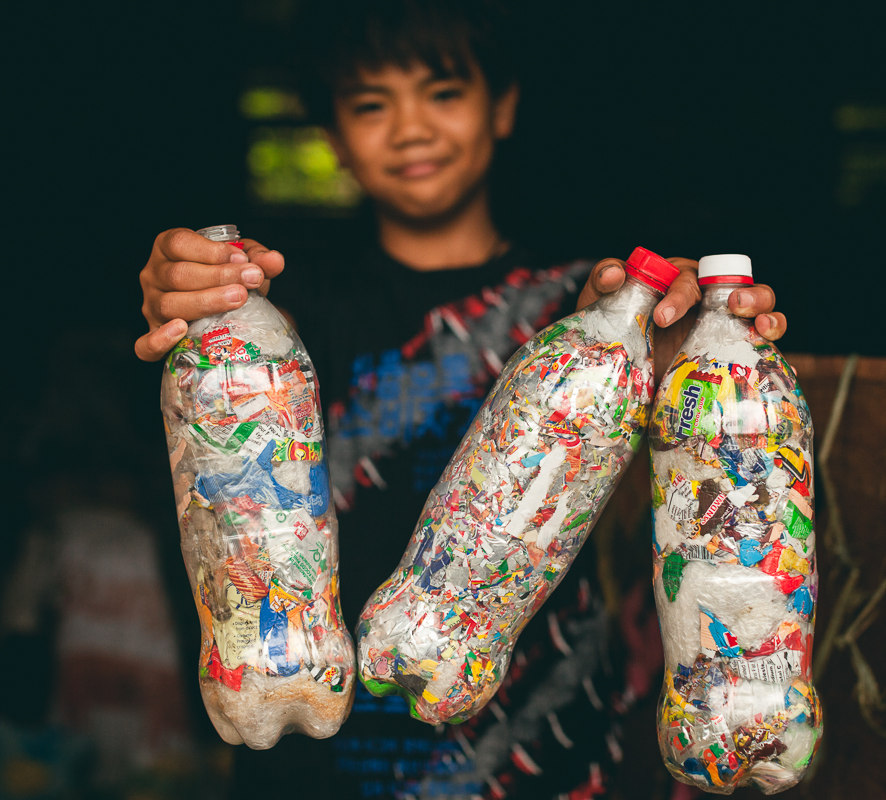
Ecobricks are plastic drinking bottles packed with non-biodegradable waste to make a reusable building block.

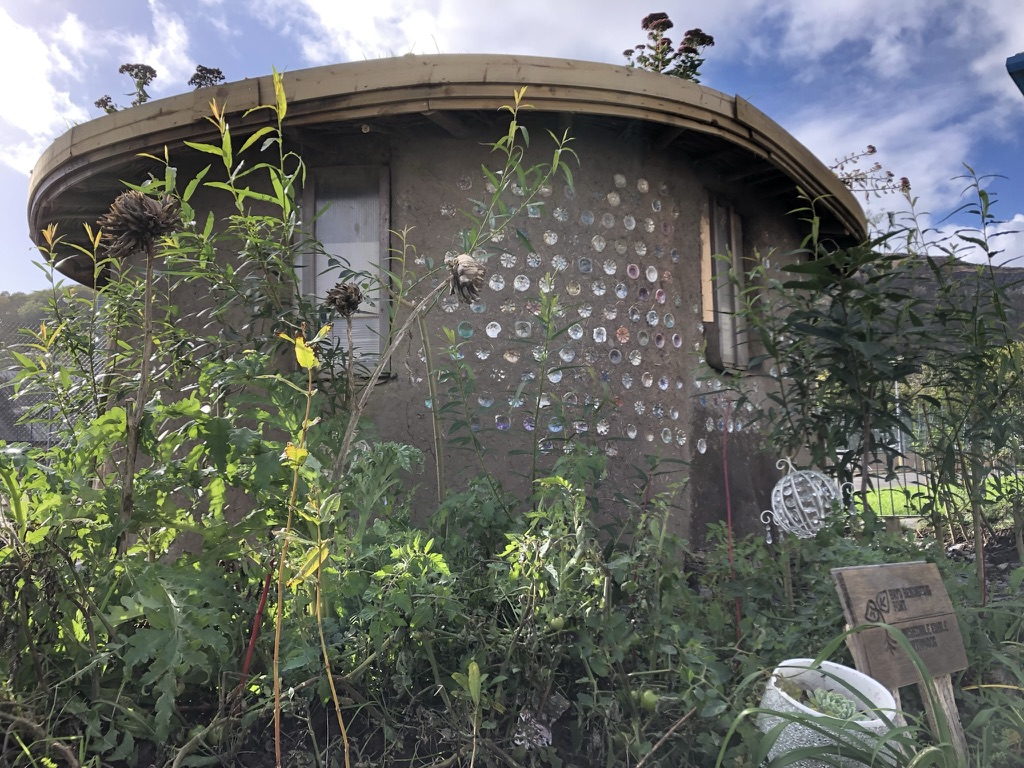
Structure in North Wales, UK composed of cob and ecobricks. This project symbolizes plastic sequestration, net-zero construction, as well as collaboration within the community. The 'Y Hwb' earthen roundhouse relates to environmental justice as these houses reduce usage of environmentally harmful building materials, reuses plastic, and utilizes green roofs. This type of housing allows citizens to construct their own homes on an extremely low budget and live there for very cheap.

An ecobrick is a plastic bottle that has been densely packed with used plastic to create a reusable building block that achieves plastic sequestration. These plastic bottles are packed with clean and dry plastic waste to avoid the growth of bacteria. Ecobricks can be used to produce various items, including furniture, garden walls and other structures. These plastic packed bottles are produced primarily as a means of managing consumed plastic by sequestering it and containing it safely, by terminally reducing the net surface area of the packed plastic to effectively secure the plastic from degrading into toxins and microplastics. The ecobricking movement promotes the personal ecobricking process as a strategy to raise awareness of the consequences of consumption and the dangers of plastic. It also promotes the collaborative process as a way to encourage communities to take collective responsibility for their used plastic and to use it to produce a useful product.

Typically, producers use a wood or bamboo stick to manually pack plastic into the plastic bottle. Containing and compacting plastic helps ensure these photo-grading materials stay in one place for numerous years. The strongest bottle candidates for ecobricks are thick and durable plastic bottles with wider cap openings that can resist UV radiation. Any size of transparent polyethylene terephthalate (PET) plastic bottle can be used to make an ecobrick. The bottle and the packed plastic are clean and dry to prevent the growth of bacteria. Plastic is cut or ripped into small pieces then packed little by little, alternating between adding the plastic and compacting it, layer by layer. The bottle is rotated with each press to ensure the plastic is evenly compacted throughout the bottle. This helps prevent voids and allows the packing to reach the requisite solidity needed for building block applications. Completed ecobricks are packed solid enough that they can bear the weight of a person without deforming—a density range between 0.33 g/ml and 0.7 g/ml. Maximizing density minimizes the flammability of the ecobrick while increasing its durability and re-usability.

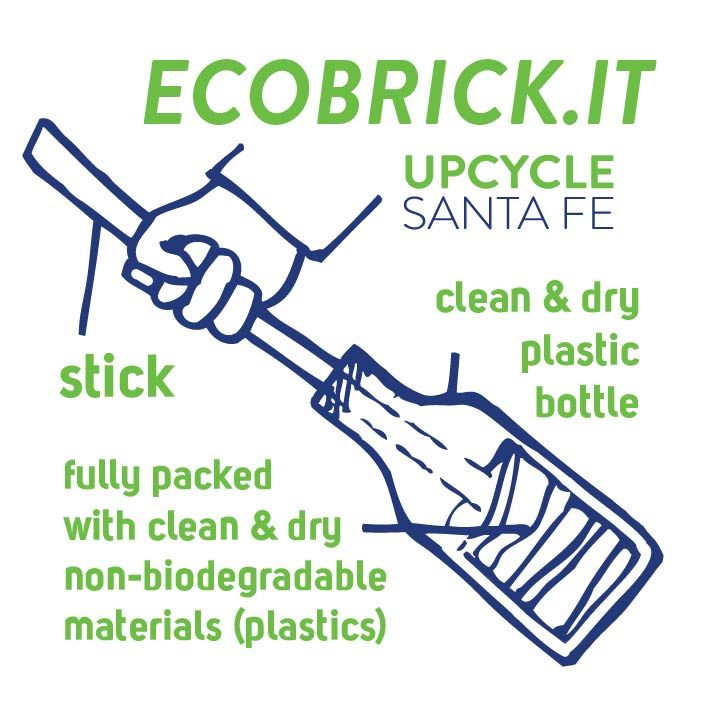
"Take a Plastic Bottle – Stuff it Full of plastic" instructions

== Context ==
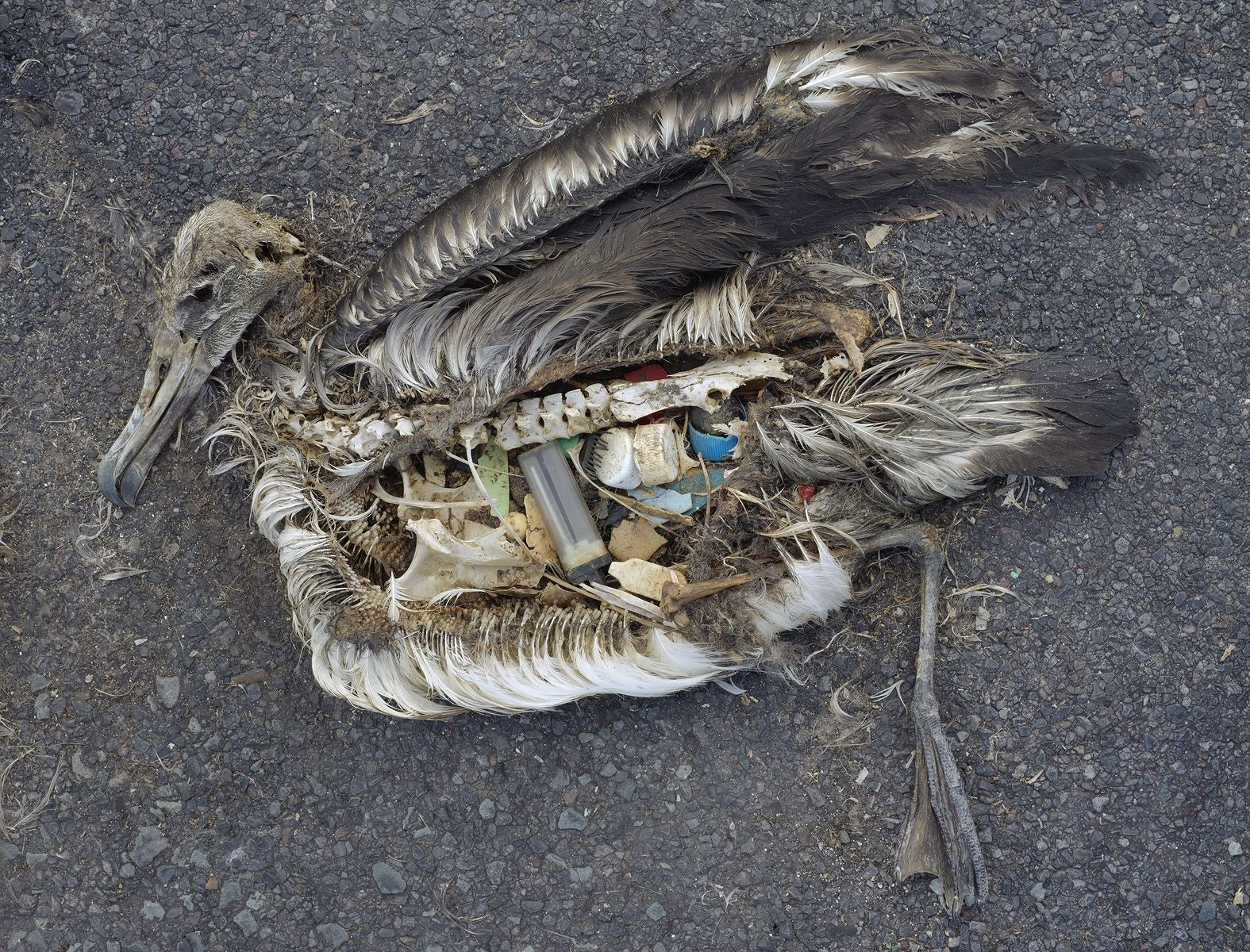
Albatross carcass at Midway Atoll Refuge showing ingested plastic.

The global ecobrick movement has emerged as the result of a number of local initiatives in locations around the world in response to the challenges associated with the management of plastic waste. As economic petroleum consumption and plastic production have increased, and as industrial waste management methods have struggled to keep pace, ecobricking has emerged as a local, non-industrial solution.

=== Rural community impact ===
In countries and communities without access to industrial recycling or incineration, plastic has accumulated in streets, ditches, and beaches. Without large scale options for managing plastic households and communities have been powerless to manage their own plastic, other than dangerous and toxin-producing low-temperature incineration, water, and land loose dumping.

When plastic accumulates in these areas, the plastic releases toxins into the ground that contaminate groundwater and possible food sources. This makes it difficult for lower income communities as they have to deal with serious health problems and little resources. The use of ecobricks has greatly reduced the amount of plastic scattered in these communities. Ecobricks are used to make walls, garden beds, chairs, tables, and so much more as they are a reliable and strong building material.

=== Ecobricks and environmental justice ===
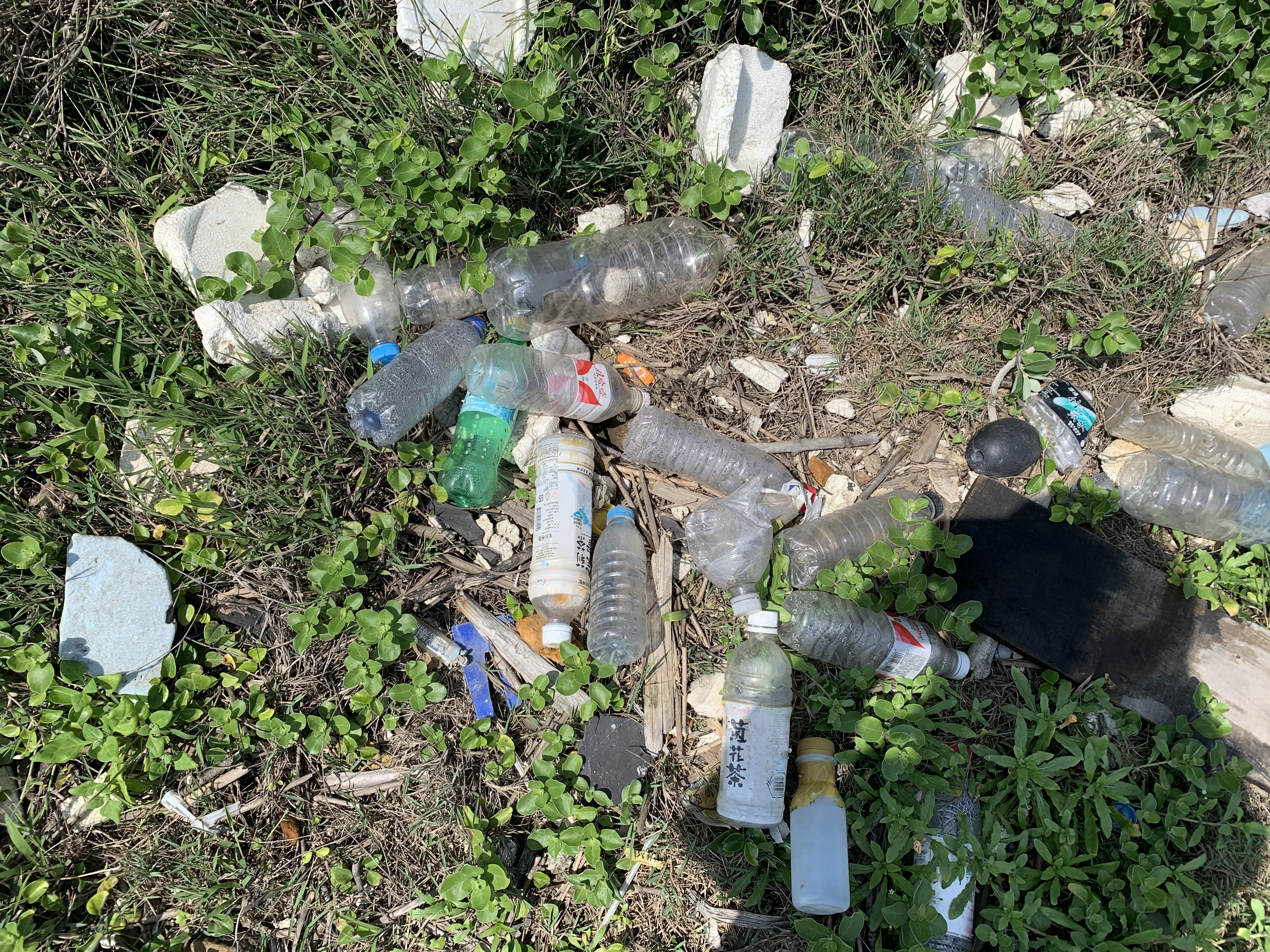
Plastic waste accumulating in Linshanbi, Taiwan.

Ecobricks have been used to build gardens, furniture, and even schools. The ecobricks website talks about a project using ecobricks to build a park almost five years ago in April 2019. This Ecobrick build project took place in Probolinggo, East Java, Indonesia. Thirty-three GEA (Global Ecobrick Alliance) trainers and 200 volunteers gathered at a park in Probolinggo, East Java to build a seating and garden area. They used a total of 1200 ecobricks, other organic materials and cement to create a mandala seating arrangement. The construction took place over 5 days and unfortunately, several hours after completion, rain struck and destroyed parts of the build. After that, the Paiton and Probolinggo park administrators were in charge of fixing and finishing the build. Since then, the build and the mandala park have been completed. The ecobricks website mentions this project on its webpage but there are many other projects and studies around the world that are spreading the awareness of ecobricks and their uses.

In addition to aiding lower income communities, ecobricks can be a creative learning activity for poverty-struck schools. The Bargua District in Kendari City, Indonesia teaches school children the importance of solving the district's plastic pollution crisis. Through creative children building ecobricks, Bargua compacts plastic waste while informing of young generations the harms of the substance. Another school in Indonesia, named SMP Nusa Bhaki, has addressed the country's increasingly concerning waste issue. This school has centralized on the creative learning mechanisms children can grasp through ecobricks. Teachers can give their children the innovative freedom to create products and materials with ecobricks. Moreso, all participants involved with the process of constructing ecobricks can spread the sustainable idea to their friends and families.

Ecobricks may even be the future for the resettlement of refugees. Due to extremely limited living conditions and scarce available land, Burmese refugees who fled to Bangladesh had to be moved to the country's island Bhasan Char. The government of Bangladesh built new refugee camps constructed of traditional building materials. A sustainable alternative for future refugee resettlements would be ecobricks. The utilization of local plastic waste as building components would significantly lower costs, C02 emissions, and consumption of other resources. This building alternative would also grant refugees the opportunity to build a positive and protective relationship with the environment.

Lower income communities feel the effects of plastic waste the worst as they don't have the funding to keep their environment clean. There is also a lack of education on plastic waste in these communities that prevent the proper disposal plastic and recycling methods. The Tanjung Mekar Village in Karawang Regency is an example of a village that have used ecobricks as a way to keep their environment clean and educate the public about plastic waste and pollution. There was also a study that took place in this village to determine if ecobricks were a better building material compared to regular concrete bricks and a material known as red bricks. They found that, when put under pressure, an ecobrick was able to withstand much more than the concrete and red bricks. This confirmed that ecobricks can be a cheap and environmentally friendly non-structural building material.

Ecobricks are a great way to recycle plastic waste as well as educate about the dangers of plastic pollution. Although, due to ecobricks being a relatively new solution to plastic pollution, studies are still taking place to determine if ecobricks will continue to be a solution in the long run. Ecobricks are not a solution to get rid of plastic waste. They simply extend the life of already used plastic in a way that is beneficial to environments that are affected the most.

== The ecobricking of plastic ==
The ecobricking movement has emerged from a growing awareness of the scale of plastic pollution, the problems it causes and the inability of industrial means to adequately manage plastic waste The ecobricking movement promotes techniques, methodologies and applications for households, communities and cities to take responsibility for their plastic. Ecobricks serve to sequester plastic, to use the local plastic as building blocks, and as an alternative medium of community exchange

=== Terminal minimization of net surface area ===
By packing plastic into a bottle, flat high-surface area wrappers and films are compressed together. This terminal minimization of net surface area means that the plastic is secured from the principal forms of potential degradation: heat, burning, friction and photo-degradation. In addition, by ensuring that only clean and dry plastic is packed and permanently sealing the bottle, potential microbial degradation is also prevented.

=== Sequestration of plastic ===
When ecobricks are properly made and properly applied in cradle to cradle design constructions they result in the effective plastic sequestration, of plastic out of the biosphere. In other words, ecobricks serve as a way to trap and secure plastic from entering the environment, degrading and causing ecological harm. In short-term ecobrick applications, such as milstein or Dieleman Modules ecobricks can be used for up to three years without any damage to the bottle. By using silicone sealant or inner-tube-bands as short-term, non-permanent attachment methods, the ecobricks can be extricated undamaged at the construction's end and used again in another short or long-term applications. In particular, the long-term earth and ecobrick building method, results in gardens, parks, and earthen walls that ensure that the ecobricked plastic is fully secured. Earthen mortar will easily crumble when the structure is disassembled ensuring that the ecobricks can be extricated and reused. Earthen mortar also completely covers the ecobrick negating any possibility of heat, friction, fire or microbial degradation. Ecobrick sequestration thus prevents the breakdown of the contained plastic into micro-plastics. The sequestration also prevents the incineration of the plastic and the release of gases and CO_{2}. It is estimated that for each 1 kg of ecobricked plastic, 3.1 kg of CO_{2} is sequestered.

=== The raising of ecological consciousness ===
In contrast to industrial plastic management technologies, ecobricking directly involves the consumers of plastic in its process. The process of saving, segregating, washing, drying and packing plastic results in consumer/ecobricker reflection. The meditative and communal tendencies of ecobricking raise individual and collective 'ecological consciousness' over time. Ecobrickers tend to pursue more information about waste disposal in their community, plastic, recycling and ecobricking topics. This leads to a steady decrease in the ecobricker's net plastic consumption.

== Ecobrick building applications ==
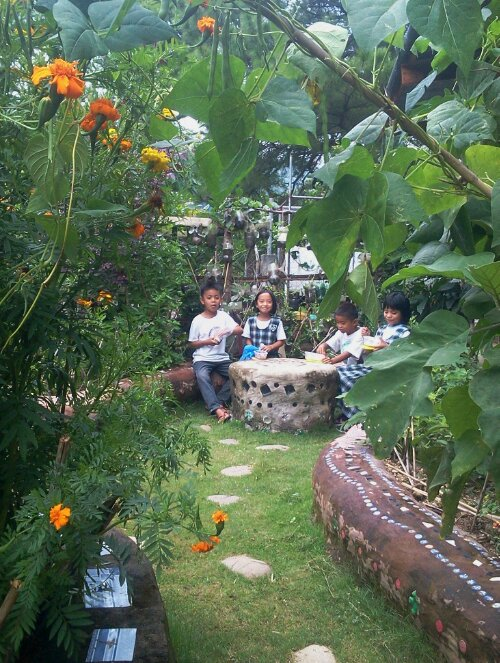
Ecobricks can be used to build community garden spaces.

Ecobricks can be connected using tire bands, silicone, cob, and cement to build furniture, gardens, structures and more. Ecobricks are being used in different ways around the world. Ideally, ecobrick constructions use cradle to cradle design methods of combining the bottles—ensuring that the ecobricks can be extricated without compromise to the bottle at the end of the construction's life span. It is useful to differentiate between short-term ecobrick and long term ecobrick applications

=== Short-term applications ===
Eco bricks can be combined together using tire bands or inner-tube-bands as short-term, non-permanent attachment methods to create applications that last months to several years. As short-term applications are not usually covered, such constructions are typically for indoor use, in order to prevent UV photodegration of the bottles. Short-term applications range from:

- Eco brick Milstein Modules: Hexagon and triangle modules that are used for sitting, but can be combined together to form one or two level horizontal surfaces. Applications include tables, beds, stages, etc.
- Eco brick Dieleman Modules: A geometric configuration of 16 eco bricks that enables a stackable LEGO module. These modules can be stacked horizontally and vertically indefinitely. Applications include indoor playgrounds, temporary stalls, sheds, and circular structure.
- Eco brick Open Spaces: A combination of hundreds of Milstein and Dieleman lego modules that enable the creation of interactive social spaces.

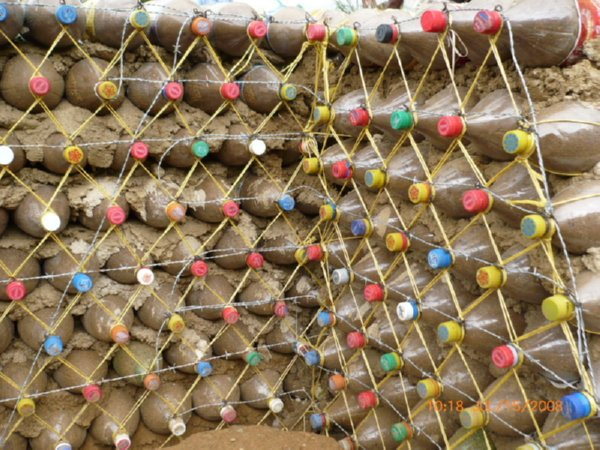
Eco-brick Wall

=== Long-term applications ===
Ecobricks can be used with Earth building techniques (i.e. cob, wattle and daub, and adobe) to create structures that can last years or decades. In this way, Earth mixes are used in between horizontally laid ecobricks as mortar. Ecobricks can also be used vertically and with traditional construction techniques in the Pura Vida Atlan style of building. Both methods are careful to avoid the complete covering of ecobricks with cement which upon the end of the construction results in the destruction of ecobricks upon extrication. Examples of long-term ecobrick applications include:

- Raised gardens: Ecobricks are laid horizontal and completely covered
- Raised benches: Two or three levels of horizontally laid ecobricks to make seats and benches.
- Food Forest Play Parks: A combination of raised beds and benches to make a public green space, ideally filled with edible plants.
- Walls: Ecobricks can be laid horizontal with earth mortar to build vertical walls. The walls can between standing posts and beams or as a circular standing structure. Alternatively, the pura vida method, uses chicken wire between posts to make walls from enclosed vertically standing ecobricks.

== History ==
The packing of plastic into bottles to sequester plastic and to make building blocks has arisen independently in locations around the world as a local solution to plastic pollution. Filling bottles with plastic waste builds upon the bottle building techniques of German architect Andreas Froese (using sand-filled PET bottles) in South America in 2000. Alvaro Molina began packing plastic into bottles on the island of Ometepe in 2003. Susana Heisse, in Guatemala began to encourage ecobricking in 2003 as a building technique and for solving plastic pollution challenges faced in Lake Atitlan communities.

In 2010, in the Northern Philippines, Russell Maier and Irene Bakisan developed a curriculum guide of simplified and recommended practices to help local schools integrate eco-bricks into their curriculum. Applying the ancestral ecological principles of the Igorots for building rice terraces, they integrated cradle-to-cradle principles into ecobrick methodology: ensuring that ecobricks can be reused at the end of the construction they are used in. Through the Department of Education, the guide was distributed to 1,700 schools in 2014.

Movements in South Africa began in 2012, when Joseph Stodgel brought the concept to Greyton, throwing an annual Trash to Treasure festival at the local dumpsite with South African, Candice Mostert, who started local school projects under Greyton transition town building with the bricks made by the community. The movement has since grown in South Africa, with organizations like Waste-ED, founded by Candice Mostert, who works both in Zambia and Cape Towns surrounds to educate people about plastic and its value, and the architect Ian Dommisse as the Ecobrick Exchange.

== Case studies ==
1. In the village of Besao in the Northern Philippines, hospital custodian Jane Liwan set about packing one ecobrick a day to revamp her ailing home that her neighbors had been ridiculing. Two years later her home is a tourist attraction that has been featured in both local and national media.
2. On the isolated volcano island of Ometepe in Lake Nicaragua, Alvaro Molina, distraught by the plastic waste that had nowhere to go in his community, began eco bricking at his hotel. His community is now one of the cleanest in the country, with dozens of local schools building with ecobricks and a micro-economy formed around ecobrick buying and selling.
3. In New Mexico, USA, Jo Stodgel has run a community ecobrick project since 2014 through his organization Upcycle Santa Fe. The organization conducts regular ecobrick river cleanups, has built a number of structures at local schools, and also completed an important research project with Los Alamos National Laboratory regarding the offgassing of ecobricks. His organization also encourages the usage of milk cartons as well as bottles to make ecobricks.
4. In Pune, India a community called Pune Ploggers is making ecobricks out of plastic collected in waste bins. Infrastructure support for the underprivileged communities is the purpose these bricks will serve in alignment to collaborate multiple SDGs.
