= Concrete recycling =

Re-use of rubble from demolished concrete structures

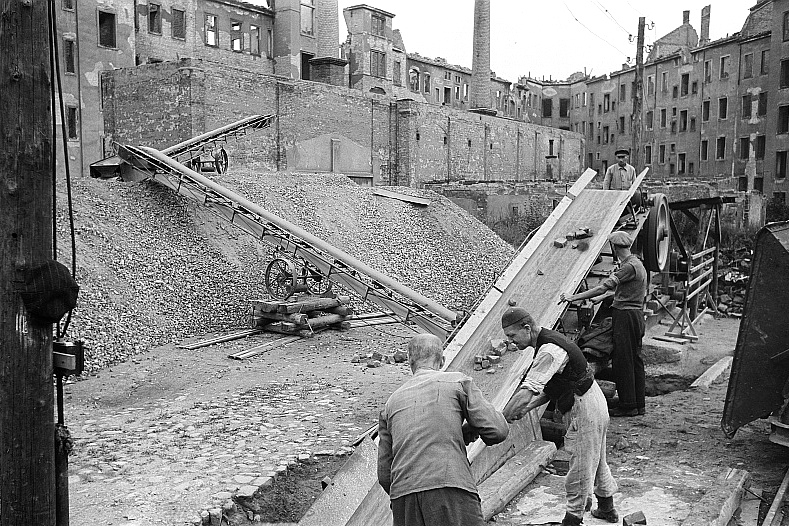
Concrete from a building being sent to a portable crusher. This is the first step in recycling concrete.

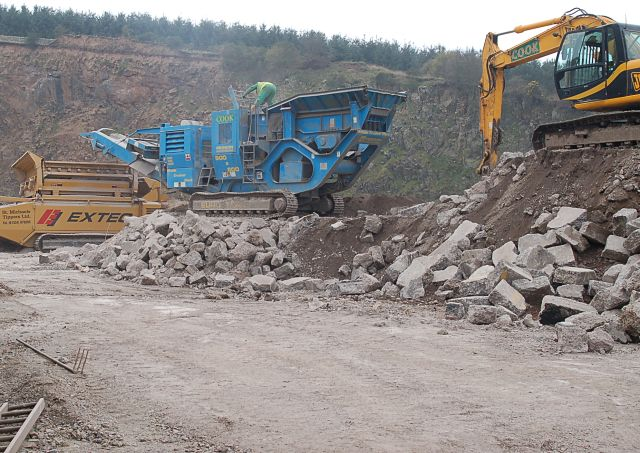
Crushing concrete from an airfield

Concrete recycling is the use of rubble from demolished concrete structures. Recycling is cheaper and more ecological than trucking rubble to a landfill. Crushed rubble can be used for road gravel, revetments, retaining walls, landscaping gravel, or raw material for new concrete. Large pieces can be used as bricks or slabs, or incorporated with new concrete into structures, a material called urbanite.

== Circular economy ==
Concrete is a durable construction material. However, changes in human needs can lead to the generation of concrete waste, even from well-designed structures.

Concrete may be considered waste according to the European Commission decision of 2014/955/EU for the List of Waste under the codes: 17 (construction and demolition wastes, including excavated soil from contaminated sites) 01 (concrete, bricks, tiles and ceramics), 01 (concrete), and 17.01.06* (mixtures of, separate fractions of concrete, bricks, tiles and ceramics containing hazardous substances), and 17.01.07 (mixtures of, separate fractions of concrete, bricks, tiles and ceramics other than those mentioned in 17.01.06). It is estimated that in 2018 the European Union generated 371,910 thousand tons of mineral waste from construction and demolition, and close to 4% of this quantity is considered hazardous. Germany, France and the United Kingdom were the top three polluters with 86,412 thousand tons, 68,976 and 68,732 thousand tons of construction waste generation, respectively.

In the context of a circular economy the most efficient way to use concrete after fulfilling its initial purpose may not be clear. Factors to be considered include the quality of the recovered material as well as technical or other regulatory requirements.

Currently, there is not an End-of-Waste criteria for concrete materials in the European Union. However, different sectors have been proposing alternatives for concrete waste and re purposing it as a secondary raw material in various applications, including concrete manufacturing itself.

=== Reuse ===
Reuse of blocks in original form, or by cutting into smaller blocks, has even less environmental impact; however, a limited market now exists. Improved building designs that allow for slab reuse and building transformation without demolition could increase this use. Hollow core concrete slabs are easy to dismantle and the span is normally constant, making them good for reuse.

Other cases of re-use are possible with pre-cast concrete pieces: through selective demolition, such pieces can be disassembled and collected for further use in other building sites. Studies show that back-building and remounting plans for building units (i.e., re-use of pre-fabricated concrete) is an alternative for a kind of construction which protects resources and saves energy. Especially long-living, durable, energy-intensive building materials, such as concrete, can be kept in the life-cycle longer through recycling. Prefabricated constructions are the prerequisites for constructions necessarily capable of being taken apart. In the case of optimal application in the building carcass, savings in costs are estimated in 26%, a lucrative complement to new building methods. However, this depends on several courses to be set. The viability of this alternative still needs to be studied, as the logistics associated with transporting heavy pieces of concrete could have a negative impact on the operation, both in terms of cost and carbon footprint. Also, ever changing regulations on new buildings worldwide may require higher quality standards for construction elements and inhibit the use of old elements which may be classified as obsolete.

=== Recycling ===
Concrete debris is routinely shipped to landfills for disposal, but recycling is increasing due to improved environmental awareness, changing regulation/laws and economic benefits. Concrete can be recovered – crushed and reused as aggregate in new projects.

Recovering concrete reduces resource exploitation and associated transport costs, and reduces landfill. However, it has little impact on reducing greenhouse gas emissions as most emissions occur when cement is made. At present, most recovered concrete is used for road sub-base and civil engineering projects.

By far the most common method for recycling dry and hardened concrete involves crushing. The input material can be returned concrete which is still fresh (wet), from ready-mix trucks, production waste at a pre-cast production facility, or waste from demolition. The most significant source is demolition waste, preferably pre-sorted post-demolition. Specific processing sites are typically able to produce higher quality aggregate. Screens are used to achieve desired particle size, and remove dirt, foreign particles and fine material from the coarse aggregate.

The final product, Recycled Concrete Aggregate (RCA), has an angular shape, rougher surface, lower specific gravity (20%), higher water absorption, and pH greater than 11 – this elevated pH increases the risk of alkali reactions. RCA's lower density usually increases project efficiency and lowers job cost – RCA yields more volume by weight (up to 15%). The physical properties make it the preferred material for applications such as road base and sub-base. This is because recycled aggregates often have better compaction properties and require less cement for sub-base uses. Furthermore, it is generally cheaper to obtain than virgin material.

Research indicates that high replacement ratios of recycled concrete aggregate (RCA)—up to 100%—can be incorporated into structural mixtures such as self-compacting concrete without causing a proportional loss of durability, provided that mixture designs maintain a constant water-to-cement ratio and adjust superplasticizer dosages to preserve workability. While incorporating RCA leads to a moderate increase in the carbonation rate and introduces greater microstructural heterogeneity due to adhered mortar, it does not drastically impair the electrical resistivity of the pore network. Furthermore, chloride transport exhibits a regime-dependent response, showing favorable non-steady-state behavior with lower diffusion coefficients and longer passage times, alongside slower low-pressure surface water uptake compared to conventional aggregate mixtures.

==== Cement ====
Pulverized concrete can replace flux material in electric arc furnaces. The process produces “reactivated cement” as a byproduct. Furnaces need flux (typically lime), to purify the steel. If the leftover slag is cooled quickly in air, it becomes Portland cement. The technique also significantly reduces CO_{2} emissions compared to conventional methods.

=== Cradle-to-cradle challenges ===
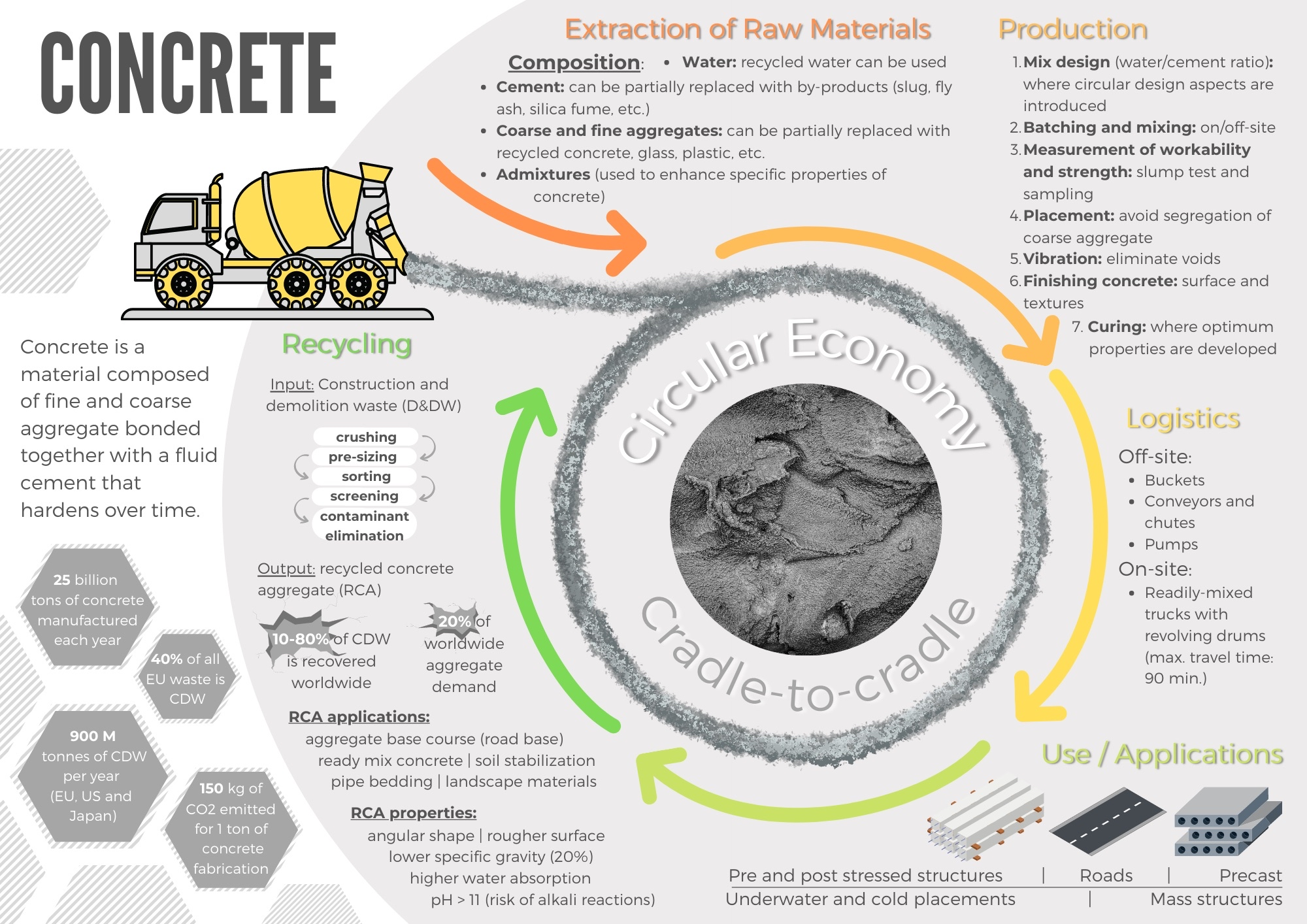
Circularity of Concrete: Cradle-to-Cradle design

The applications developed for RCA so far are not exhaustive, and many more uses are to be developed as regulations, institutions and norms find ways to accommodate construction and demolition waste as secondary raw materials in a safe and economic way. However, considering the purpose of having a circularity of resources in the concrete life cycle, the only application of RCA that could be considered as recycling of concrete is the replacement of natural aggregates on concrete mixes. All the other applications would fall under the category of downcycling. It is estimated that even near complete recovery of concrete from construction and demolition waste will only supply about 20% of total aggregate needs in the developed world.

The path towards circularity goes beyond concrete technology itself, depending on multilateral advances in the cement industry, research and development of alternative materials, building design and management, and demolition as well as conscious use of spaces in urban areas to reduce consumption.

== Process ==
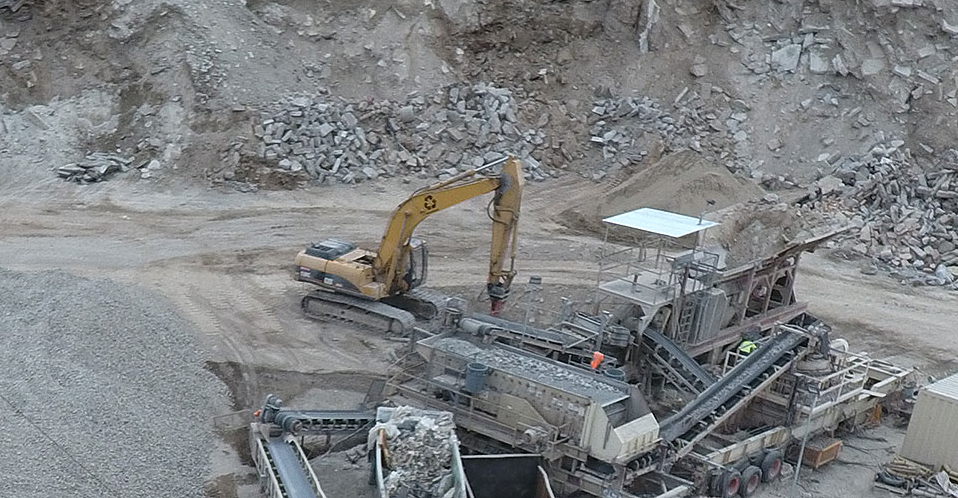
A concrete recycling plant

Re-purposing urbanite (concrete rubble pieces) involves selecting and transporting the pieces, and using them as slabs or bricks. The pieces can be shaped, for example using a chisel; this can be labor-intensive.

Crushing involves removing trash, wood and paper; removing metals such as rebar, using magnets and other devices, to be recycled separately; sorting the aggregate by size; crushing it using a crushing machine; and removing other particulates by methods such as hand-picking and water flotation.

Crushing at the construction site using portable crushers is cheaper and causes less pollution than transporting material to and from a quarry. Large road-portable plants can crush concrete and asphalt rubble at 600 tons per hour. These systems normally include a side discharge conveyor, a screening plant, and a return conveyor from the screen back to the crusher for re-crushing large chunks. Compact, self-contained crushers can crush up to 150 tons per hour and fit into tighter areas. Crusher attachments to construction equipment such as excavators can crush up to 100 tons per hour and make crushing of smaller volumes economical.

To produce clean aggregates from crushed concrete waste, very careful dismantling and demolishing is needed to keep the concrete stream away from other materials that would diminish its quality. Once separated, the broken concrete is then sent to a wet recycling process, where the coarse fraction of broken concrete is washed to produce clean aggregate, whereas the residue generated from the washing process is sent to landfill in the form of sludge.

== Uses ==
Large pieces of concrete rubble (urbanite) can be used in walls as building stones, as slabs in walkways, or as riprap revetments to reduce stream bank erosion. Ecology blocks (eco-blocks) are made from recycled concrete and used for retaining walls and other temporary structures, and have also been used for hostile architecture.

Small pieces are used as gravel for new construction projects. Sub-base gravel is laid as the lowest layer in a road, with fresh concrete or asphalt poured over it. The US Federal Highway Administration may use such techniques to build new highways from the materials of old highways. Concrete pavements can be broken in place and used as a base layer for an asphalt pavement through a process called rubblization.

Crushed concrete free of contaminants can be used as raw material (sometimes mixed with natural aggregate) to make new concrete.

Well-graded and aesthetically pleasing materials can be used as landscaping stone and mulch.

The main commercial applications are:

- Aggregate base course (road base), or the untreated aggregates used as foundation for roadway pavement, is the underlying layer (under pavement) which provides a structural foundation for paving.
- Aggregate for ready-mix concrete, by replacing from 10 to 45% of the virgin aggregates with a blend of cement, sand and water. Because the RCA contains cement, the ratios of the mix have to be adjusted to achieve desired structural requirements such as workability, strength and water absorption.
- Soil stabilization, with the incorporation of recycled aggregate, lime, or fly ash into marginal quality subgrade material used to enhance the load bearing capacity of that subgrade.
- Pipe bedding: serving as a stable bed or firm foundation in which to lay underground utilities. Some countries' regulations prohibit the use of RCA and other construction and demolition wastes in filtration and drainage beds due to potential contamination with chromium and due to pH impacts.
- Landscape materials: Includes boulder/stacked rock walls, underpass abutment structures, erosion structures, water features, retaining walls.

== Chemical recycling of concrete waste ==
=== Soil amendment and stabilization ===
Improper disposal and treatment of concrete waste negatively affect soil, but proper treatment and recycling processes can be used to amend and stabilize soil. In general, alkali-activated mixtures improve and stabilize soil through cation exchange, hydration reactions, and enhanced pozzolanic reactions. Ca^{2+} ions in an alkali-activated mixture exchanges with other metal ions, decreasing electric double layers and increasing flocculation, making soil more granular and friable. Alkali-activated mixtures improve soil by absorbing the water in the soil through hydration reactions, which decreases the water content in the soil and improves soft soil with a high moisture content. Finally, the dissociation of calcium oxide in water in the soil increases electrolyte concentrations and pH, and hence SiO_{2} and Al_{2}O_{3} dissolve more readily and promotes pozzolanic reactions. Materials such as portland cement, fly ash, and lime are already used extensively to amend and stabilize soil, so the same concept can be extended to concrete waste, which is itself an alkali-activated mixture. In general, studies have shown that the cementitious material of concrete waste that is added to weak soil causes hydration reactions that increase the soil pH, amount of Ca^{2+}, and amount of free Ca(OH)_{2} that could react with SiO_{2} and Al_{2}O_{3} through pozzolanic reactions that can improve soil.

=== Construction material production ===
Concrete waste contains abundant silicon and some aluminum, so they can be used to synthesize geopolymers. Geopolymeric binder combined with metakaolin can yield material with desired silicon, aluminum, and calcium contents. Geopolymer concrete from waste concrete has been analyzed, and it has been suggested that it could be used in applications that require moderately strong concrete, thermally insulating concrete, lightweight concrete, and bricks or blocks.

=== Water and gas treatment ===
Concrete waste that is rich in alkaline calcium compounds can be used to remove and recover various elements from an aqueous solution. Waste concrete has been used as a sorbent to remove phosphorus from wastewater after the removal of excess sludge in sewage treatment plants. Concrete waste may also be used as an inexpensive gas treatment agent. This would offer advantages over using conventional gas treatment agents because concrete waste is cheap and produced in large amounts. Research has shown that waste concrete can contribute to the sorption of NO_{2}, SO_{2}, and fluorine gas.

== Precautions ==
There have been concerns about the recycling of painted concrete due to possible lead content. The US Army Corps of Engineers' Construction Engineering Research Laboratory (CERL) and others have studied the risks, and concluded that concrete with lead-based paint should be safely used as fill without an impervious cover as long as it is covered by soil.

Some experiments showed that recycled concrete is less strong and durable than concrete from natural aggregate. This can be remedied by mixing in materials such as fly ash.
