= Colonne di Giugliano =

Monumental complex in Italy

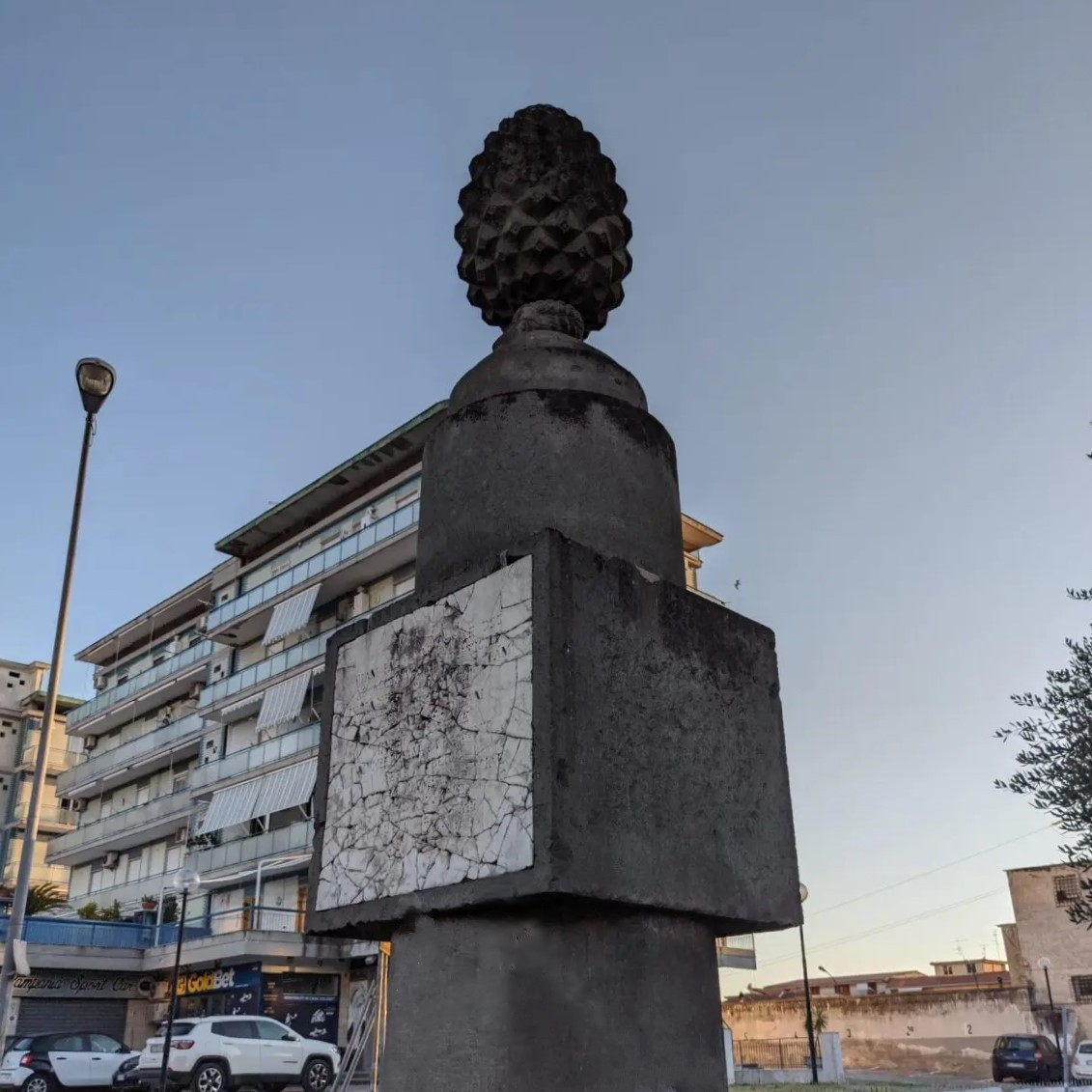
- Detail of the southern column
- Artist: Antonio Niccolini
- Year: 1842–1850
- Type: Sculpture
- Medium: Piperno
- Dimensions: 400 cm (160 in)
- Location: Melito di Napoli; 40.92855321927541°N 14.225217194019946°E

The Colonne di Giugliano (literally "Columns of Giugliano") are a monumental complex located on the border between Giugliano in Campania and Melito di Napoli, in the Metropolitan City of Naples. They are among the most recognisable landmarks of the area.

== History ==
=== Origins ===
The columns are located at the entrance to Via Colonne, an extension of Corso Campano, which takes its name from the Via Campana that connected Puteoli (modern Pozzuoli) with Capua, crossing several territories such as Quarto, Qualiano, Giugliano, Aversa and Teverola. This Roman road remained in use for centuries, largely preserving its original route until the Bourbon period, when, during reconstruction works near Qualiano, the new road was diverted eastwards towards the centre of Giugliano and Melito di Napoli, eventually reaching the former strada Regia, later designated as the S.S. 7 bis, at whose junction the columns were built as a gateway to the new road and to Giugliano.

=== Bourbon reconstruction ===
The columns date to the Bourbon period and were erected as part of the infrastructure modernisation programme promoted by Ferdinand II of the Two Sicilies. During his reign (1830–1859), the king launched an extensive road network reorganisation programme to provide Campania with modern infrastructure, with the aim of supporting economic development and modernising areas close to the capital.

In 1842, the complete reconstruction of the Via Campana began, and works were completed in 1850. The road, partly following the ancient route, was widened, modernised and partially paved with durable vesuvian basalt. The infrastructure withstood the passage of armoured vehicles during World War II, as shown in footage in which the columns are visible.

To mark the completion of this engineering work, the "gateway of Giugliano" was symbolically defined by two monumental columns featuring commemorative plaques describing the history of the road and celebrating the new construction.

The columns were likely designed by the architect Antonio Niccolini, also known for the design of the Capodimonte stairs and for the renovation of the Teatro di San Carlo in Naples.

== Description ==
The complex consists of two Piperno columns arranged symmetrically at the entrance to the city.

The columns are approximately 4 metres (13 ft) high and rest on quadrangular bases. A distinctive feature is the presence of carved pine cones, a recurring motif in Bourbon works symbolising prosperity, knowledge and moral elevation. A similar element can also be found in front of the Teatro San Carlo in Naples, another work associated with the same architect.

Originally, the columns were equipped with two commemorative plaques: one disappeared around the 1960s, while the other, although damaged and barely legible, is still present.

Inscription on the plaque: VIAM PASSVVM FERME DCC AB ACCESSV OLIM DIFFICILI IVLIANENSES COMPLANATAM PROMPTIOREMQVE VTRIMQVE PERDITAM QVADRATO SILICE MVNIENDAM CVRARVNT CAPVTQUE CAMPANIAE VIAE AERE PVBLICO PRIMO NOMINE PLACVIT DECLARARI MDCCCXLII

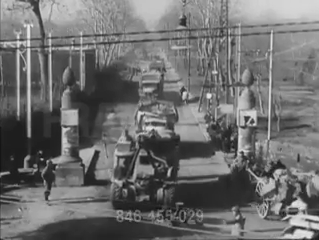
A convoy of heavy Allied (Anglo-American) Fifth Army military vehicles passing through the 'Columns of Giugliano', advancing northwards following the liberation of Giugliano in Campania from Nazi forces. October 6, 1943.

== Location and conservation ==
It is notable that, despite the name, the columns are not located within the administrative territory of Giugliano, but in that of nearby Melito di Napoli. What was once "a road in the middle of cultivated fields" has since been surrounded by buildings, shopping centres and warehouses, reflecting the rapid urbanisation of the area after the 1970s.

Over time, the columns have suffered damage caused by pollution and weathering. In the 1990s, the bases of the columns were partially cut. The monument continues to face deterioration due to graffiti, illegal billposting and limited maintenance of the surrounding area.
