= Francesco Antonio Camuncoli =

Italian painter

Francesco Antonio Camuncoli (30 April 1745 – 18, November 1825) was an Italian painter of the Neoclassical style.

== Biography ==
He was born in Novellara, but was most active in Reggio Emilia He first studied at the Jesuit school in Novellara. He became orphan of both parents by 1756, and his uncles sent him to study painting and design at a Seminary in Reggio. In 1763 he began studies at the Accademia Clementina of Bologna, where he studied under Lavagna, and was influenced by Francesco Vellani. He returned to Reggio in 1770, mainly painting mythologic themes on canvas and religious altarpieces. He painted some frescoes for the City Cemetery of Condera in Reggio Emilia. From 1797 to 1825, he worked as professor at the Fine Arts Academy of Reggio. Among his pupils were Prospero Minghetti, Francesco Segnani, Giovanni Rocca Ciamberlano.

== Works ==
- Blessed Virgin of the Ghiara with Saints Prospero of Reggio and Anthony Abbott, fresco from the Cemetery of Reggio;
- Virgin with Saint Anne and others, Basilica San Prospero, Reggio
- Portrait of the priest Denti, Musei Civici of Reggio Emilia.
