= Palazzo Tirelli =

Palazzo Tirelli may refer to:

- Palazzo Tirelli, Parma, Renaissance-style urban palace in Parma, Italy
- Palazzo Tirelli, Reggio Emilia, former aristocratic palace in Reggio Emilia, Italy
