= Palazzo Pinelli, Giugliano =

Palazzo Pinelli
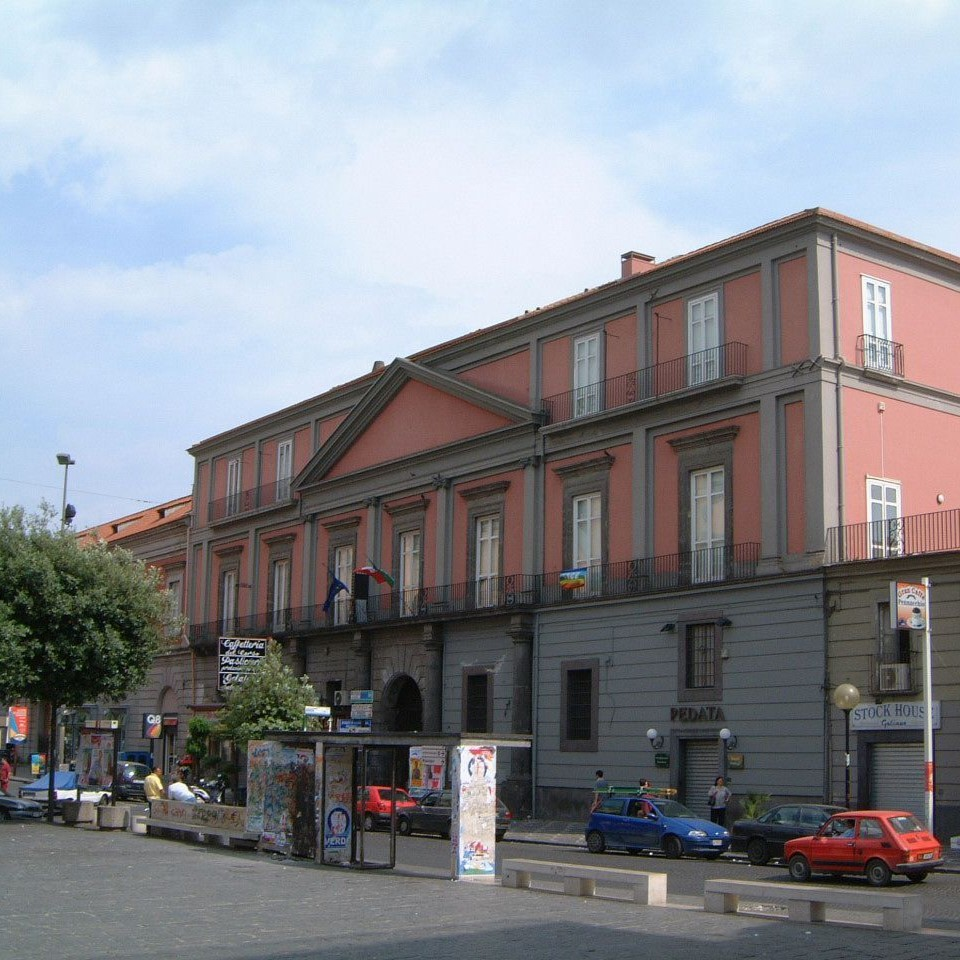
- Interactive map of the Palazzo Pinelli area

General information
- Status: In use
- Type: Palace
- Architectural style: Renaissance architecture
- Location: Corso Campano, 134, Giugliano in Campania, Italy
- Coordinates: 40.92843867394237°N 14.20400694496452°E
- Completed: 16th century

Design and construction
- Architect: Giovanni Francesco Di Palma

Palazzo Pinelli, also known as Palazzo Palumbo or Palazzo Baronale, is a Renaissance palace located in Giugliano in Campania, in the Metropolitan City of Naples, Italy. Originally conceived as a fortified palace with defensive towers, the building underwent numerous transformations over the centuries, which altered the original design by Giovan Francesco De Palma, known as Mormando, as well as causing the near total disappearance of its gardens. The palace currently hosts conferences and performances. In 2019, it hosted the augmented reality museum dedicated to Giambattista Basile.

== History ==
The palace was commissioned in 1545 by Cosimo Pinelli, banker, Duke of Acerenza and lord of the Giugliano fiefdom. The design is attributed to Giovan Francesco De Palma, known as Mormando, a Neapolitan architect and pupil of Giovanni Francesco Donadio, also known as Mormando, whose daughter Diana he married. Construction was completed around 1569.

Coat of arms of the Pinelli family

In 1631, under the feudal lord Galeazzo Francesco Pinelli, grandson of Cosimo, the writer Giambattista Basile was appointed governor of Giugliano and resided in the palace. It is believed that Basile, a member of the Accademia degli Oziosi founded in 1611 by Giovanni Battista Manso, worked in the rooms of the piano nobile on his most famous work, Lo cunto de li cunti, a collection of tales that later inspired authors such as Charles Perrault and the Brothers Grimm for fairy tales including Cinderella, Puss in Boots, and Sleeping Beauty.

The palace also housed the renowned private library of Gian Vincenzo Pinelli.

In 1639, Galeazzo Francesco Pinelli sold his shares of the fiefdom and palace to Cesare d'Aquino. In 1691, ownership passed to Francesco Grillo, Duke of Giugliano. Following the death without heirs of Duke Domenico Grillo in 1756, the ducal palace and other family assets were confiscated by the royal treasury. The palace then became the residence of the royal administrator Antonio Tito. Around 1794, it was acquired by Marcantonio Colonna, Prince of Stigliano and new feudal lord of Giugliano. An important figure at the Bourbon court and Viceroy of Sicily from 1774, he commissioned a radical renovation of the building around 1794.

In 1833, the palace was expropriated for the benefit of the Palumbo family, from whom the alternative name derives.

=== Historical transformations ===
During the ownership of the Colonna princes of Stigliano, the palace underwent major modifications. Beginning in 1794, Marcantonio Colonna commissioned architect Domenico Chelli, then director of the Teatro di San Carlo, to carry out a radical renovation. The project included the refurbishment of the interiors in the Pompeian style and the construction of monumental gardens accessed through a still extant Baroque staircase.

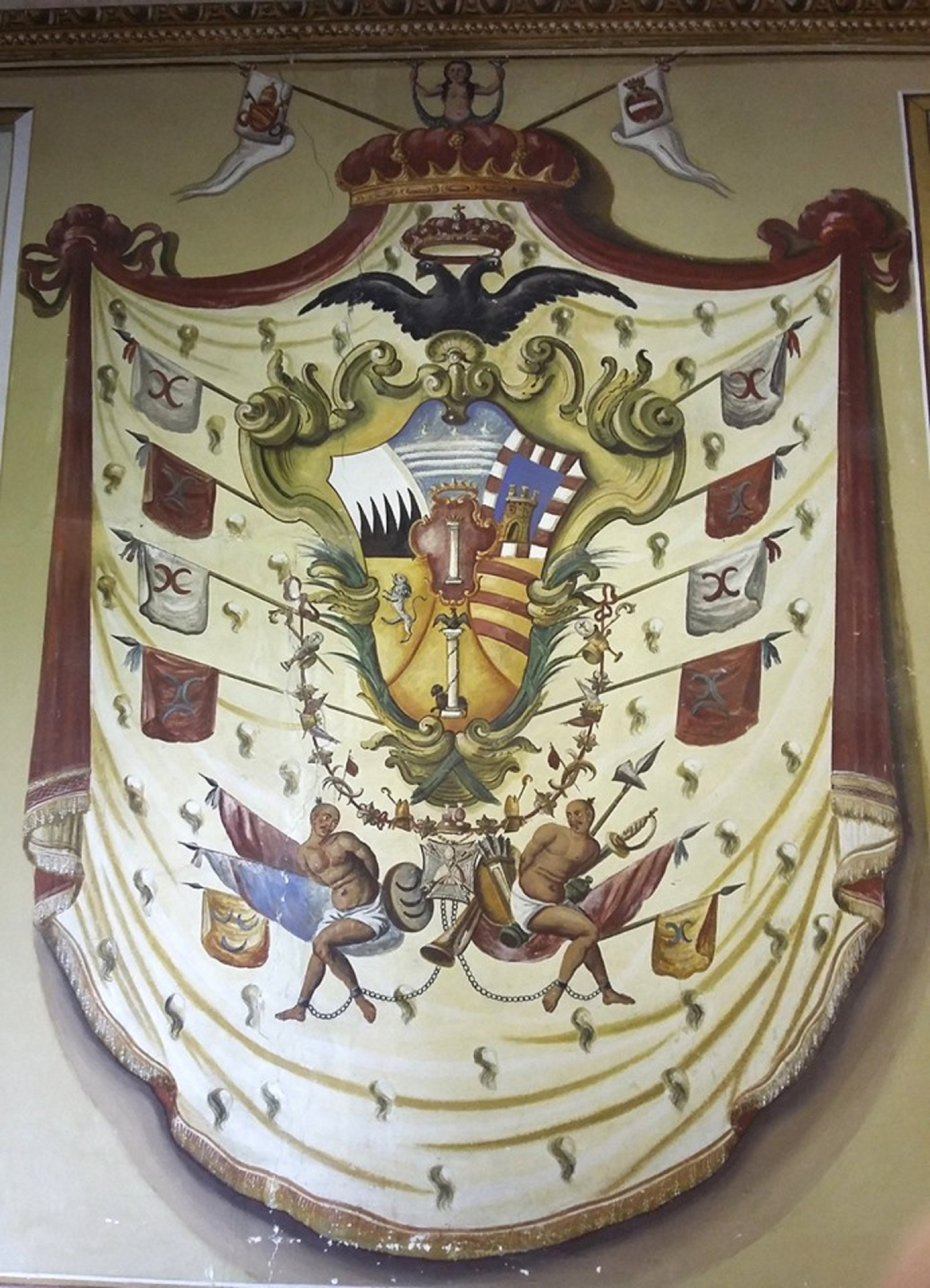
Frescoed coat of arms of the Colonna family

The Colonna family enriched the complex with numerous embellishments, documented in the Dizionario geografico-istorico-fisico del Regno di Napoli (1796) by Francesco Sacco and the Memorie istoriche della terra di Giugliano (1800) by Agostino Basile. These included:

- A private chapel containing the entire body of Saint Felician Martyr, transferred to Giugliano at the request of the family, and still preserved there today.
- A private theatre inside the palace
- A "pleasant Trappa" featuring wax images of Trappists, depicted both seated in the refectory and in prayer
- A large garden decorated with statues and perspectives, including a statue of the goddess Ceres (Note: Brought from Rome.) and a sculptural group depicting Polyphemus, Acis and Galatea
- A maze with a "magnificent Chinese-style room" at its centre

These features constituted an exceptional example of an eighteenth-century noble villa, combining architectural, artistic and landscape elements according to the taste of the period.

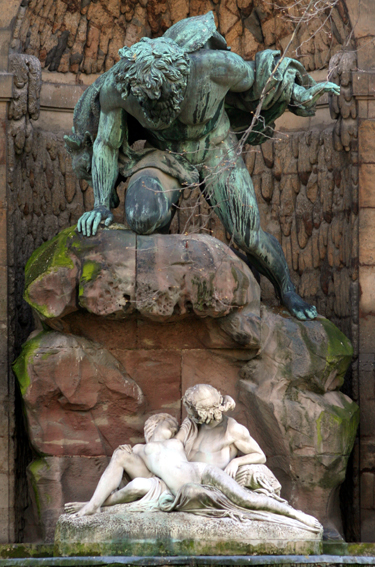
Example of a sculpture depicting Polyphemus with Acis and Galatea, at the Jardin du Luxembourg

==== 20th-century and contemporary transformations ====
In the 1960s, before the enactment of the 1967 Italian urban planning law, the gardens were almost completely covered with concrete through the construction of apartment blocks, and the fortress tower on the left side of the courtyard was later demolished to create flats. The busts that crowned the four columns at the entrance to the garden also disappeared.

In the 1990s, one wing of the palace was restored at the request of members of the Palumbo family, under the direction of engineer Pasquale Basile.

The building survives in fair overall condition, although only fragments of the original gardens remain.

In 2025, following an accident, one of the four stone bollards placed at the entrance gate of the palace was broken.

== Description ==
Originally conceived as a fortified palace with defensive towers, the building has a regular three-wing plan arranged around a large central courtyard and features its main façade facing Piazza del Mercato along Corso Campano.

The arrangement around a central courtyard derives from classical planimetric models and became a defining feature of this architectural typology, consisting of an enclosed complex organised around a courtyard, with small openings on the ground floor and regular larger windows on the upper levels.

The façade, an example of the Neapolitan Renaissance, is tripartite according to the classical scheme of base, body and crown. The ground floor is clad in horizontal bands of grey Piperno. The façade is articulated by four Doric pilaster-columns in piperno supporting a projecting cornice running along the façade near the first floor level. The entrance portal is centrally placed within the rusticated masonry. The second and third levels feature smooth plastered surfaces in dark red, with projecting grey structural frames. At the centre of the composition, near the third level, is a decorative triangular pediment occupying three bays and supported by four Ionic pilasters; these correspond to the ground-floor pilasters described above

The building reflects the style of the Neapolitan Renaissance, introduced almost a century earlier under Alfonso V of Aragon, characterised by monumental forms and extensive use of piperno decoration on façades. Unlike the more restrained Florentine Renaissance, the Neapolitan style developed through Mediterranean cultural exchanges involving the territories of the Crown of Aragon. The presence of Catalan and Spanish artists in Naples, including Pisanello and Colantonio, together with later artistic influences from Florence following the alliance with the Medici, contributed to the development of this distinctive style. Di Palma's architecture represented a simplified interpretation of the models established by his master.

== Bibliography ==
- Basile, Agostino (1800). Memorie istoriche della terra di Giugliano. Naples. pp. 36–40.
- Sacco, Francesco (1796). Dizionario geografico-istorico-fisico del Regno di Napoli. Vol. 2. Naples. pp. 95–96.

== See also ==
- Giugliano in Campania
- Giambattista Basile
