= National Museum of Ceramics, Naples =

Museo Nazionale della Ceramica Duca di Martina
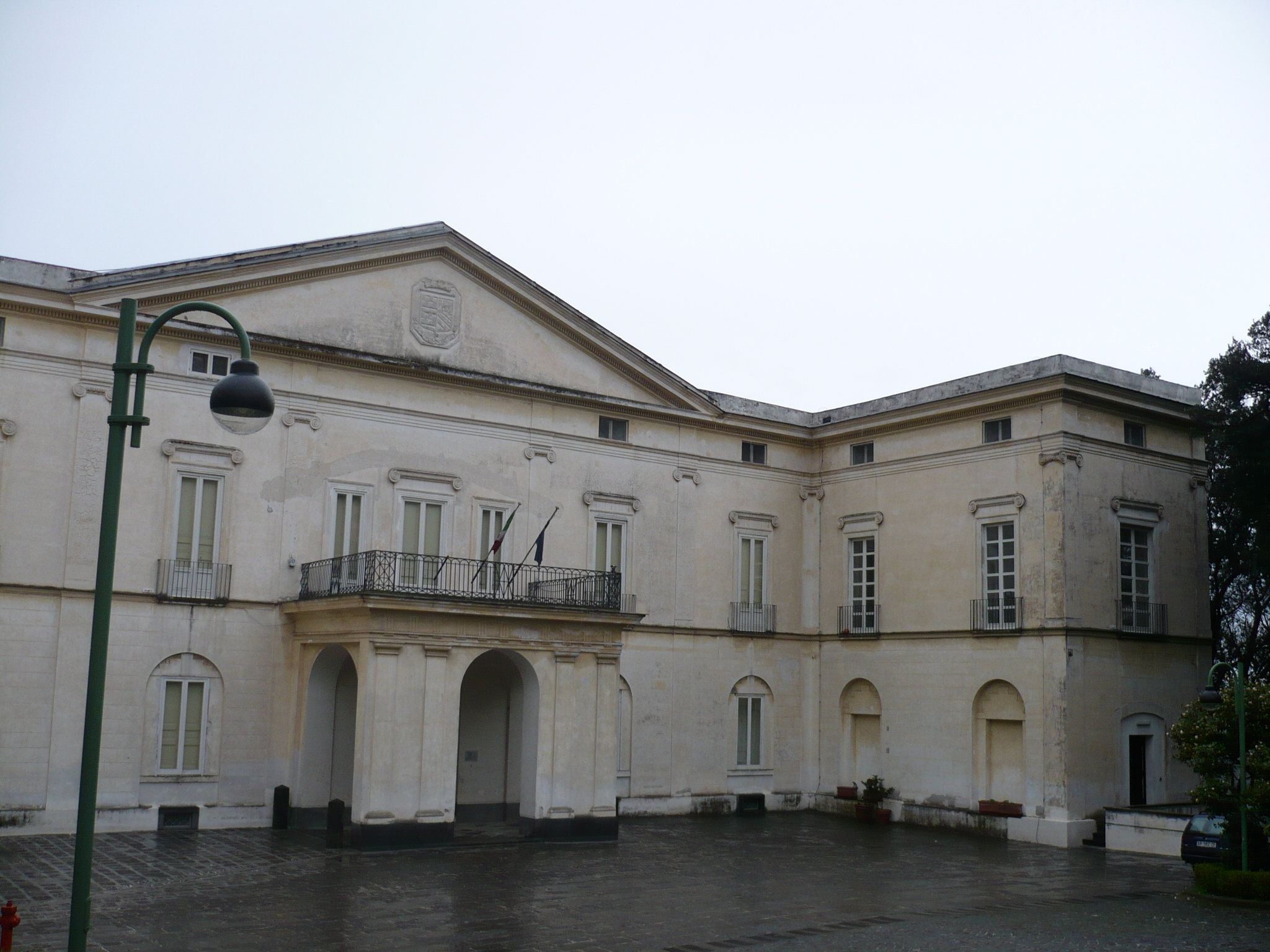
- Established: 1927
- Location: Naples
- Coordinates: 40.8395°N 14.2300°E
- Type: Ceramics
- Visitors: 20661
- Director: Luisa Ambrosio
- Website: www.beniculturali.it/luogo/museo-della-ceramica-duca-di-martina-in-villa-floridiana

The National Museum of Ceramics Duca Di Martina (Italian: Museo nazionale della ceramica “duca di Martina”) is a historical and artistic site situated inside of the Villa Floridiana Park (Parco di Villa Floridiana) in Naples, Italy. The building used to be one of Campania’s Bourbon royal residences and since 1927 this residence has hosted the museum.

== History ==
In 1815, Ferdinand IV of Bourbon bought for his wife Lucia Migliaccio, duchess of Floridia, the mansion of the Prince Giuseppe Caracciolo di Torella on the hill of Vomero. In her honour the villa was called after her Flordiana.

Over time, the King bought more land around the original mansion and the architect Antonio Niccolini was given the privilege of restoring the old structure. Between 1817 and 1819 the villa got its neoclassical style, while the gardens were remodelled by the director of the Botanical Gardens of Naples, Mr Friedrich Dehnardt. The park was embellished with 150 plant species, among which you can find pine trees, plane trees and a rich collection of camellias.

By the end of the restoration project, the Villa Floridiana comprised two buildings, Villa Lucia and villa Florìdia, a small open theatre, a little Ionic semi-circular temple, fake ruins and greenhouses in neoclassical style.

When the sovereigns died, the Villa Floridiana passed on to the heirs of the Duchess’ first marriage. Later, Villa Lucia and part of the gardens were sold to Count Pasquale Stanislao Mancini, thus becoming his residence in Naples.

In 1919, the Floridiana was bought by the state and was transformed into a museum. The first exhibition was the ceramics collection received from Maria Spinelli di Scalea, niece of Placido Sangro, Duke of Martina. So, the Museum was named after him. Placido di Sangro, comes from the Neapolitan noble family “Di sanguine”, resident in “sedile di Nilo”, but having land also in Aquila, Benevento, Lucera e Troia. Placido di Sangro lived during the 16th century and worked as an ambassador for Charles V. He was a scholar and got appointed “Prince” of the Academy of Sireni or Sereni attended by distinguished aristocrats of the time.

Placido di Sangro was received by Emperor Charles V, as Ambassador of Neapolitans. After the interview, the emperor, fearing to lose the Kingdom of Naples for the multiplication of riots that caused quite a few losses in the Spanish Army, proclaimed a pardon for rebels and decided that in Naples there would be no Inquisition.

The Kingdom of Naples became a happy and safe place for the people persecuted by the Inquisition of the Church. As a consequence, the family of Eleonora de Fonseca Pimentel, who had escaped from Portugal and Rome, moved to Naples to be free from religious persecution. The rich collection of items, collected during the second half of the 19th century by Placido de Sangro, duke of Martina and given to the city of Naples in 1911 by his grandson, the earl of Marsi Placido de Sangro, well reflects the climate of enthusiasm and of renewed interest in the so-called minor arts, which spread over Europe at that time.

The duke of Martina, estimator and connoisseur of every type of artefacts, bought items from the main European cities gathering, starting from the second half of the 19th century, an impressive collection of chinaware, majolica and minor artistic artefacts made of glass, leather, coral and ivory.

== Itinerary ==
The visit of the museum starts from the vestibule, where the visitors can see the paintings of Ferdinand IV of Bourbon and of the Duchess Floridia, and leads them to the other floors through the large side staircase.

The collections of the museum have been expanded in 1978, when an heir of the duke of Martina, Riccardo de Sangro, posthumously donated a collection of 580 items, including porcelain, majolica and furniture belonging to the original collection of Placido de Sangro.

More recently, another donation from De Felice enriched the museum with tortoiseshell artefacts.

Today, the National Museum of ceramics Duca di Martina, with its 6,000 oriental and occidental items on display, hosts one of the biggest collections in Italy of decorative art from the 12th to the 19th century.

The museum is on three levels: ground floor, basement and first floor.

=== Ground Floor ===
Entering the villa, on the ground floor, visitors can appreciate some porcelain and sketches made by Neapolitan artists of the 2nd and 18th centuries.

In the vestibule, there is a picture of the duke of Martina by Salvatore Postiglione.

In this area, visitors can also find Renaissance and Baroque Majolica, precious pictures, furniture, caskets, 15th to 18th century glass and crystal items, as well as artefacts made of ivory, glaze, tortoiseshell, coral and bronze dating back to the Middle Ages and the Renaissance.

=== Basement ===
Majolica is important in the collection of the Duca di Martina. It is on display in the basement of the museum and includes Renaissance majolica from Deruta, Gubbio, Faenza and Palermo, and 17th century majolica from Castelli, in Abruzzo.

In this area, the visitors can see glass from Venice and glaze from Limoges dating back to the 15th and 16th century, artefacts made of leather, caskets, tobacco tins and corals.

The museum is particularly proud to host the most important oriental art collection in Italy, comprising 1,200 items of porcelain, bronze, jade and glaze.

The Ming (1368-1644) and Qing (1644-1911) chinaware collections, together with the Japanese Kakiemon and Imari collections are astounding.

=== First Floor ===
The first floor of the museum is entirely dedicated to European porcelain. The Saxon collection of Meissen, the Bourbon collection of Capodimonte and the collection of the Marquis Carlo Ginori a Doccia stand out for the quality and number of items on display.

In this area, the visitors can also see French porcelain from Chantilly, Rouen, Saint-Cloud, Mennency and Sevrès.

The rooms follow Roman numbers and go from room XV to room XXVIII.

== See also ==
- List of museums in Naples
