= Palazzo Tirelli, Reggio Emilia =

Aristocratic palace in Reggio Emilia, Italy

Coordinates: 44°41′52″N 10°38′10″E

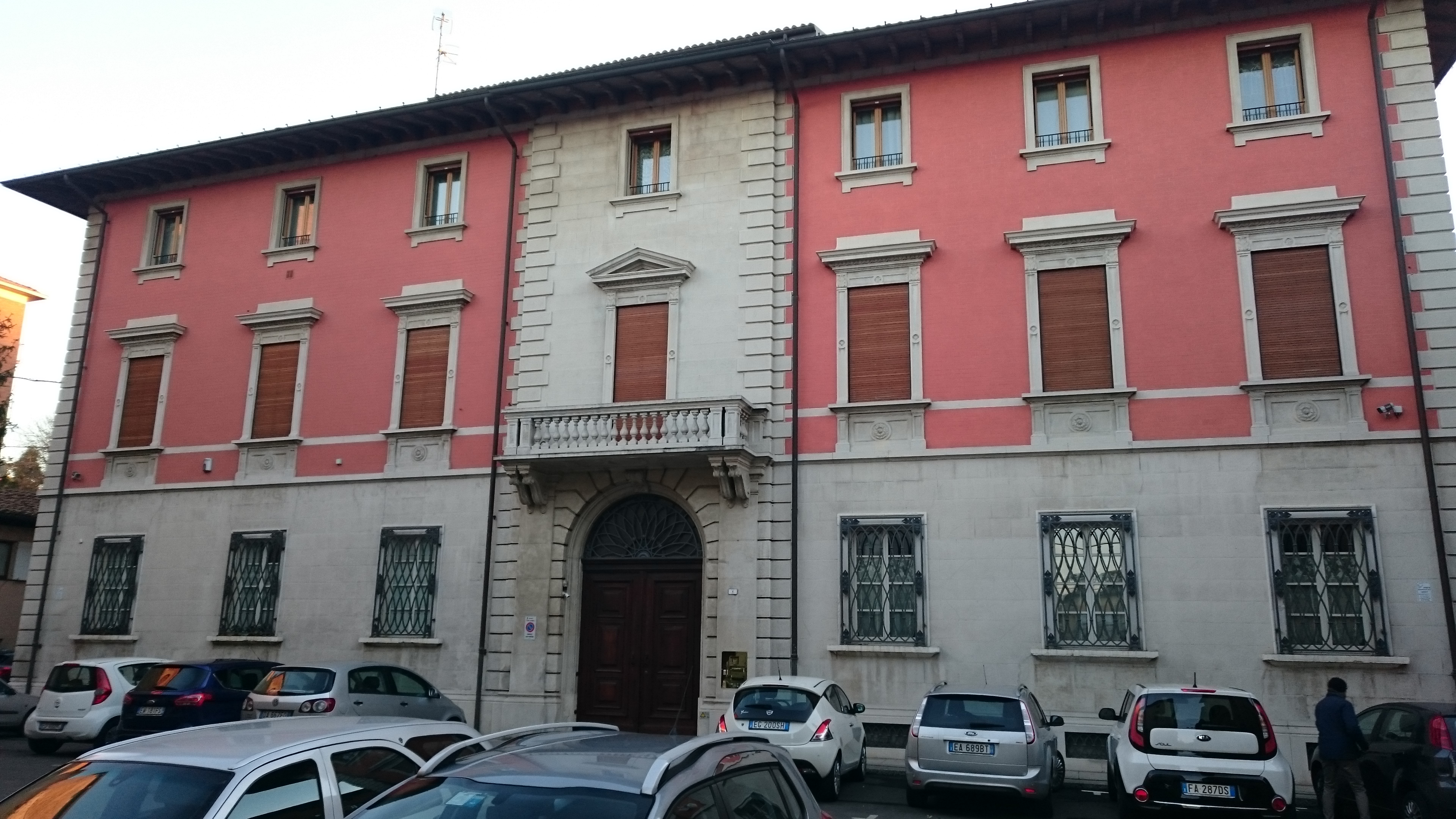
Palazzo Tirelli in Reggio Emilia

Palazzo Tirelli (formerly Gabbi) is a former aristocratic palace located on Via Gabbi #16 in the historical centre of Reggio Emilia, Italy.

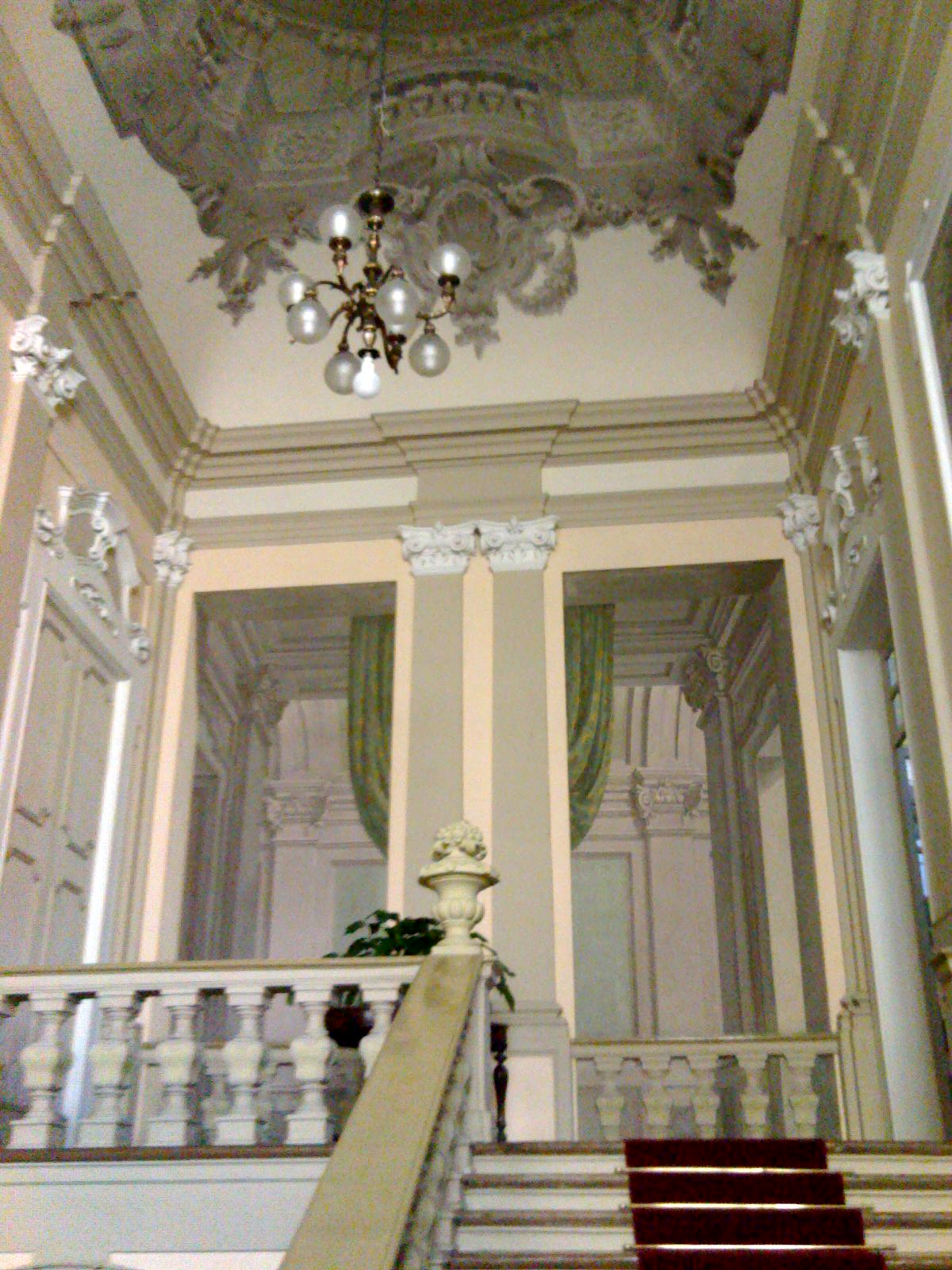
Entrance staircase

== History ==
A palace at this site was originally built was built in the 17th century as the residence for the marquises Gabbi. In the beginning of the 19th century the palazzo was sold to the aristocratic Tirelli family; in 1970, they sold a part of it to a club called Società del Casino, that at present still owns it. The rotary club of Reggio also has its head office on the ground floor.

The grand staircase leads to the rooms of the first floor decorated with stucco and frescos of the local painter Prospero Zanichelli. The biggest room, 13 metres high, is decorated with frescos and 8 paintings that represent Homeric scenes, by Francesco Vellani from Modena.

There is a Palazzo Tirelli in Parma.
