= Ponte di Surriento =

Arch bridge in Qualiano, Italy

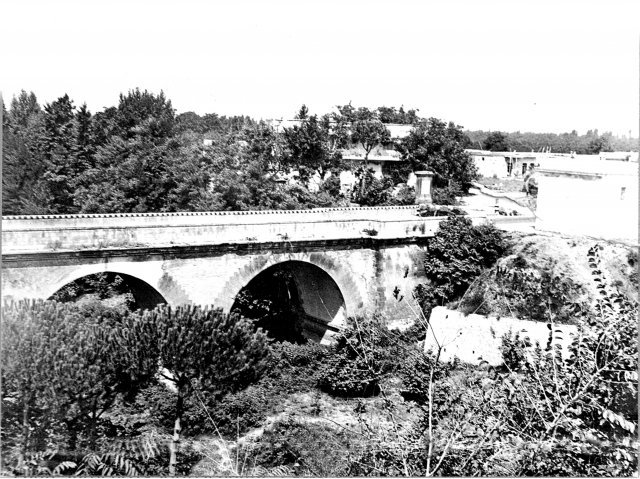
- The bridge in the 1950s
- Coordinates: 40°54′48″N 14°08′44″E
- Crosses: Camaldoli streambed
- Locale: Qualiano, Italy

Characteristics
- Design: Arch bridge
- Material: Trachyte, yellow tuff, and brick
- No. of spans: 3

History
- Construction end: 1850
- Opened: 1850

Location
- Interactive map of Ponte di Surriento

The Ponte di Surriento is a masonry arch bridge located in Qualiano, in the Metropolitan City of Naples. Built in 1850 on the orders of Ferdinand II of the Two Sicilies, it spans the Camaldoli streambed and still serves as an overpass along the route of via Campana (or Corso Campano), connecting it to via Consolare Campana in Villaricca, in the hamlet of Torretta-Scalzapecora (popularly known as Villaricca Due).

== History ==
The bridge was built in 1850, under Bourbon rule, to cross the Camaldoli streambed below, as part of works to lay out the new via Campana (which takes its name from the ancient Via Campana), built as part of a programme to improve connections between the towns north of Naples and the port of Pozzuoli. A popular tradition, though considered unfounded by some authors, holds that the road and the bridge were built to ease the route to the nearby Masseria del Principe, a hunting estate that belonged to a brother of the king.

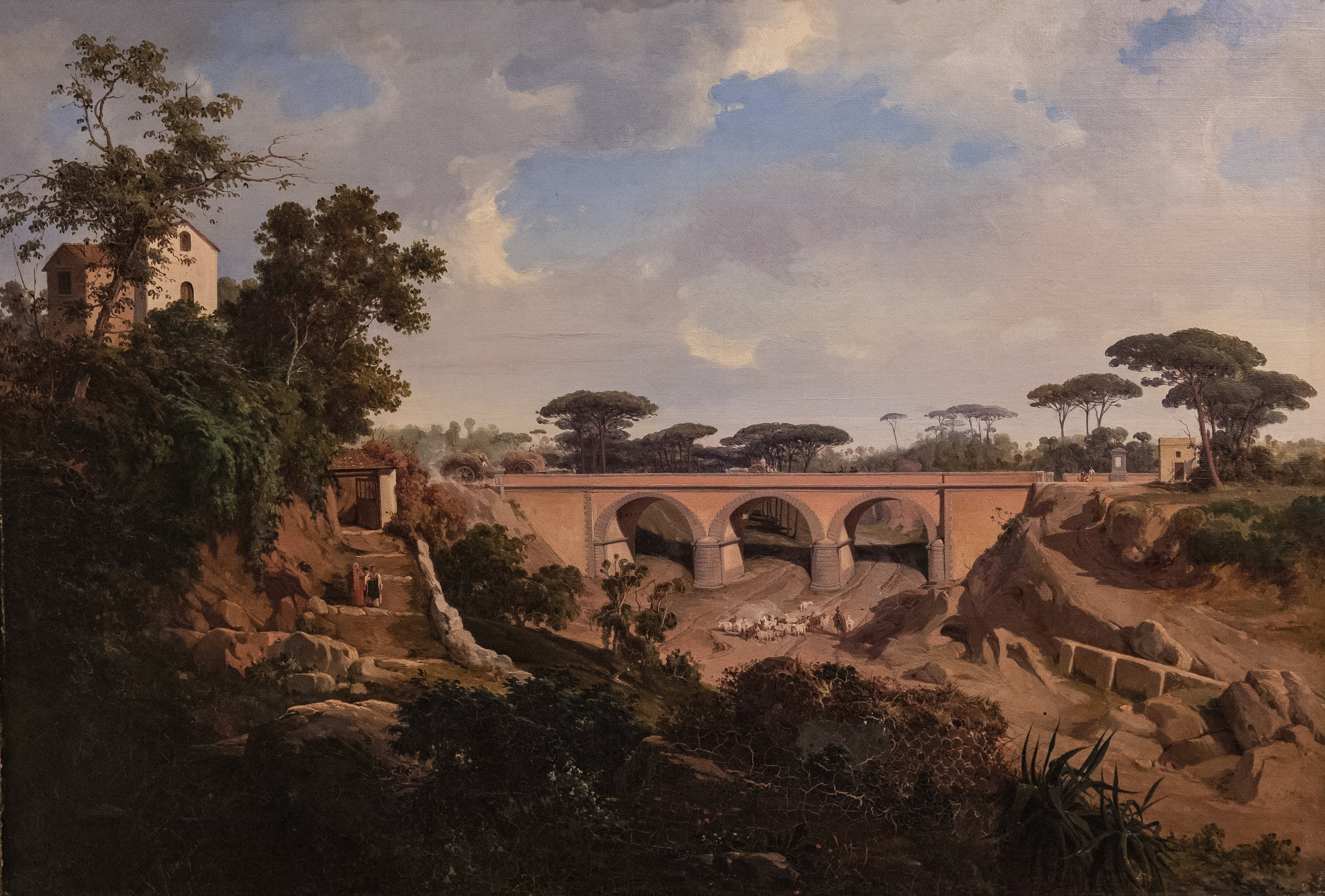
Il Ponte, Vincenzo Franceschini (1851)

The structure is depicted in an 1851 painting, Il ponte ("The bridge"), by the painter Vincenzo Franceschini, held at the Museum of Capodimonte.

During the World War II the western span was destroyed by German troops and was rebuilt after the war, as can be seen from the absence of trachyte in the rebuilt section.

In 1954, during construction work on nearby public housing, twenty-two box-shaped tombs dating to the 2nd–3rd century BC were discovered, built from tuff blocks and containing small amphorae, grave goods, and funerary furnishings.

== Description ==
The bridge consists of three finely worked round arches, built from blocks of trachyte alternating with blocks of yellow tuff and clay bricks. To commemorate the work, the king had a white marble plaque set into the apse next to the bridge, embedded in a block of trachite and still preserved today, bearing a Latin inscription with the date 1850:

VIAM AB ACRO IULIANO USQUE PUTEOLOS CAMPANAM OB HONOR ROM. NOMINIS DICTAM AD EXERCENDA COMMERC. OPIMAE CIRCUM REGIONIS CUM ORA MARITIMA FERDINANDUS II UTR. SIC. REX. STRAVIT PER IX PASSUUM MILIA PONTEM QUE REGIA MUNIFICENTIAE TESTEM PRAERUPTIS IMPOSUIT AN MDCCCL

The inscription records that Ferdinand II, King of the Two Sicilies, had the road from Giugliano to Pozzuoli paved for nine miles, called Campana in honour of the Roman name, to promote trade between the fertile surrounding region and the sea, and that he had the bridge built over the ravine as a testament to royal munificence, in the year 1850.

== Etymology ==
The origin of the name Surriento is uncertain. Although Surriento is the Neapolitan form of Sorrento, a derivation from the Sorrentine town is considered unlikely. A popular belief traces it to the expression "ponte sul rientro" ("bridge on the way back"), as it would have been used to return from the city; however, this etymology is not documented.

== Parco Surriento ==
The area beneath the bridge, unused for a long time, was the subject of a restoration project promoted by Circolo Helios, a cultural and environmental association based in Qualiano. In 2007 the association obtained a concession for the space and turned it into "Parco Surriento", a green area equipped for outdoor recreational, folk, and sporting activities; the same association has also carried out work to promote local history.

== Bibliography ==
- Sabatino, Giovanni. Ipotesi storico-urbanistiche sull'origine e sullo sviluppo della città di Qualiano. "Civiltà campana" series no. 6. Istituto di Studi Atellani, 1986.

== See also ==
- Qualiano
- Corso Campano
- Ferdinand II of the Two Sicilies
