= Villa Floridiana =

Monumental house in Vomero, Naples, Italy

Coordinates: 40.839400°N 14.230050°E

- Villa Floridiana
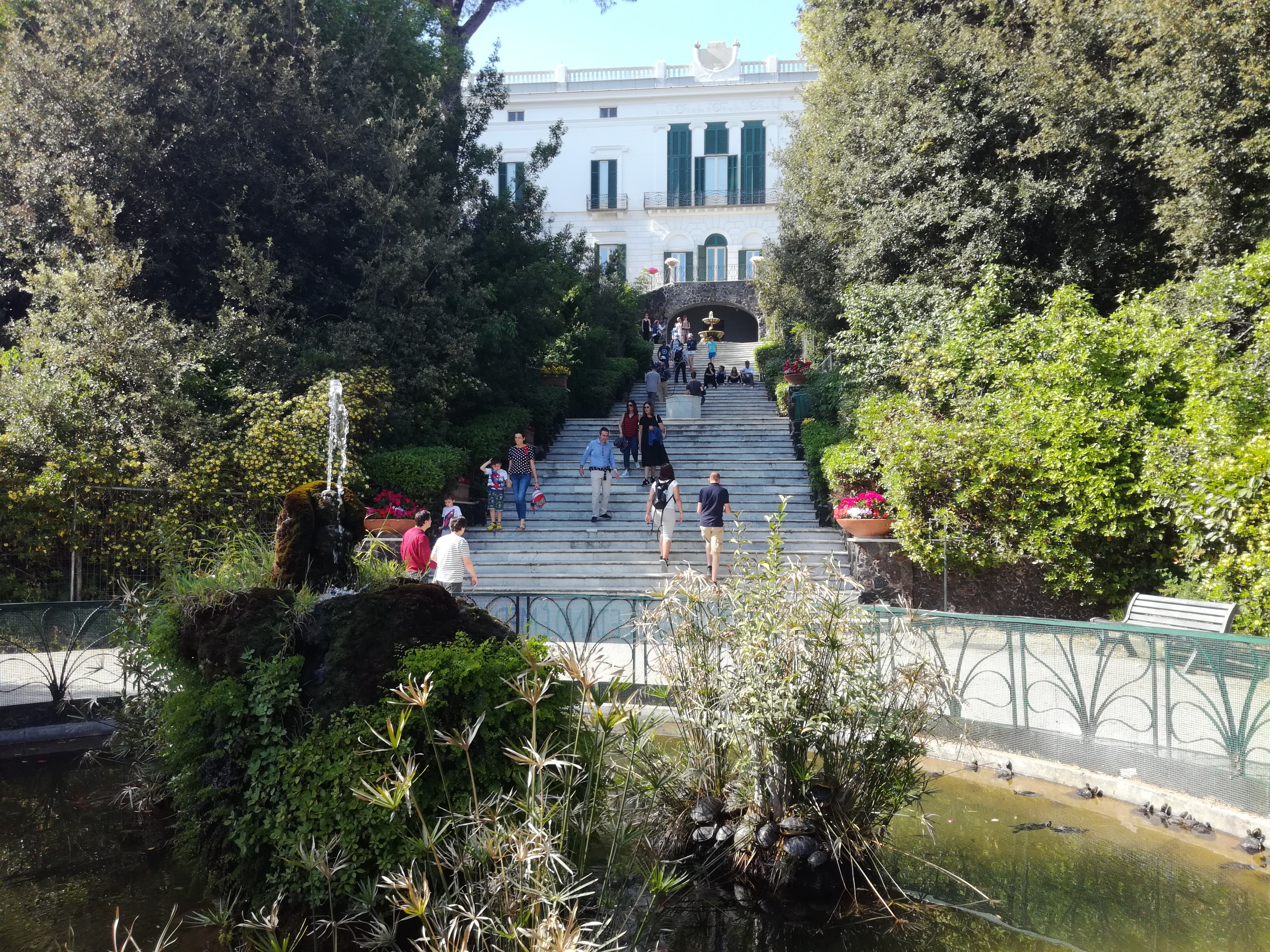
- The Villa Floridiana on the Vomero hill in Naples.
- Interactive map of the Villa Floridiana area

General information
- Status: Palace now used as a museum, National Gallery
- Type: Villa
- Architectural style: Neo-Classical
- Location: Naples, Italy
- Construction started: 1817
- Completed: 1819
- Client: Ferdinand I of the Two Sicilies

Technical details
- Floor count: 2

Design and construction
- Architect: Antonio Niccolini

The Villa Floridiana is a monumental house located amid a large park in the Vomero quarter in Naples, southern Italy. It overlooks the western Neapolitan suburbs of Chiaia and Mergellina.

== History ==
Construction of a villa at the site was begun by Cristoforo Saliceti and his heirs; Cristoforo had been minister of police for the government of Joachim Murat. In 1817, they were forced to sell to Ferdinand I, the Bourbon king of the Two Sicilies, who used it to house Lucia Migliaccio di Partanna, duchess of Floridia, whom Ferdinand had married morganatically in 1814. She resided here till her death in 1826.

Between 1817 and 1819, the architect Antonio Niccolini reconstructed the building and the surrounding gardens, landscaping in a free, English-style. The director of the Botanical Gardens, Friedrich Dehnhardt, planted oaks, pines, palms, cypresses and a large selection of flowers in the gardens.

The neoclassical residence and surrounding gardens were built between 1817 and 1819. The villa since 1931 has housed the National Museum of Ceramics, Naples, also called the Museo Duca di Martina. The Duke of Martina, second-born son of Riccardo and Maria Argentina Caracciolo, born in Naples in 1929, but moving to Paris where he began collecting decorative arts. His heirs donated the collection in 1911 to the city of Naples.

Since at least 1953, the gardens have been home to a colony of predominantly black stray cats, which are cared for by volunteers.
