= Fontanesi =

Fontanesi is a surname. Notable people with the surname include:

- Alberto Fontanesi (1929–2016), Italian footballer
- Antonio Fontanesi (1818–1882), Italian painter
- Francesco Fontanesi (1751–1795), Italian painter and scenic designer
- Leonardo Fontanesi (born 1996), Italian footballer
