= Carlo Raimondi =

Italian painter (1809–1883)

Carlo Raimondi (December 24, 1809 – January 5, 1883) was an Italian engraver and painter, active mainly at Parma.

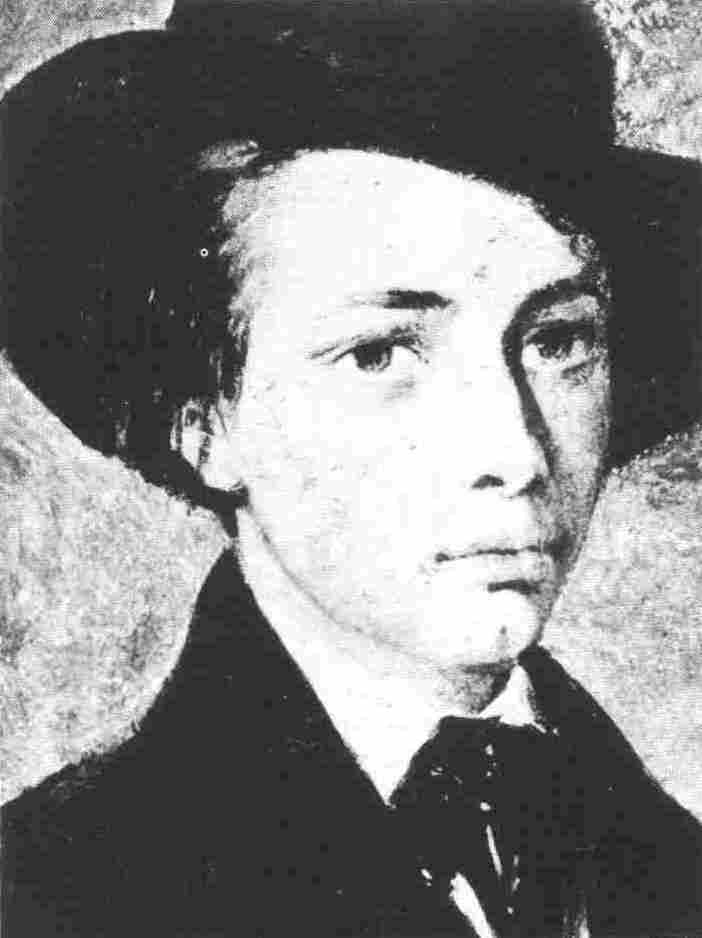
Self-Portrait

== Biography ==
Raimondi was born in Bocche di Cattaro. He moved to Reggio Emilia as an infant, and lived there for 27 years. He studied in Reggio as a pupil of Prospero Minghetti, then studied with Giovanni della Rocca and finally Paolo Toschi at Parma (1822–1828). He became in 1848 a docent teaching engraving at the Brera Academy in Milan, until he was recruited in 1854 to direct the School of Engraving at the Parmesan Academy, where he later succeeded Toschi. He worked by his own and in collaboration with Toschi, making wood engravings of masterpieces of the galleries of Parma, Turin, and Florence.

In Parma, Raimondi gathered prominent pupils: Antonio Costa from the Academy of Fine Arts of Florence, Tommaso Aloysio Juvara from the Academy of Fine Arts of Naples, Ludovico Bigola from the Albertina Academy of Turin, Odoardo Eichens from the School of Fine Arts of Berlin. When the 1860 decree of the minister Luigi Carlo Farini fused into one the Academies of Fine Arts of Parma, Modena, and Bologna; Parma was recognized as still being the premier school of engraving of the three.

He also painted, mainly watercolors; again sometimes reproducing masterworks, but also portraits and genre works such as Canzone d’amore and Alla toilette, displayed at the 1852 exhibition at the Academy of Fine Arts of Parma.

Among his masterworks are his portraits of Paolo Toschi and Vittorio Emanuele II, and his La Baccante from a painting of Annibale Carracci. In the 1870 National Exposition of Fine Arts, he was awarded a personal merit medal. He died in 1883 in Parma.
