= Giovanni Rocca =

Giovanni Rocca may refer to:

- Giovanni Antonio Rocca (1607–1656), Italian mathematician
- Giovanni Nasalli Rocca di Corneliano (1872–1952), Italian Cardinal of the Catholic Church
- Gianni Rocca (1929–2013), Italian sprinter
- Giovanni Rocca (engraver) (1788-1858)
