= Fulvio Testi =

Italian diplomat and poet (1593–1646)

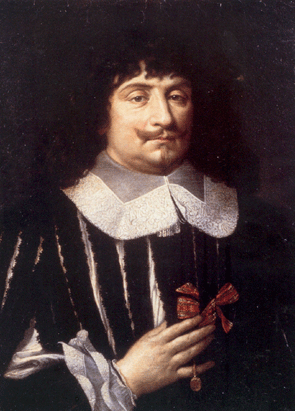
- Ludovico Lana, Portrait of Fulvio Testi, c. 1629
- Born: August 1593; Ferrara, Duchy of Ferrara
- Died: 28 August 1646 (aged 52–53); Modena, Duchy of Modena and Reggio
- Resting place: San Domenico, Modena
- Other name: Fulvio Savojano
- Education: University of Bologna; University of Ferrara
- Occupations: Diplomat; Poet; Politician; Writer
- Spouse: Anna Leni (m. 1614)
- Children: 7
- Parent(s): Giulio Testi and Margherita Testi (née Calmoni)
- Honours: Order of Saints Maurice and Lazarus; Order of Santiago
- Writing career
- Language: Italian, Latin
- Notable works: Poesie liriche Le Filippiche contro gli spagnuoli

Fulvio Testi (Italian pronunciation: [ˈfulvjo ˈtɛsti]; August 1593 in Ferrara – 28 August 1646 in Modena) was an Italian diplomat and poet who is recognised as one of the main exponents of 17th-century Italian Baroque literature. He worked in the service of the d'Este dukes in Modena, for whom he held high office, such as the governorship of Garfagnana. Poetically, alongside Gabriello Chiabrera, he was the major exponent of the Hellenizing strand of Baroque classicism, combining Horatianism with the imitation of Anacreon and Pindar. His poems tackle civic themes in solemn tones, showing Testi's lasting anti-Spanish and, consequently, pro-Savoia political passions. Accused of treason for having tried to set up diplomatic relations with the French court, he was imprisoned and died in jail soon after. According to Giacomo Leopardi:

If he'd been born in a less barbarous age, and had had more time than he did to cultivate his talent, he would doubtless have been our Horace, and perhaps been hotter and more vehement and more sublime than the Latin man

== Life ==
The son of Giulio and Margherita Calmoni, Fulvio studied literature and philosophy with the Jesuits at Modena, and then studied poetry privately at Bologna. His sonnets, circulating in manuscript, had already earned him a certain amount of fame by 1611, before entering the services of the Este chancellery, as a scribe. His first volume of verses, published at Venice in 1613 and dedicated to his patron and lord Alfonso III d'Este, followed the well-established vein of the Baroque pastoral idyll and courtly Mannerist marinismo. That same year, he travelled to Naples and Rome, forming a friendship with Alessandro Tassoni, and returned to Modena in the summer of 1614. In the autumn, he married Anna Leni.

His Rime published in 1617, anticipated by their dedication to Carlo Emanuele, Duke of Savoy, the anti-Spanish octaves they contained, which were composed in 1615 and better known under the title Il pianto d'Italia, and characterized the injuries being suffered by the Spanish hegemony in Italy, to such a degree that the Spanish Resident at the Duchy of Modena tendered a remonstrance, in consequence of which the printer Giuliano Cassiani was arrested and the edition suppressed. Testi, having fled the Duchy, was pronounced contumacious and exiled. Nevertheless, on receipt of a plea for forgiveness, he was pardoned by Cesare d'Este, 5 February 1619. In the following summer, the Duke of Savoy in question, apprised of the troubles Testi had undergone, enrolled him in the Savoyard Order of Santi Maurizio e Lazzaro, while the Duke acknowledged his literary gifts as virtuoso di camera.

Henceforth, Testi's career took him on a long series of travels of a diplomatic nature, notably to Vienna, Rome, Venice and Turin, with the result that in April 1635 he was awarded a feudal demesne that brought him the title of conte At the end of that year he was sent as ambassador to the court of Spain. Embarking 10 March 1636 at Vado, where he encountered an old acquaintance from Rome, Gabriello Chiabrera, his embassy in Madrid, which brought him the cross of the Order of Santiago, lasted exactly a year, though he would be sent again in 1638. Meanwhile, back in Modena by March 1637, Testi was made the Duke's Secretary of State. In 1640, stifled by court life (though he returned in 1642), with which he was perhaps always considered a parvenu, he asked for and obtained from Francesco I d'Este the post of governor of Garfagnana.

Following further diplomatic missions, he undertook confidential inquiries through the Italian Cardinal Mazarin, to be transferred to the court of France. Upon discovery, in January 1646, he was committed to the prison of Modena as a traitor, where, after seven months' confinement, he died.

A hypothesis developed by Girolamo Tiraboschi suggested that Testi's imprisonment was motivated by the resentment of principe Raimondo Montecuccoli, to whom Testi would have dedicated a far from flattering ode; the poet Ugo Foscolo, absorbing Tiraboschi's thesis, recorded nevertheless that the ode in question, though dedicated tor Montecuccoli, indirectly affronted the Este.

== Main works ==
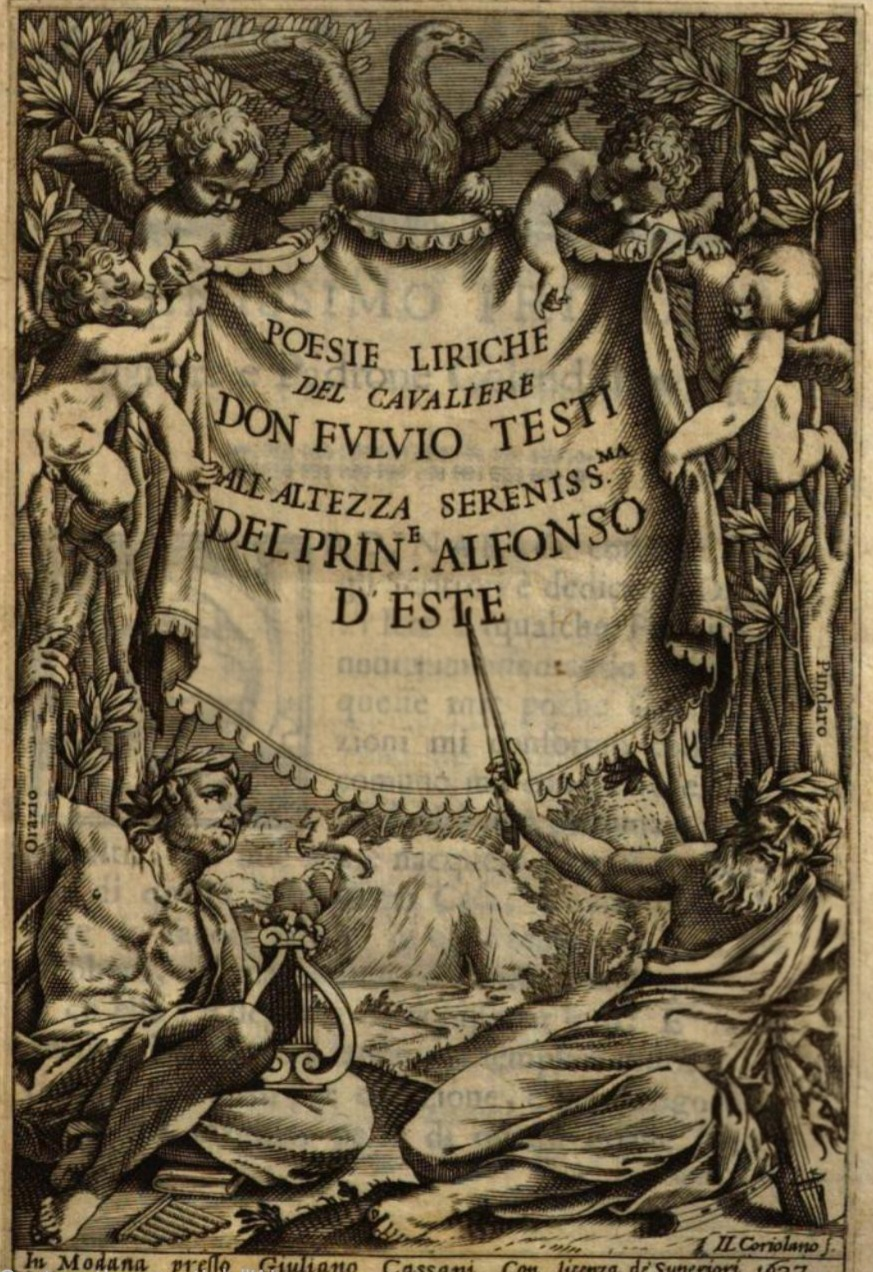
Engraved titlepage of Testi's Poesie liriche, Modena, 1627

=== Lyric poems ===
- Fulvio Testi (1617). Rime. Modena: per Giuliano Cassiani.
- Fulvio Testi (1627). Poesie liriche. Modena: presso Giuliano Cassani.
- Fulvio Testi, L'isola d'Alcina, 1626.
- Fulvio Testi (1652). L'Arsinda, ouero la descendenza de' ser.mi prencipi d'Este. Venetia: per Francesco Baba.
- Fulvio Testi (1817). Opere scelte. Vol. I (Poesie). Modena: Presso la Società tipografica.

=== Political works ===
- Fulvio Testi (1618). L'Italia all'inuittissimo, e gloriosissimo prencipe Carlo Emanuel Duca di Sauoia. Torino: s.e.
- Fulvio Testi (1643). Ristretto delle ragioni che la serenissima Casa d'Este ha colla Camera apostolica, con le risposte di Roma, & contrarisposte per parte del serenissimo di Modena. s.l.: s.e.
- Fulvio Testi (1838). Scritti inediti di Daniello Bartoli, Fulvio Testi, Alberto Lollio. Ferrara: Dai tipi Negri alla Pace.
- Fulvio Testi (1902). Francesco Bartoli (ed.). Le filippiche e due altre scritture contro gli spagnuoli. con lo pseudonimo di Fulvio Savojano. Milano: Società Editrice Sonzogno.

=== Letters ===
- Fulvio Testi (1817). Opere scelte. Vol. II (Lettere). Modena: Presso la Società tipografica.
- Fulvio Testi, Lettere inedite in nome del duca Francesco I. a Francesco Sassatelli, luogotenente di Vignola, s.e., Modena 1841.
- Fulvio Testi (1843). "Lettere inedite". Memorie di Religione, di Morale e di Letteratura. Modena: Real tip. Soliani: 49–85 (t. XV) e 333–346 (t. XVI).
- Alfredo Lazzari, ed. (1872). Quattro lettere inedite di Fulvio Testi. Faenza: Conti.
- Fulvio Testi, Lettere, 3 voll. (1609–1633, 1634–1637, 1638–1646), a cura di Maria Luisa Doglio, Casa editrice Giuseppe Laterza & figli, Bari 1967.

== Bibliography ==
- Leone, Marco (2019). "TESTI, Fulvio". Dizionario Biografico degli Italiani (in Italian). Vol. 95: Taranto–Togni. Rome: Institute of the Italian Encyclopaedia. ISBN 978-88-12-00032-6.
- Slawinski, M. (2002). "Testi, Fulvio". The Oxford Companion to Italian Literature. Oxford University Press. ISBN 978-0-19-818332-7.
- Fassò, Luigi (1937). "TESTI, Fulvio". Enciclopedia Italiana. Rome: Istituto dell'Enciclopedia Italiana.
- Rizza, Cecilia (1957). "Sulla fortuna di Fulvio Testi nella Francia del secolo XVII". Lettere Italiane. 9 (2): 145–167. JSTOR 26245943.
- Doglio, Maria Luisa (1964). "Intorno alle lettere edite e inedite di Fulvio Testi". Lettere Italiane. 16 (4): 425–444. JSTOR 26248731.
- Ottone, Giuseppe (1970). "Sullo stile epistolare di Fulvio Testi". Aevum. 44 (5/6): 486–493. JSTOR 25820969.
- Pevere, Fulvio (2004). ""Mirti amorosi" ed "eterni lauri": forme del petrarchismo nella poesia di Fulvio Testi". In Amedeo Quondam (ed.). Petrarca in barocco: cantieri petrarcheschi: due seminari romani. Rome: Bulzoni. pp. 123–149. doi:10.1400/28253.
- García Aguilar, Monica (2010). "La pubblicistica antispagnola nell'Italia letteraria del Seicento: Fulvio Testi e la corte di Madrid". Scrittura e potere: intorno all'impegno politico nella letteratura italiana. Rome: Bulzoni. pp. 117–147. doi:10.1400/193412.
- Sarnelli, Mauro (2022). "Le rime di Giovanni Delfino e "l'arricchita Musa" (oraziana) di Fulvio Testi". Studi Veneziani. LXXXV/LXXXVI (86): 183–198. doi:10.19272/202203102004.
