= Palazzo Masdoni, Reggio Emilia =

Building in Emilia-Romagna, Italy

Coordinates: 44.69601°N 10.63379°E

The Palazzo Masdoni is a Baroque and Neoclassical-style palace located on Via Toschi #23 in the historic center of the town of Reggio Emilia in Italy. The palaces is notable for its quadratura or painted architecture in its two-story Sala di Musica or Music Room. From 1954 to 1991, it was the provincial office of the Italian Communist party. It rises across the street from the Istituto Omozzoli Parisetti.

The original palace was commissioned in the 18th century by the Masdoni family, to be built at the site of a 15th-century house. The architect was Giovanni Maria Ferraroni. The property had diverse subsequent owners including the Toschi starting in 1796, and later the Rocca-Saporiti in the 19th century. In the early 20th century the property was refurbished by Edoardo Collamarini. The monumental interior staircase decorated with stuccoes and statues was designed by Antonio Schiassi. The Music room was designed by Francesco Vellani.
