= Paolo Toschi =

Italian draughtsman and engraver (1788–1854)

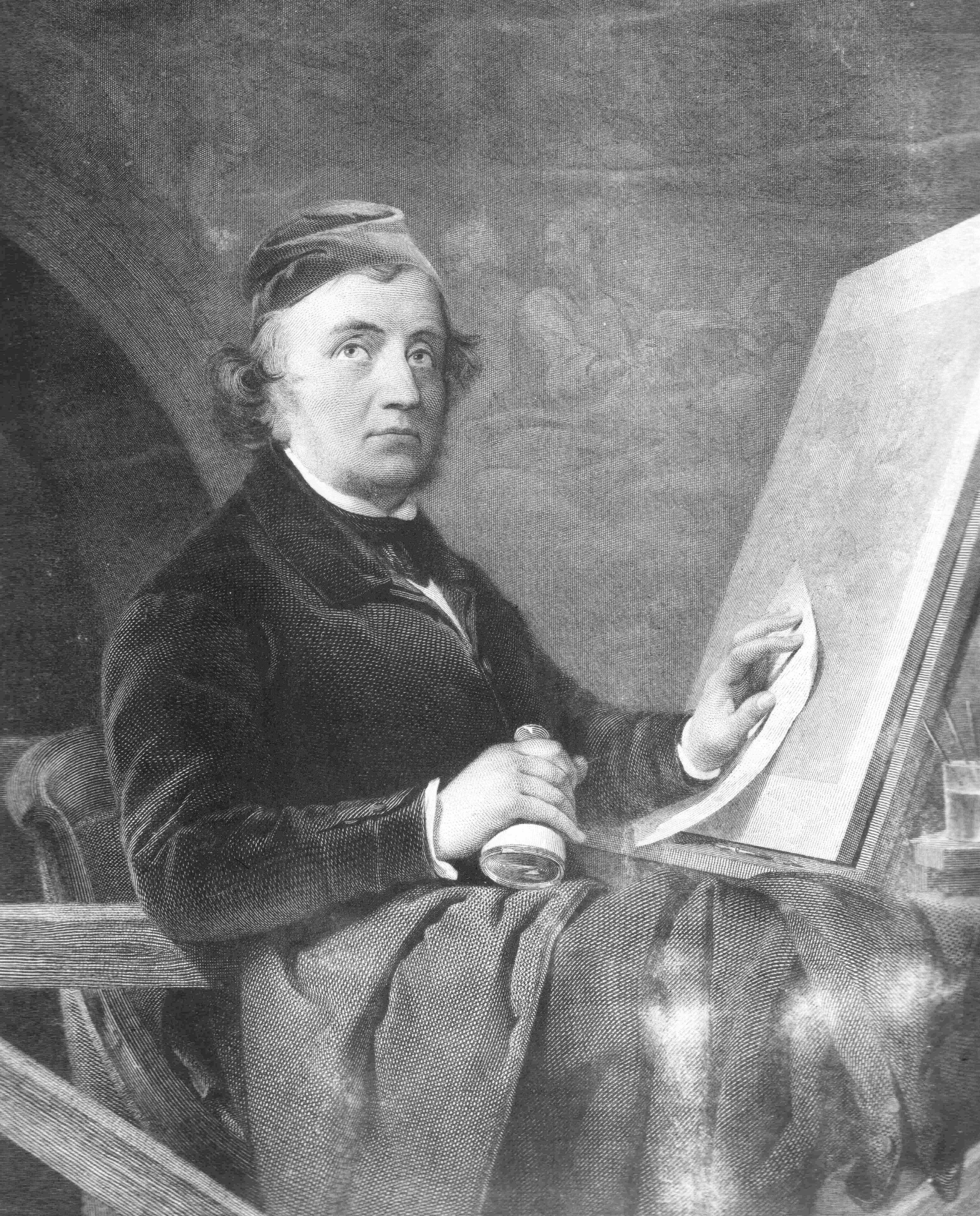
Paolo Toschi by his pupil Carlo Raimondi.

Paolo Toschi (1788 – 30 July 1854) was an Italian draughtsman and engraver. He was born in Parma.

== Biography ==
He trained in Paris under Charles Clément Bervic, and first made a reputation by a fine etching of Henry IV, after Gérard. In 1837 he was appointed Professor of Engraving and Director of the Academy of Fine Arts of Parma, and shortly afterwards was commissioned to carry out the reproduction of Correggio's and Parmigianino's injured frescoes in San Giovanni Evangelista, and in the church of the Steccata in Parma, in water-color and engraving. The results were published in forty-eight plates.

From 1820 to 1828, the engraver Carlo Raimondi was his pupil, and later he was a collaborator. Toschi died in Parma. Other fine plates by Toschi are :

1. Lo Spasimo and Madonna Della Tenda after Raphael.
2. Deposition after Daniele da Volterra.
3. The Madonna della Scodella; after Correggio.
4. Venus and Adonis; after Francesco Albani.
5. Portraits of the Grand Duke of Tuscany; the Duo Descazes; Machiavelli; and Alfiori.
