= Antonio Niccolini (architect) =

Italian architect, scenic designer and engraver (1772–1850)

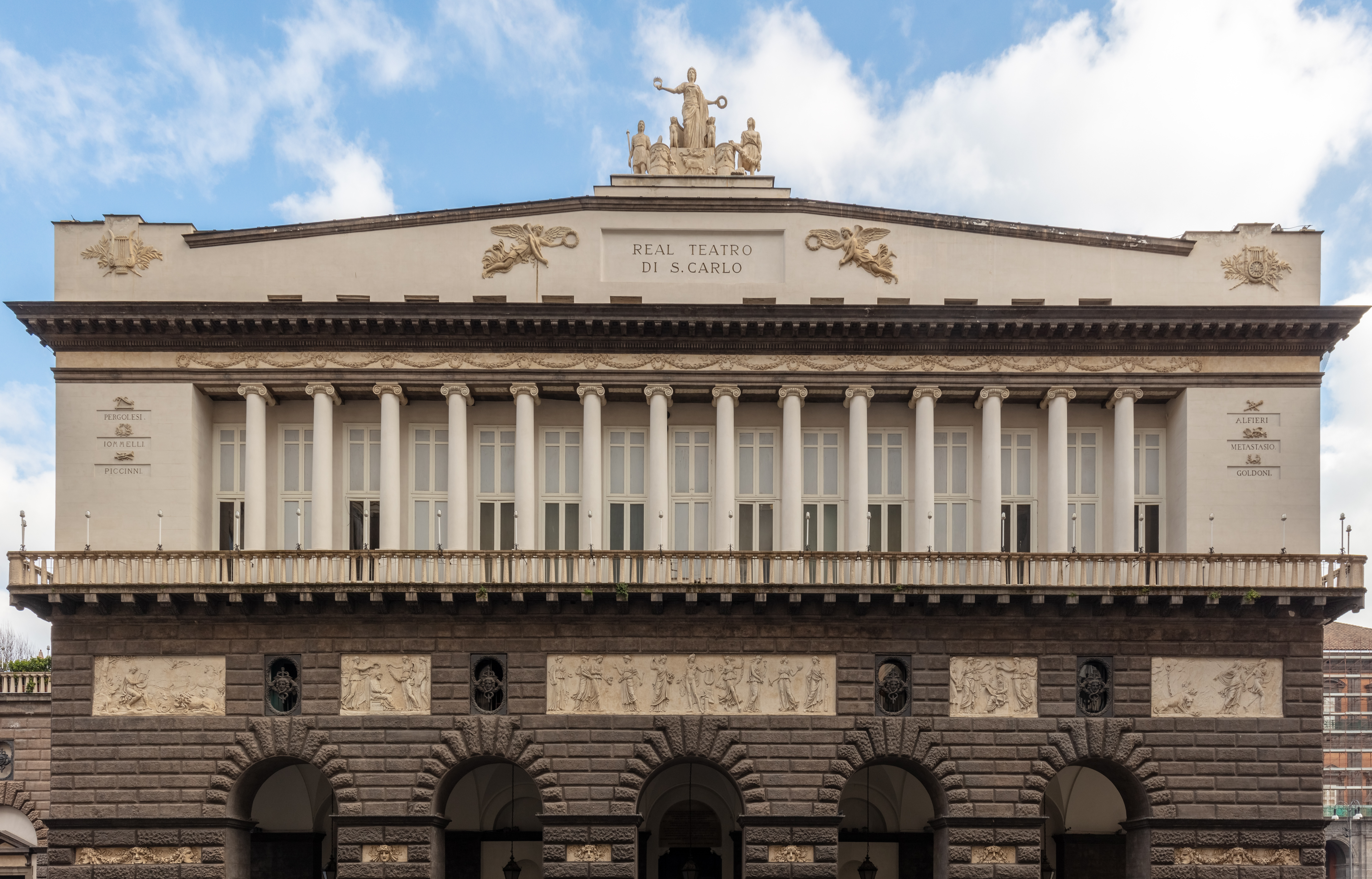
- Façade of the Teatro San Carlo of Naples
- Born: 21 April 1772; San Miniato, Grand Duchy of Tuscany
- Died: 8 May 1850 (aged 78); Naples, Kingdom of the Two Sicilies
- Employer: Accademia di Belle Arti di Napoli
- Known for: Architecture
- Notable work: Teatro San Carlo
- Movement: Neoclassicism, scenic design, engraving

Antonio Niccolini (21 April 1772 – 8 May 1850) was an Italian architect, scenic designer, and engraver.

== Biography ==
Niccolini was born in San Miniato al Tedesco, Tuscany. He grew up in the Grand Duchy of Tuscany, where his father, who worked as a prison guard, was interested in architecture and encouraged his son when, at the age of 14, he began to make drawings of buildings in Florence and to study the treatises of Vitruvius, Alberti and Palladio. He painted frescoes of architectural views in the workshop of the painter Pasquale Cioffi and was introduced to the art of theatrical design by Francesco Fontanesi.

Niccolini was greatly drawn to the culture and art of central Europe and was undoubtedly influenced also by the circle of the dramatist Vittorio Alfieri who had founded an academic theatre in the Palazzo d’Albany, Florence, for which Niccolini painted the scenery. He was also engaged in restoring and designing sets for a number of other Tuscan theatres, and his reputation for this work soon spread outside the Grand Duchy.

In 1807, he was summoned to direct the stage design of the royal theatres in Naples, where he spent the rest of his life. He became a colleague of Antonio De Simone and of the French architect Étienne-Chérubin Leconte (1761–1818). Niccolini established his influence on the Neoclassical style in Naples when he was appointed director (1822–49) of the Istituto di Belle Arti and effected its reform. He very soon became involved with architecture and, to some extent, with urban planning.

His fame is based essentially on the remodelling (1810–16) of the Teatro San Carlo and the radical enlargement of the Villa Floridiana (1817–19). The theatre was reconstructed in two phases, the second (1816) after a fire, and it is considered to be the supreme example of Neoclassical architecture in Naples. Its façade is composed of an Ionic loggia above a rusticated five-arched portico from which it is divided by a full-width balcony; the whole is crowned by a shallow pediment. The originality of this arrangement can be seen in the freedom with which Niccolini integrated and combined motifs from Renaissance sources with archaeological, scenographic and contemporary influences. The effect of the rustication was intended to be primarily visual. It extends as far as the springing of the arches and then becomes progressively less pronounced until towards the top it becomes almost flat ashlar-work.

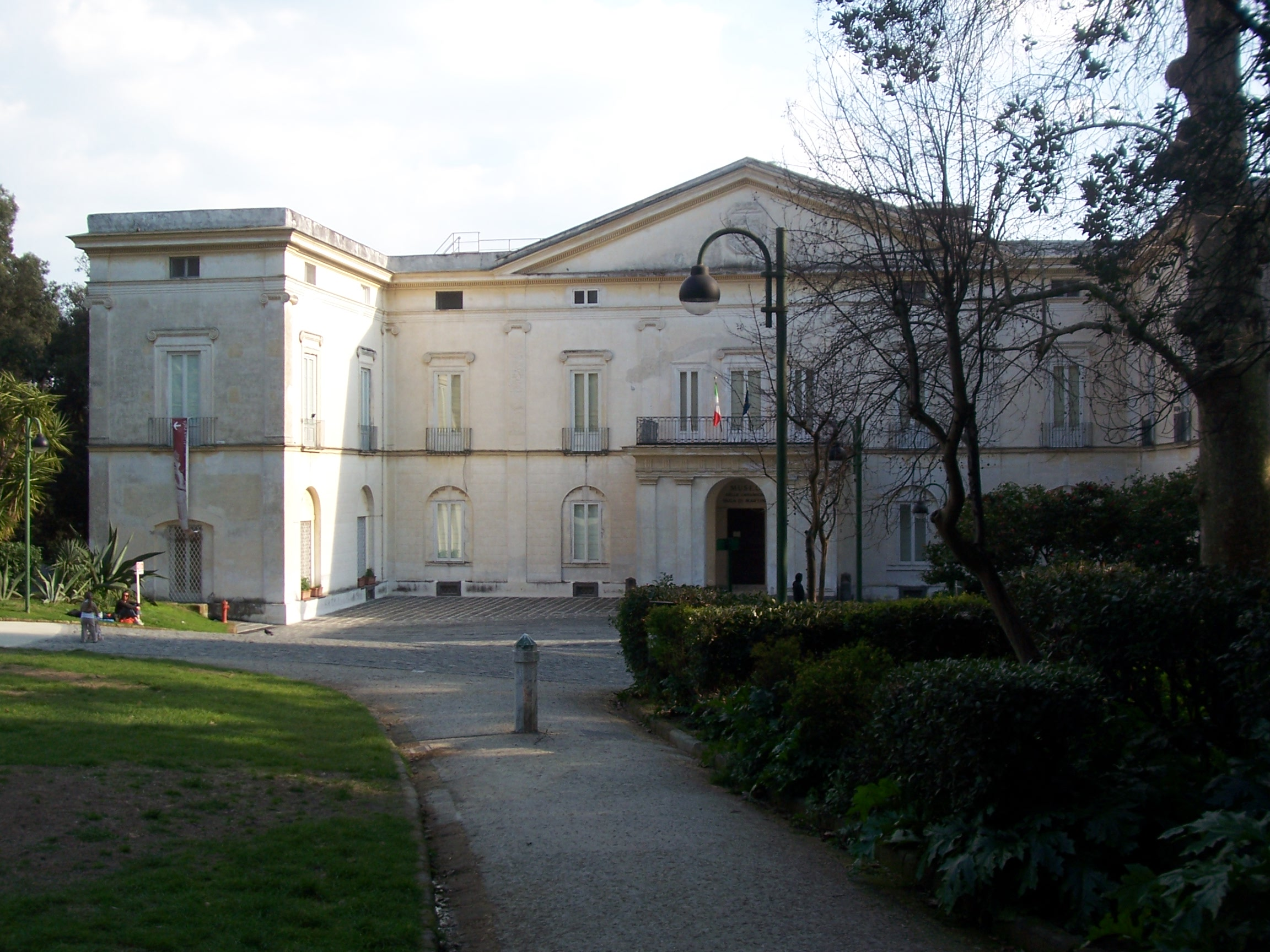
Façade of Villa Floridiana

The rebuilding of the Villa Floridiana and the layout of the gardens confirmed the qualities but also the limits of his work. The treatment of the grounds around the villa reveals his appreciation of the late 18th-century English Picturesque garden. The general proportions and formal characteristics of the villa and the accentuation of the central part of the façades show a personal elaboration in the manner of Palladio. Furthermore the motif of the broad axial staircase, which leads the eye up to the south façade and to a view of the whole, betrays a distinctly theatrical approach. The north façade has a projecting Doric portico and a pediment made wider to crown the entire central part of the façade. The upper storey is articulated with the Ionic order.

Niccolini’s urban planning projects seldom progressed beyond the design stage, as was the case with various schemes he drew up between the years of French rule (1806–15) and 1848 for the area around the royal palace. One project that was realized was the staircase (1836) of the Villa di Capodimonte; it is theatrically disposed at the end of a road laid out during the Napoleonic period and is laden with Neoclassical and neo-Egyptian references.

In his numerous stage designs, such as those for Giacomo Tritto’s opera Cesare in Egitto (1810), and in his temporary architectural structures, such as those designed for the funeral of King Ferdinand I, the vocabulary of Neoclassicism was intertwined with Egyptian architectural motifs. Niccolini justified this combination, which was in line with European developments but without precedent in Naples, by reference to the Hellenistic period in which Attic culture was enriched by the majestic forms of Egyptian Civilization.

Niccolini was fully aware that in his time architecture was expected not only to display good formal characteristics but also to have a theoretical basis. Thoroughly up to date with the theories of his time, he affirmed that unity, variety, order, symmetry, proportion and the consonance of the parts should come together to form a balanced whole in which majesty, richness and intelligence were combined with a Greek elegance and simplicity. In the manuscript that accompanied the designs for the first project (1809) for the Teatro San Carlo, he identified the four immutable principles of architecture as solidity, beauty, convenience and economy and carefully demonstrated how they were closely adhered to in his scheme.

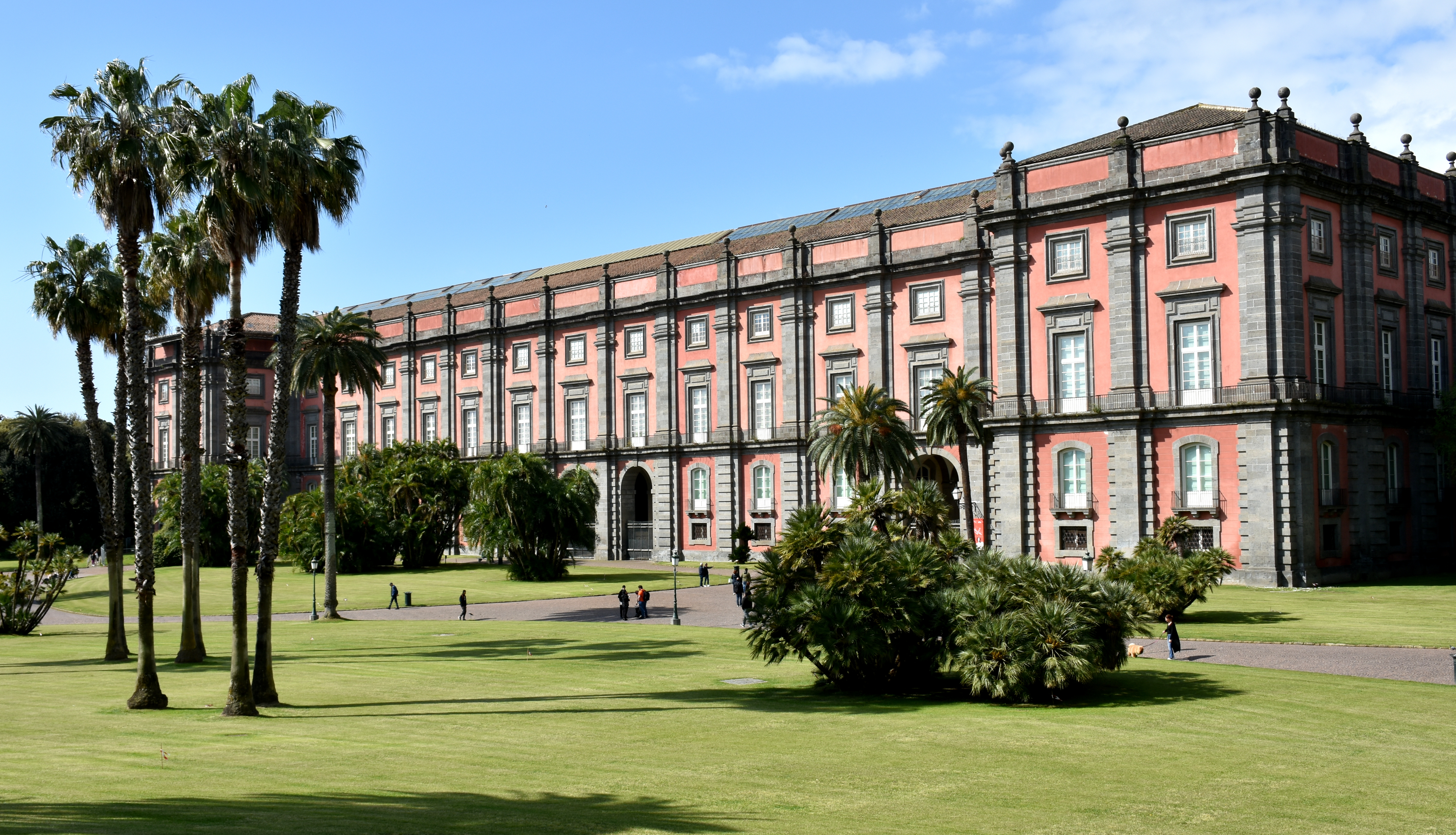
Royal palace at Capodimonte

As director of the Istituto di Belle Arti, the Scuola di Scenografia (founded 1816) and a school for artisans (founded 1825), Niccolini influenced the development of a large number of architects, stage designers and craftsmen. He also wrote essays on several different subjects, including art history and archaeology. Indefatigable, gifted and versatile, he found himself burdened with many tasks. Thus he made a formal request in 1826 to be excused from attending to the administrative duties of the works planned and directed by him and that ‘another person’ should be assigned to the job of ‘measuring, calculating and estimating the building costs’. In consequence, the designs for the completion of the royal palace at Capodimonte (1832–8) are now known to be by Niccolini, although Tommaso Giordano was in charge of the works and the accounts.

In his last years, with the assistance of his son Fausto Niccolini, the architect Francesco Maria Del Giudice and a team of artists, he modernized the interior of the Teatro San Carlo (1841–4). Niccolini died in Naples, aged 78.

== Writings ==
Niccolini published a number of treatises on architecture from Pompeii and Herculaneum, including:

- Quadro in musaico scoperto in Pompei a di 24 ottobre 1831. Prato: presso i Fratelli Giachetti. 1832.
- Sul ritratto di Leone X dipinto da Raffaello di Urbino e sulla copia di Andrea del Sarto. Naples: Stamperia Reale Giachetti. 1841.
- Descrizione della gran terma puteolana, volgarmente detta Tempio di Serapide. Naples: Stamperia Reale. 1846.

== Bibliography ==
- Venditti, Arnaldo (1961). Architettura neoclassica a Napoli. Naples: Edizioni scientifiche italiane.
- Mancini, Franco (1964). "Un'autobiografia inedita di Antonio Niccolini". Napoli Nobilissima. III: 185–194.
- Mancini, Franco (1980). Scenografia napoletana dell'ottocento: Antonio Niccolini e il neoclassico. Naples: Edizioni Scientifiche Italiane.
- Di Resta, Isabella (1980). "Conoscenza ed influenze palladiane nella Napoli neoclassica". Bollettino del Centro internazionale di studi di architettura Andrea Palladio. 12 (2): 183–191.
- Scalvini, Maria Luisa (1989). "Antonio Niccolini e il «Progetto Grande» per Napoli da Gioacchino Murat a Ferdinando II". In Paolo Carpeggiani; Luciano Patetta (eds.). Il disegno di architettura. Milan: Guerini. pp. 79–86.
- Anna Giannetti; Rossana Muzii Cavallo, eds. (1997). Antonio Niccolini: architetto e scenografo alla corte di Napoli, 1807-1850. Naples: Electa Napoli. pp. 79–86.
- Cassanelli, Roberto; Ciapparelli, Pier Luigi; Colle, Enrico; David, Massimiliano (2001). Houses and Monuments of Pompeii: The Work of Fausto and Felice Niccolini. Los Angeles: Getty Publications. ISBN 978-0892366842.
