= Hospital Omozzoli Parisetti =

Coordinates: 44.69609°N 10.63352°E

The Parisetti or Omozzoli Parisetti Hospital was once housed on the building on Via Toschi #24 in central Reggio Emilia, Italy, now housing the a nursing home (‘’casa di riposo’’) for the elderly ‘’Istituto Omozzoli Parisetti’’. For over 200 years, the site housed a hospice/hospital; it stands across the street from the Palazzo Masdoni and further along the street is the Palazzo Spalletti-Trivelli.

In 1699, the Count Paolo degli Omozzoli Parisetti built the oratory of Saints Pellegrino and Rocco at this site. In the late 1670s, his wealthy merchant family had been elevated into the aristocracy. Since 1410, the family had maintained a hospital, mainly servicing ill and poor pilgrims, and dedicated to Santa Maria della Carità near the church of San Raffaele. The building and integrated chapel has undergone a number of refurbishments, and the façade reflects mainly the reconstruction in the early 18th-century. In 1767, the Este family suppressed the hospice; but at present it regained part of its purpose as a home for the elderly.

The external entrance to the chapel stands at the last bay on the right, above the entrance is a medieval plaque. The chapel has a baroque altarpiece, below an oval with a depiction of St George.
