= Oratory of San Spiridione =

Church building in Reggio nell'Emilia, Italy

Coordinates: 44.70068°N 10.62615°E

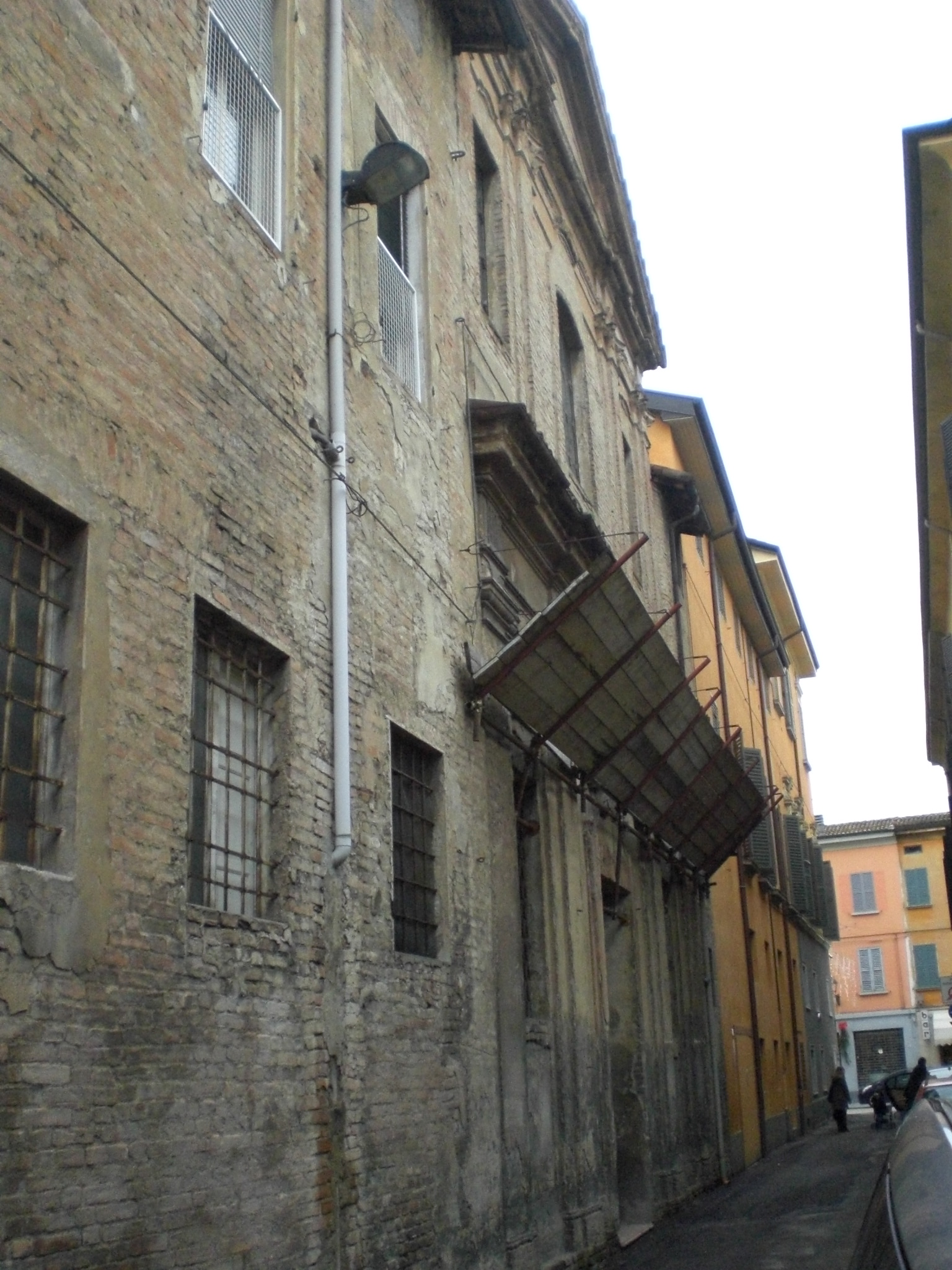
Facade

The Oratory of San Spiridione is a small Baroque-style church or chapel located on Via Nuova in the historic center of Reggio Emilia, region of Emilia Romagna, Italy.

== History and description ==
The year engraved over the portal dates construction of its facade to 1759. The interior during the next decade, was frescoed with stunning quadratura and roof panels by Francesco Vellani and Benedetti. The frescoes in the apse depict an assumption of the Virgin. At the three altars near the apse are canvases depicting St Joseph and St John the Baptist (left); San Spiridione (center), and The Death of Sant'Andrea Avellino (right).

== Bibliography ==
- Piccinini, Guglielmo (1921). Bassi (ed.). Guida di Reggio nell'Emilia. Reggio nell'Emilia.
- Fabbi, Ferdinando (1962). Associazione Turistica Pro Reggio (ed.). Guida di Reggio nell'Emilia-Città del Tricolore. Reggio nell'Emilia.
- Pirondini, Massimo (1982). Bizzocchi (ed.). Reggio Emilia: Guida storico-artistica. Reggio nell'Emilia.
