= Prospero Minghetti =

Italian painter

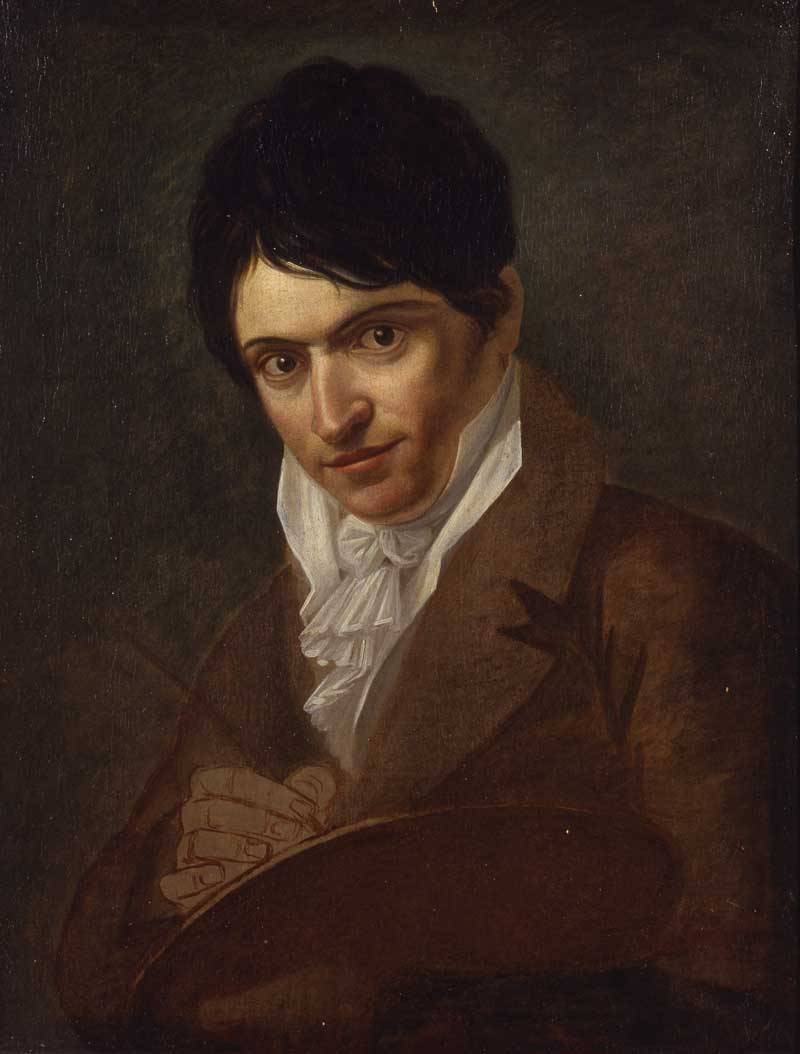
Prospero Minghetti, Self-portrait, 1810 circa, oil on canvas, Reggio Emilia

Prospero Minghetti (January 2, 1786 – February 17, 1853) was an Italian painter.

== Biography ==
He was born in Reggio Emilia. He first trained locally with Francesco Antonio Camuncoli, then Giovanni Battista Frulli and the engraver Francesco Rosaspina in Bologna, then moved to Rome to the circle of Canova and Minardi. In Reggio, he painted a St John the Baptist for Cathedral of Reggio; a Santa Filomena for church of San Giorgio; a San Bartolomeo and other Saints for church of San Francesco; and a San Gaetano and a San Rocco for church of San Rocco. He also painted portraits for Professor Bonaventura Corti, Giuseppe Garofali, Doctor Giovanni Battista Spallanzani, Francesco IV, and Napoleon I. Rocco engraved his designs for a History of Scandiano. His portrait of Conte Governatore Ippolito Malaguzzi Valeri was reproduced in an engraving by Delfino Delfini. His ceiling paintings in the old Reggio theater, now destroyed, were among his masterworks.

Among his pupils were: Francesco Zuccotti (Francesco da Codogno), a painter of the Franciscan Order. When Camuncoli died in 1831, Minghetti served, until his death, as director of the School of Fine Arts in Reggio Emilia. Among the students at the School while he was director were Alfonso and Gaetano Chierici; Carlo Zatti; Antonio Fontanesi, Domenico Pellisi (Pellizzi); Giuseppe Ugolini; Carlo Raimondi; Paolo Aleotti; Pio Canossini; Romualdo Belloli (engraver); and Del Rio (sculptor).
