= San Domenico, Modena =

Baroque Roman Catholic church in Modena, Italy

Coordinates: 44.648936°N 10.927824°E

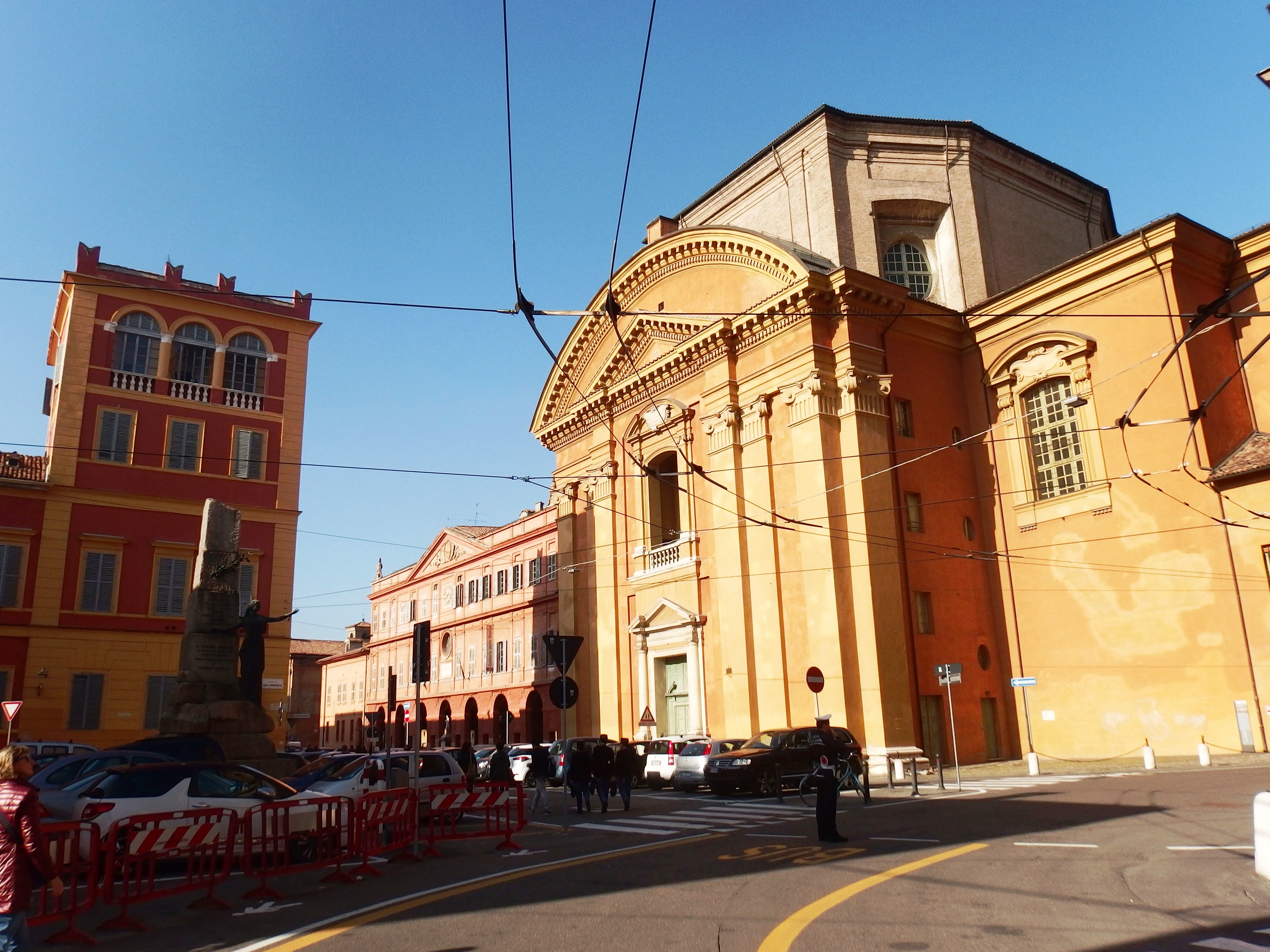
Facade of San Domenico

San Domenico is a Baroque-style, Roman Catholic church facing Piazza Roma across from the Ducal Palace, in central Modena, Italy. Its cupola forms an elliptical dome.

== History ==
A prior church near this site was razed in 1707–1708 to make space for the expansion of the Ducal Palace of Modena. The present church was design by Giuseppe Torri and consecrated in 1731, a few years prior to completion. The layout is oval, and the center has a dome, supported by columns that flank statues of the four Evangelists sculpted in bas-relief by the Giuseppe Maria Mazza. Among the altarpieces, are paintings depicting St Peter Martyr by Francesco Meuti and the St Thomas Aquinas receives crucifix from Angels by Giovanni Battista Cignaroli. The baptistery houses a sculpture in terra-cotta depicting Christ in the House of Mary and Martha by Antonio Begarelli. An inventory from 1770 also mentions works by Ignazio Sther (Ignazio Stern?), Luigi Crespi, Carlo Rizzi, Giacomo Zoboli, Francesco Vellani, Antonio Consetti, and Francesco Monti.
