= Academy of Fine Arts of Parma =

Fine Arts school in Parma, Italy

Coordinates: 44°48′19.3″N 10°19′32.0″E

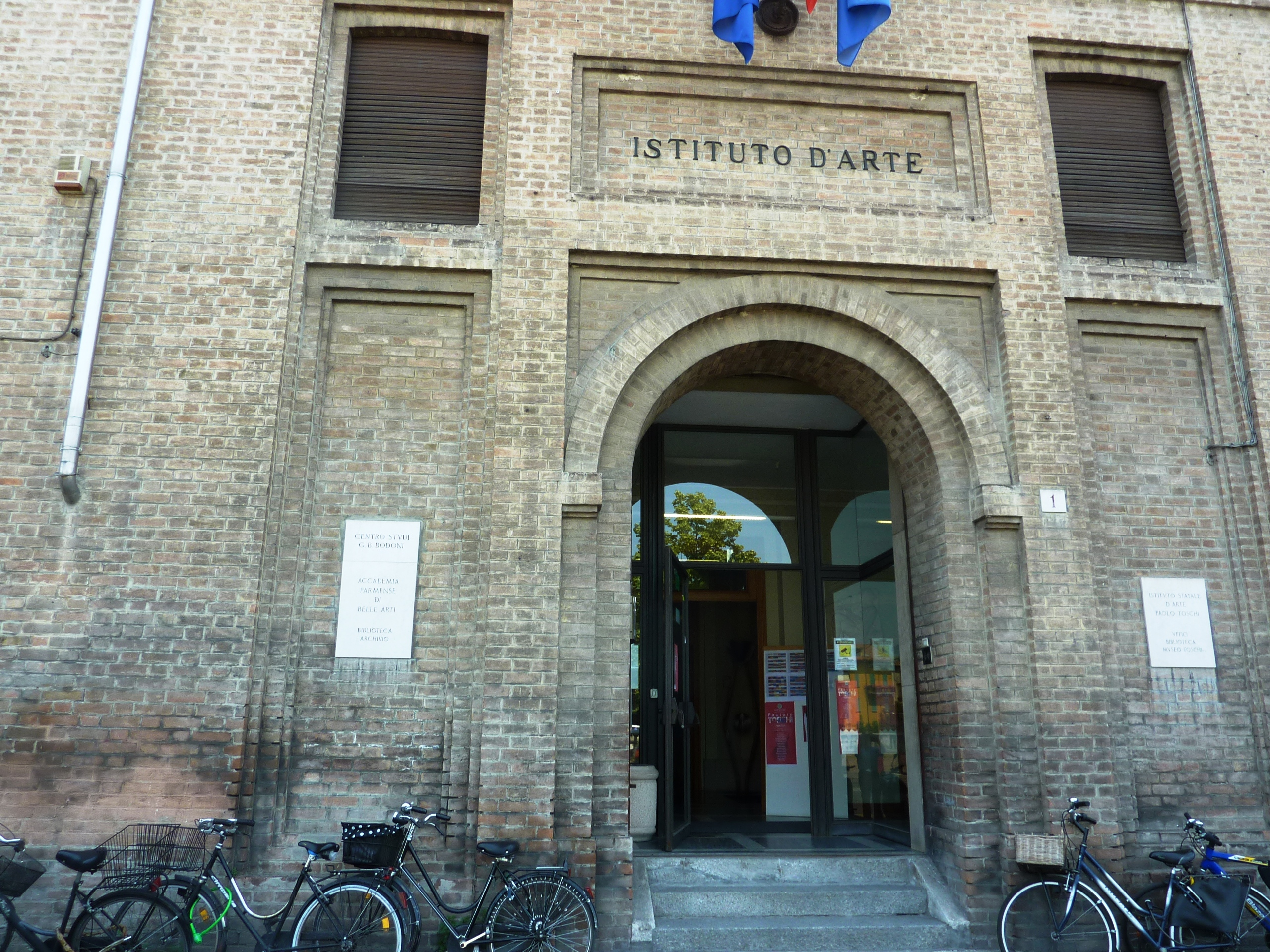
Entrance to the Liceo Paolo Toschi, where the Academy is located. (2011)

The Accademia di Belle Arti di Parma (Academy of Fine Arts of Parma) is an artistic institution in the city of Parma, Italy. It is presently located in a wing of the Palazzo della Pilotta in the center of the city.

== History ==
The Academy originated in 1752, as a private art school called the Scuola Lombarda. Five years later, it was reorganized as an academy under the patronage of Phillip of Bourbon, Duke of Parma. During the Napoleonic occupation of 1803-1814, it was suppressed, but was reinstated under the patronage of Maria Louisa of Austria in 1816. Engraving was made one of the cornerstones of the curriculum in 1822. Paolo Toschi became the Director at that time and served until 1850.

After 1877, it underwent a variety of changes: splitting into several separate departments, including a school of applied industry. In 1923, it was refounded as the Regio Istituto d'arte Paolo Toschi, and in 1936, Regia accademia di belle arti, and in 1973 as an Accademia nazionale di belle arti. Since 2011 it has been called the Liceo Artistico Statale Paolo Toschi. The academy is associated with a series of museums displaying artworks from Parma.
