= Corso Campano =

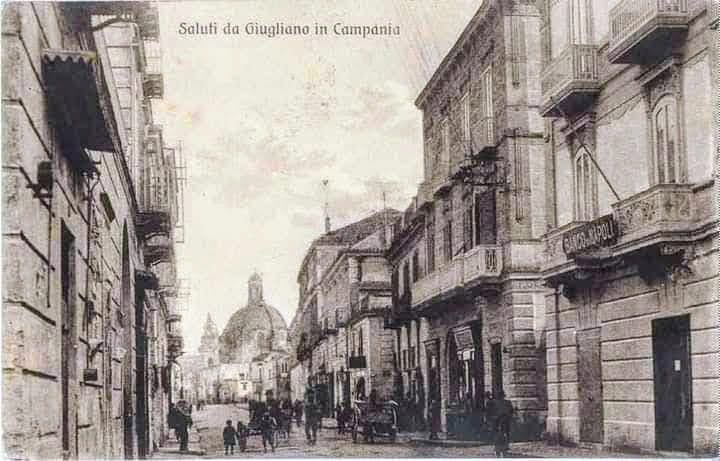
- Corso Campano in Giugliano in Campania, early 20th century
- Type: Street
- Location: Giugliano in Campania, Qualiano
- Postal code: 80014; 80019

Corso Campano (also known as Via Campana) is one of the main thoroughfares of Giugliano in Campania. The section that begins after the historic centre represents the Giugliano stretch of the "new Via Campana", which also crosses other municipalities of the Metropolitan City of Naples (Qualiano, Villaricca, Quarto and Pozzuoli), taking on different names.

Corso Campano proper officially begins near the Church of San Nicola in Giugliano and runs in an east–west direction up to the neighbouring municipality of Qualiano, where it takes the name "Via Campana" and continues as one of the main roads. At the end of the territory of Qualiano, the route crosses the Camaldoli channel via the so-called Ponte di Surriento (Sorrento bridge), built under Ferdinand II of the Two Sicilies, then continues near the hamlet of Villaricca Due in the municipality of Villaricca, partly following the route of the ancient Via Consolare Campana. It then crosses Quarto and reaches the territory of Pozzuoli.

The Corso should not be confused with the ancient Via Campana, from which it takes its name, a Roman road that connected Puteoli (Pozzuoli) with Capua, also crossing the territory of Giugliano in the locality of Piscinelle.

== History ==
Corso Campano, in the historic centre of Giugliano, may originate from a route of the ancient Roman centuriation. It was later paved with basalt slabs. Between 1840 and 1850, during the reign of Ferdinand II of the Two Sicilies, the new Via Campana was built as an extension of the historic urban route. Its construction aimed to improve communications, particularly by connecting the royal road (today a variant of the Via Appia) with the Port of Pozzuoli, in order to promote commercial and agricultural development in the Giugliano area.

The project had a strategic role. From the 1840s onwards, buildings and continuous urban fronts were constructed along the route, contributing to the growth of economic and commercial activities in Giugliano. Corso Campano remains one of the areas where 19th-century Neapolitan urban architecture is most clearly visible.

The monumental beginning of Via Colonne, and by extension of the new Via Campana, is marked by the so-called Colonne di Giugliano, conceived as a gateway to the city. They had both a practical and symbolic function: on one hand they marked the start of the route into the agricultural hinterland, on the other they symbolised the opening of Giugliano to trade and economic relations with the surrounding area.

With the classification of public roads, Via Campana became SP 47, until several sections were transferred to municipal responsibility.

In 2012, an urban redevelopment project for Corso Campano and adjacent squares in the historic centre of Giugliano was launched, with funding of approximately 12.9 million euros.

== Landmarks ==
=== Religious buildings ===
Several historic churches are located along the Corso, including the Collegiate Church of Santa Sofia, founded in the 16th century and remodelled in the 18th century by Ferdinando Sanfelice and Domenico Antonio Vaccaro; the Church of the Annunziata, documented from the 16th century and expanded in the 17th century and the Church of San Nicola, attested from the 13th century and restored between 1785 and 1795.

=== Civil architecture ===
Along Corso Campano there are several buildings of historical and architectural interest catalogued by the Soprintendenza including:

Palazzo Corso Campano, 168: four-storey building with a central courtyard, featuring an arched portal and rusticated ground floor; Palazzo Corso Campano, 181: 19th-century building in tuff with reinforced concrete floors and vesuvian stone paving and Palazzo Corso Campano, 199: two-level building with internal courtyards and an arched portal.
