= Francesco Vellani =

Italian painter (1688–1768)

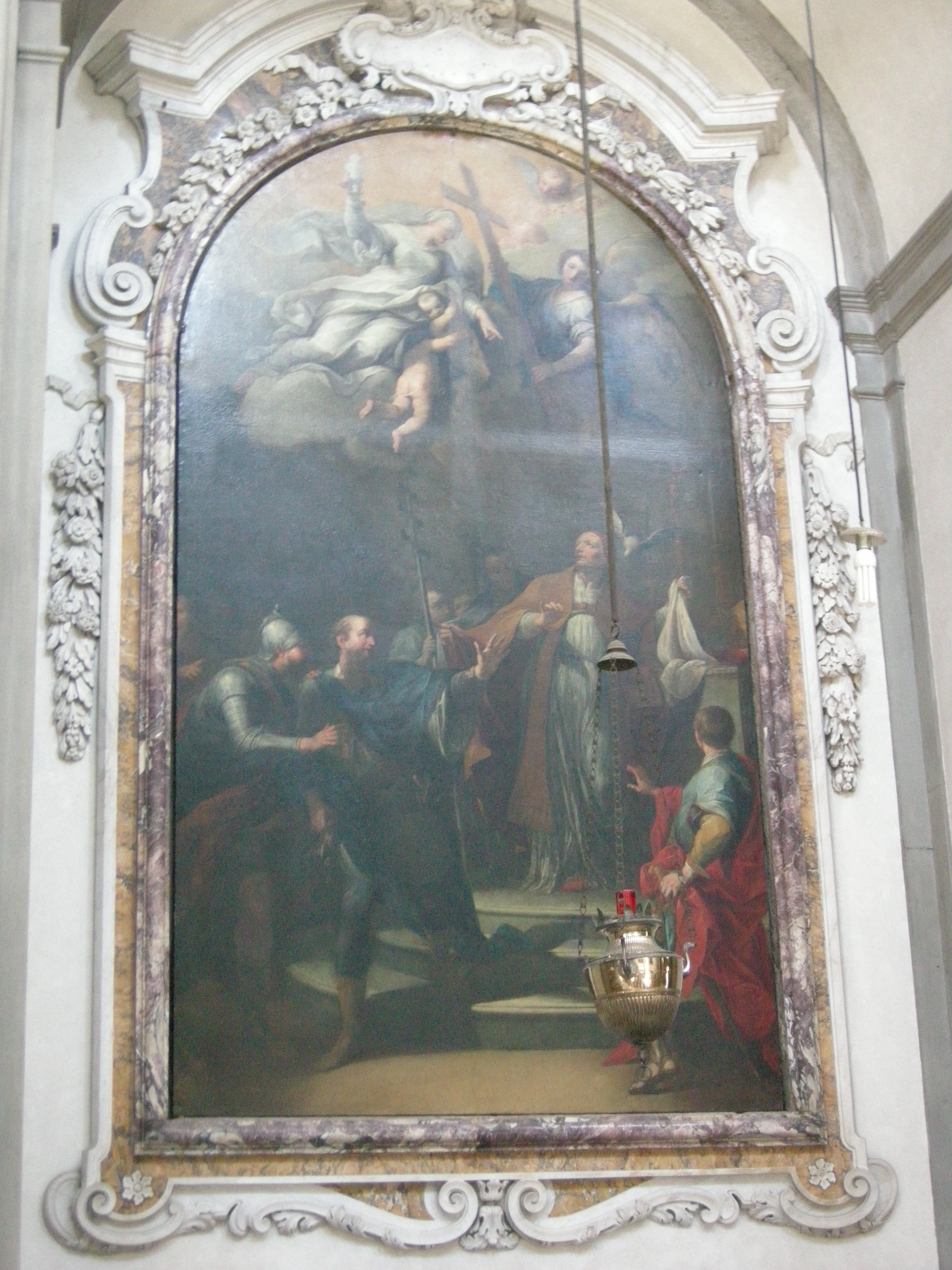
Miracle by St Gregory the Great (painted 1747)

Francesco Vellani (1688–1768) was an Italian painter, active in Modena in a late Baroque style. He mainly painted sacred subjects.

He painted an altarpiece depicting the Assumption of the Virgin for the Cathedral of Modena; an Immaculate Conception for the main altar of the Chiesa Nuova; for the church of the Monache della Visitazione; a St Pius V and St Thomas Acquinas for the church of San Domenico; an altarpiece depicting St John of the Cross for the Church of the Monache Scalze in Modena.

Vellani also completed a number of fresco projects in Reggio Emilia including in The palaces Masdoni and Tirelli, as well as for the Oratory of San Spiridione.
