= Giovanni Rocca (engraver) =

Italian engraver

Giovanni Rocca (20 October 1788 – 1858) was an Italian engraver.

== Biography ==
Angelo Mazza was born in Reggio Emilia the son of Luigi Rocca, a Count, a title Giovanni inherited. His mother, Donna Francesca Saporiti, was from an aristocratic Genoese family.

After a classical education, he traveled to Bologna to study design under Francesco Rosaspina, where he learned wood engraving. In 1816, the Duke of Modena named him professor of engraving at the newly formed Scole di Belle Arti in Reggio. Among his pupils were Carlo Raimondi, Pelli, Canossini, Bosi, Francesco Segnani, Belloli, and others. He gained the official position as Chamberlain to the Duke.

Among his engravings are:

1. Three landscapes (1806).
2. Map of Reggio and Surroundings (1807), in Memorie idrauliche per Dipartimenti del Crostolo, by Lodovico Bolognini. Tip. Torreggiani, 1808.
3. Il Redentore (1811).
4. Scenic designs by Francesco Fontanesi. (1812-1813) .
5. Frontispiece for Dialogo Il Linceo, by Galileo Galilei, (1817) Copy of engraving by Stefano della Bella.
6. La Beata Virgene della Ghiara of Reggio, (1817) based on painting by Lelio Orsi.
7. Portrait of Priest F. Lodovico Iabalot, famous sermon orator, 1818.
8. Innocence based on painting by Léonor Mérimée.
9. Portrait of Galileo originally by B. Benvenuti in Memorie e lettere inedite finora o disperse di Galileo Galilei, ed. GB Venturi. Modena, 1818. Vol. I.
10. Three paintings by A. Ostade.
11. Portrait of the Poet Angelo Mazza of Parma. For his book of poetry.
12. Portrait of the painter Francesco Fontanesi of Reggio, original painting by Giovanni Delera.
13. Portrait of Cardinal Pighini and Toschi; Doctor G. Garofoli; and Abbot B. Corti, for Storia di Scandiano by GB Venturi. Modena, 1822.
14. Portrait of Archduchess Maria Luisa of Austria (1827).
