= Palazzo Tirelli, Parma =

Coordinates: 44.80034°N 10.32871°E

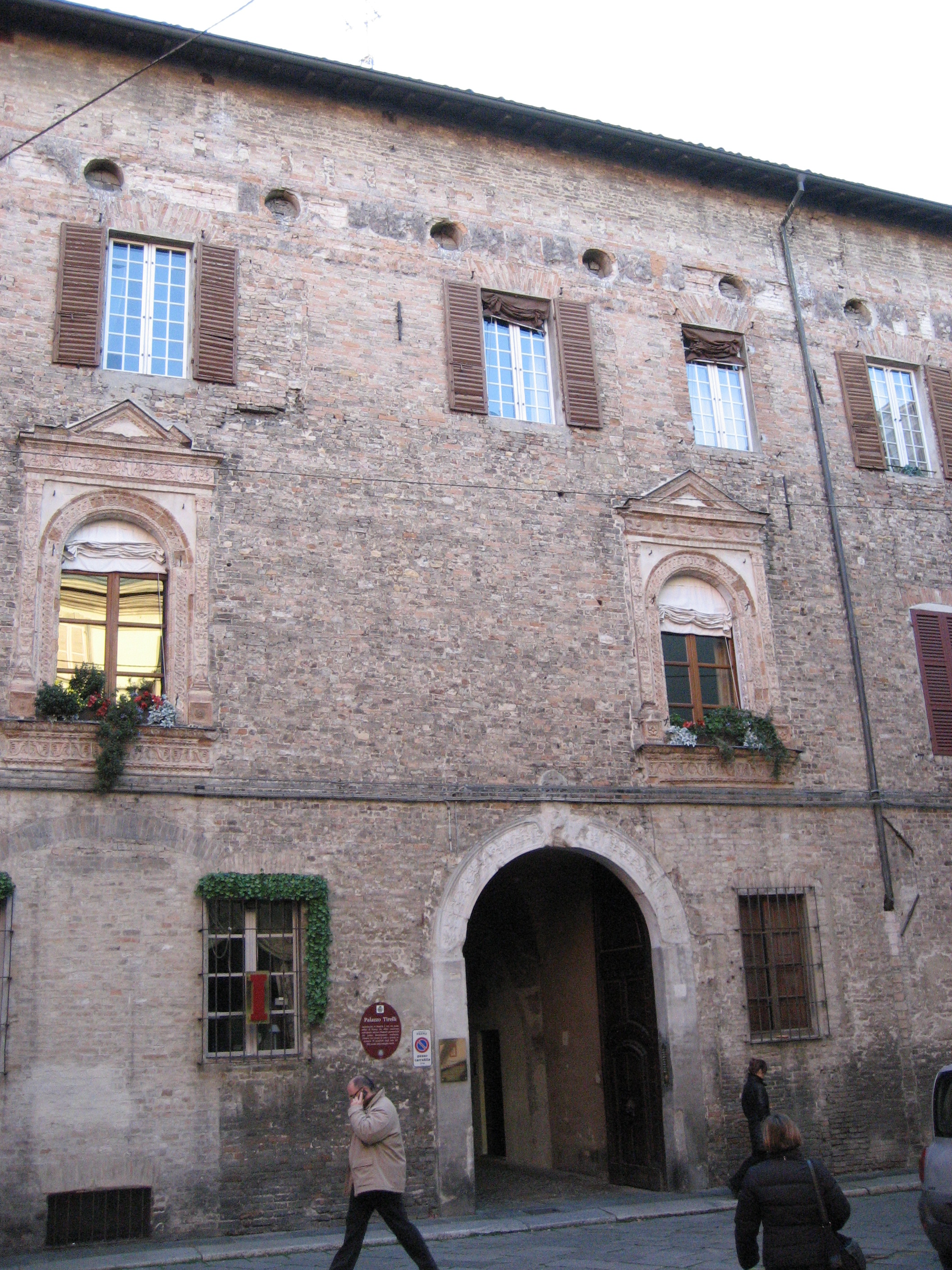

The Palazzo Tirelli is a Renaissance-style urban palace located on Borgo San Vitale #6 in the historical centre of Parma, Italy.

The facade we see today was added on in the 16th century by the Counts of Bajardi. It is notable for the terracotta friezes surrounding the entrance portal and windows. The arch leading to the courtyard stil has fresco decorations on the buttressing spandrels. The palaces was acquired later by the family of the Marquis of Tirelli.
