= Francesco Fontanesi =

Italian painter

Francesco Fontanesi (October 4, 1751 – 1795) was an Italian painter and scenic designer of the Neoclassical style, active mainly in Reggio Emilia and Parma.

== Biography ==
He was born in Reggio Emilia to supportive parents, who fostered a broad classical education. He is said to have trained under Giuseppe Bazzani and Prospero Zanichelli in Reggio. He gravitated towards working in scenic design. In 1772 he decorated for the Melodrama Buffo by Niccolò Piccinni titled L' Astratto or il Giuocatore fortunato.

In May 1776, for a lavish court performance at Parma sponsored by Francesco III of Este, he decorated an Antonio Vivaldi opera, titled Motezuma where he painted the scenes for the two accompanying dances: La Principessa di Tingi and Tenis ed Amalsi. The first dance had scenes with

- 1. Great pavilion adorned with military trophies.
- 2. An army field with pavilions and a city distant.
- 3. Interior of a city with balconies draped with riched tapestries and spectators.
- 4. Gothic room.
- 5. Gothic cellar.
- 6. Military encampment.

The second dance had scenes with

- 1. Country scene with altar.
- 2. Grotto.
- 3. Garden (Delizia) with statues and vases.

From Reggio, he moved to Parma to decorate in 1782 the scenes of the melodrama theatrical work of Alessandro e Timoteo. He continued to work in Parmesan theaters for 15 years. Ercole III would in time raise him to the status of a Cavaliere. In 1785, he moved to Rome, and then, still as a scenic painter, traveled to Livorno, Barga, Pisa, Milan, Florence, Venice, Frankfort, and the Haymarket theater in London. He stayed in Venice for ten years. He was made a member of the Fine Arts academies of Modena, Parma, Venice, Florence, and Bologna. He died in 1795, leaving behind few permanent works.

Among the works, both opera and dances, for which he provided designs in Parma are the following:

- L' Astratto (1772)
- Motezuma (1776)
- Giulio Sabino (1784).
- Il Trionfo di Alessandro (1784)
- Medonte, re di Epiro (1785)
- Vologeso Re de' Parti (1785)
- Idalide (1786)
- Calisto (1786)
- Il Convalescente innamorato (1786)
- Il Demofonte (1787)
- Giasone e Medea (1787)
- L' Inganno felice (1787)
- Il Catone in Utica (1787)
- L'Artaserse (1790)
- La liberazione di Lilla (1790)
- L'Innocenza riconosciuta (1790)
- La morte di Cesare (1790)
- Virginia (1790)
- La vendetta di Nino (1793)
- La Sultana in cimento (1793)
- Il Servo raggiratore (1793)
- Il Cajo Mario (1794)
- La morte di Agamennone (1794)
- Il Tamburo notturno, also called finta Statua del Marito (1794)
- Il Conte di Saldagna (1795)
- Le Feste d'Iside (1795)
- La Bianca de' Rossi (1795)

For the Theater in Reggio, he completed:

- Il Barbiere di Siviglia (1788)
- L'Impresario in angustie (1789)
- Gli Amanti alla prova (1789)
- Gli Sposi rapiti (1789)
- La scuola de Pittori (1789)
- L'Incredulo deluso (1791)
- La bella Pesca trice (1791)
- ll Capriccio Drammatico (1792)
- I Zingari in Fiera (1792)
- Don Giovanni Tenorio (1792)

He was both a friend and competitor of the scenic designer Gonzaga. A short biography recalls him as:

Honest, friendly, liberal, enemy of antagonism, easy to please, hard to take offense, and always equal to his own was the delight of anyone who employing him. Modestly enamored with glory, he ignored the scams of ambitious mediocrity, nor did he, despite his honors, take the dress of arrogance and pomp, which often accompanies them. None found in him a thirst for profit and wealth; indeed he disregarded them, and only adventure gained his approval. He was charming, graceful in conversation, and spent time with every man, and even with wise men, he was as witty as he was jocose; remote from the cynical impudence, and scurrilous sarcasm.
