= Lucia Migliaccio =

- Princess of Partanna; 12th Duchess of Floridia
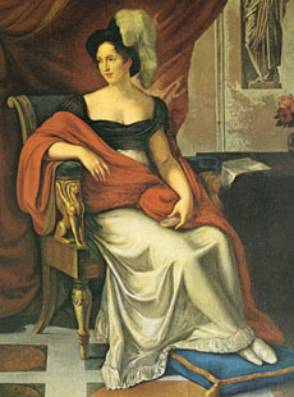
- Portrait by Vincenzo Camuccini, 19th-century
- Born: 19 July 1770; Syracuse, Kingdom of Sicily
- Died: 26 April 1826 (aged 55); Naples, Kingdom of the Two Sicilies
- Spouse: Don Benedetto Maria Grifeo, 8th Prince of Partanna (m. 1791; died 1812) Ferdinand I of the Two Sicilies (m. 1814; d. 1825)
- Issue: Don Giuseppe Grifeo; Donna Marianna Grifeo; Don Vincenzo Grifeo; Don Leopoldo Grifeo; Don Luigi Grifeo
- House: Bourbon-Two Sicilies (by marriage)
- Father: Don Vincenzo Migliaccio, 8th Duke of Floridia e San Donato
- Mother: Donna Dorotea Borgia

Lucia Migliaccio, suo jure 12th Duchess of Floridia (19 July 1770 – 26 April 1826) was the second wife of Ferdinand I of the Two Sicilies. Their marriage was morganatic and Lucia was never a queen consort.

On 4 April 1791, Lucia married Don Benedetto Maria Grifeo, 8th Prince of Partanna. They had seven children together. However, Benedetto died in 1812. Two years later, on 27 November 1814, Lucia married the King of the Two Sicilies, Ferdinand I. The two had met frequently at the royal court. They had no children together, and Ferdinand died in 1825. Their marriage caused a scandal at court, and Ferdinand’s eldest son from his first marriage with Archduchess Maria Carolina of Austria, Francis, tried to persuade his father not to marry Lucia.

== Family ==
Lucia was a daughter of the Sicilian nobleman Don Vincenzo Migliaccio, 8th Duke of Floridia, and his wife, Donna Dorotea Borgia dei Marchesi del Casale, and inherited her father's dukedom. Her mother came from Syracuse, Sicily. Lucia Migliaccio had several sons and a daughter, Lucia Borbone, who married Salvatore Sagnelli. Both of them are buried in Maddaloni, near Caserta.

== Marriages ==
She married first Don Benedetto Maria III Grifeo, 8th Prince di Partanna. They had five children:

- Donna Marianna Grifeo
- Don Vincenzo Grifeo (29 August 1791 – 3 April 1846)
- Don Giuseppe Grifeo (1794 – 1857)
- Donna Dorotea (1795 – 10 November 1850)
- Don Leopoldo Grifeo (17 August 1796 – 1871)
- Don Luigi Grifeo (1800 – 18 August 1860)

On 27 November 1814, Lucia married Ferdinand I of the Two Sicilies, also known as Ferdinand III of Sicily, in Palermo. The bride was forty-four years old and the groom sixty-three. Their marriage created a scandal as it took place less than three months from 8 September 1814, the death of his first wife Queen Maria Carolina of Austria. Protocol rules required at least one-year period of mourning. By then, Ferdinand had already practically abdicated his power by naming his eldest son Prince Francis as his regent and delegating most decisions to him. His deceased queen, Maria Carolina, herself had been considered the de facto ruler of Sicily until 1812. Lucia after her marriage had very limited influence and little interest in politics.

Ferdinand was restored to the throne of the Kingdom of Naples by right of his victory on the Battle of Tolentino (3 May 1815) over Joachim Murat. On 8 December 1816 he merged the thrones of Sicily and Naples under the name of the throne of the Two Sicilies, with Francis still serving as his regent and Lucia as his morganatic spouse.

Ferdinand continued to rule until his death on 4 January 1825. Lucia survived him by a year and three months. She was buried in the Church of San Ferdinando, Naples.
