= Piperno =

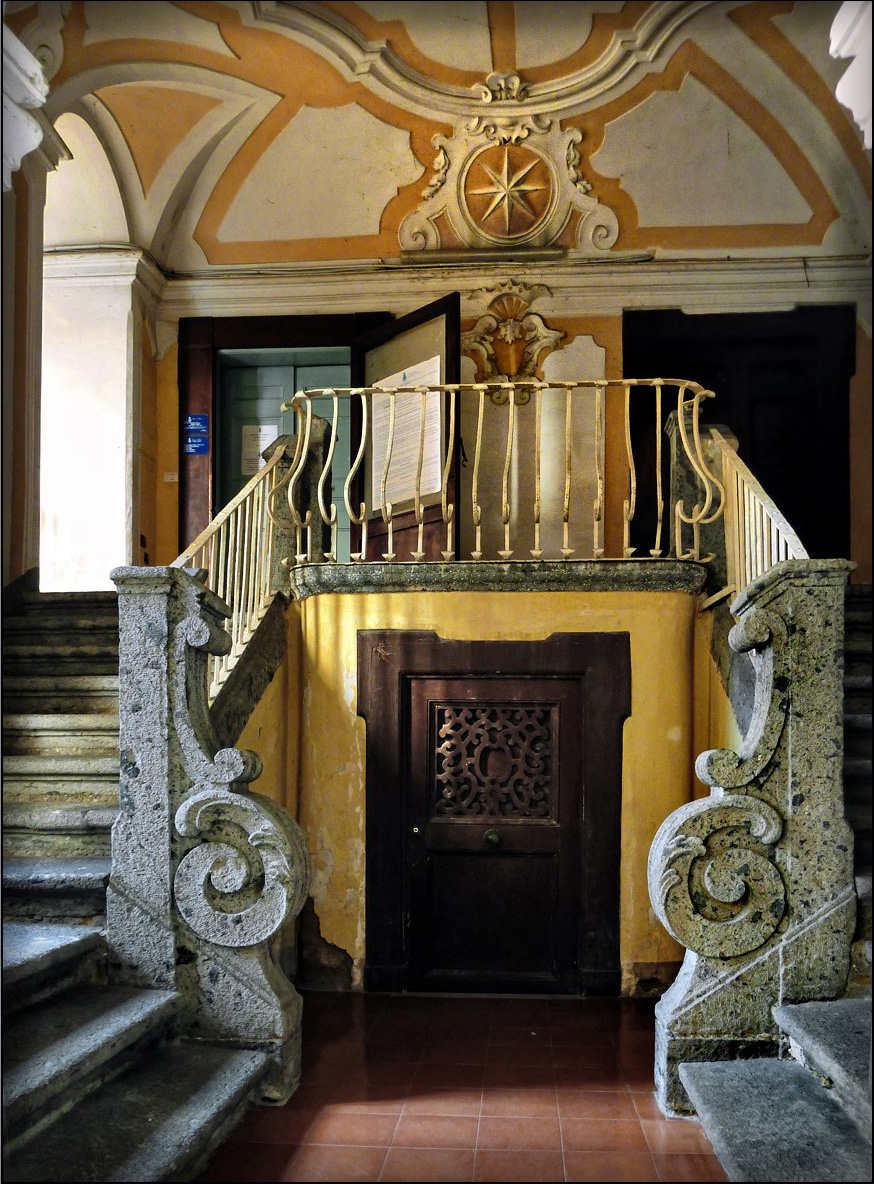
The staircase, in Piperno, to the mezzanine floor of Villa Meola in Portici

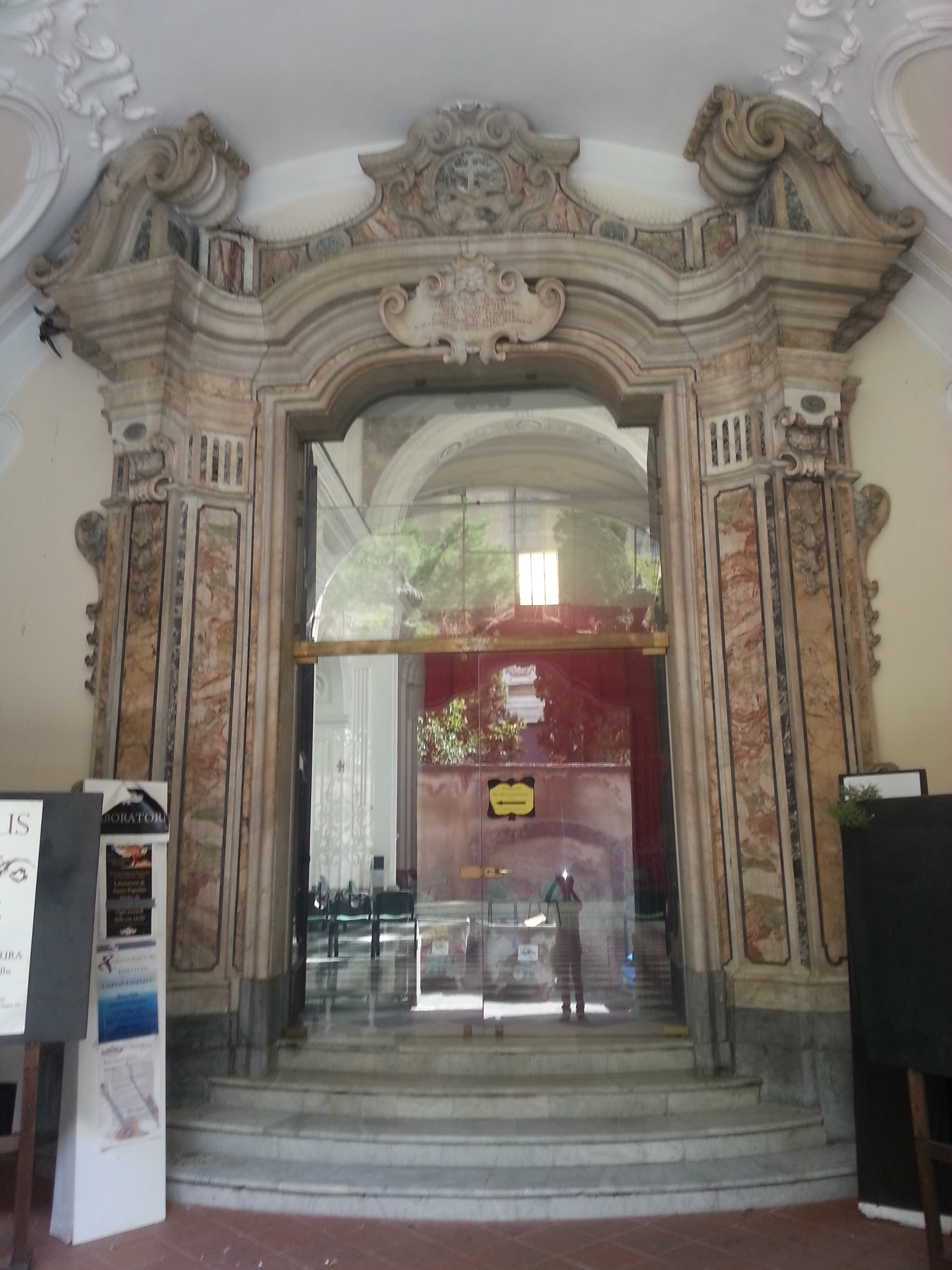
Piperno in Church of San Francesco delle Monache, Naples

Piperno is a particular variety of dimension stone of igneous origin, a tuff or ignimbrite, native to areas in Southern Italy that have been affected by explosive volcanic activity. Piperno abounds in Campania; the areas from which it was obtained were the city of Quarto, Soccavo, Pianura and Nocera Inferiore in the supervolcano region of the Phlegraean Fields. The Piperno layer, with the overlying Breccia Museo, is clearly visible at the base of the Camaldoli hill, in the Soccavo and Verdolino areas.

This type of ignimbrite tuff takes on a particular texture characterised by the orientation of lenticular concentrations of grey colour, called flames, immersed in a matrix of the same colour but lighter. Piperno should not be confused with Neapolitan Yellow Tuff; welded piperno tuff is more durable than yellow tuff, which poses conservation challenges.

Piperno rock is not easy to extract, and is helped by underground separation of the large blocks that are subsequently worked; it is resistant to the wear and tear of atmospheric agents and for this reason it has been widely used for the cladding of buildings in Naples. Currently it is no longer extracted as the underground quarries in Pianura and Soccavo are exhausted.

Campanian piperno is a cousin to peperino tuff from Lazio.
