= Prospero Zannichelli =

Italian painter

Prospero Zannichelli (1698–1772) was a painter from Reggio Emilia, Italy, who was active in Reggio Emilia, Alessandria, Piacenza, and Turin. He was known as a painter of landscapes and decorative scenery.
