= Via Campana =

Major road of the Roman Empire

The Via Campana (Italian - Via Antica Consolare campana) was one of the main roads of the Roman Empire. It begins at the Flavian Amphitheatre at Pozzuoli and ran through several ancient craters, passing the town of Qualiano and ending in Ancient Capua at junction with the via Appia.

In XIX was created the New via Campana that has similar path but it ends at junction with the diramation of via Appia in the town of Giugliano.

Four kilometres from Pozzuoli it crosses the craters of the Quarto Flegreo that give their name to the nearby town of Quarto and cross through the Montagna Spaccata, literally a cut through the wall of the crater made by the Romans to allow the road to cross to the opposite side of the crater (where the road climbs along the slopes instead). The Montagna Spaccata passage is now perfectly preserved and used as the main road in and out of the town. The bricks put in by the Romans to prevent the crater wall from collapsing can still be seen in excellent states of preservation all along the passage. Various Roman catacombs and necropolises can also be seen along the route.
