= Agro giuglianese =

- Territory
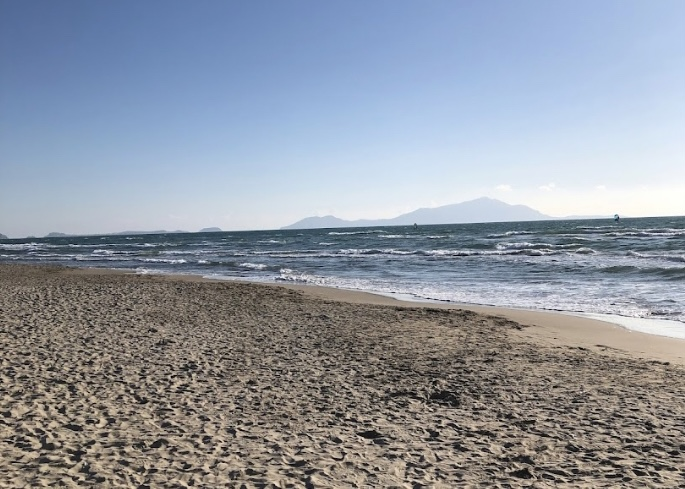
- Licola, Giugliano in Campania, Italy

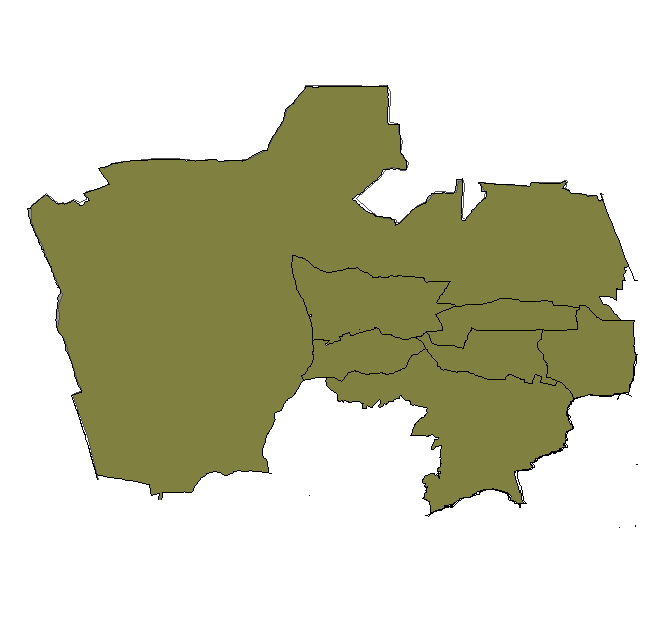
- Agro giuglianese with its municipal administrative divisions

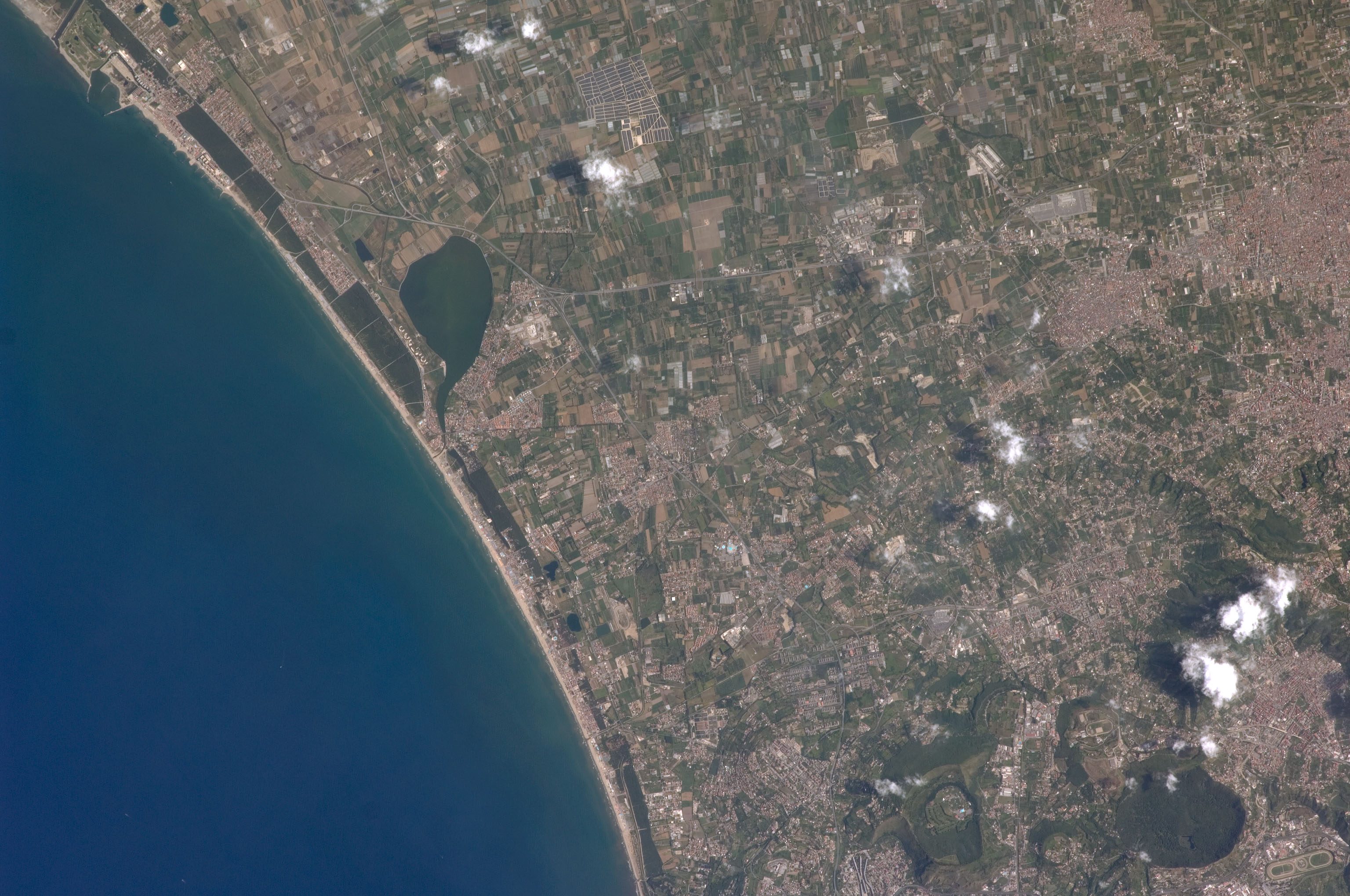
- Satellite

- Location within Italy
- Coordinates: 40°56′N 14°12′E
- Country: Italy
- Regions: Campania
- Provinces: Metropolitan city of Naples
- Municipalities: Giugliano in Campania, Qualiano, Villaricca, Marano di Napoli, Mugnano di Napoli and Calvizzano
- Named for: Giugliano in Campania

Area
  - Land: 137.65 km^{2} (53.15 sq mi)

Population
  - Estimate (2017): 288,122
- Time zone: UTC+1
  - Summer (DST): UTC+2

Agro giuglianese is an area of the Metropolitan City of Naples, Campania, Italy.

The territory is made up of the municipalities of Giugliano in Campania, Qualiano, Villaricca, Marano di Napoli, Mugnano di Napoli and Calvizzano, once with a predominantly agricultural economy, which revolve around Giugliano, the largest and most important center, as of 2017 it had some 124,000 inhabitants, making it the most populated Italian city that is not a provincial capital.

== Economy ==
The economy of the area continues to be agricultural, although there are several industrial plants areas, such as Ponte Riccio ASI near Qualiano. The products of the markets located in Giugliano, Marano and Melito reach numerous centres in Italy and Europe.

== Sources ==
- Aspetti territoriali e testimonianze storico architettoniche dell'area giuglianese Sabatino Giovanni AbbiAbbe edizioni Giugliano in Campania 2005
