= Licola =

Licola may refer to:

- Licola, Italy, a hamlet of Giugliano in Campania and Pozzuoli, Naples, Italy
- Licola, Victoria, a small town in Australia
