= Villa Rica =

Villa Rica may refer to:

- Villa Rica, Georgia, United States
- Villa Rica, Cauca, Colombia
- Villa Rica District, Peru
- Villa Rica, Paraguay
- Veracruz, Veracruz, Mexico, originally Villa Rica de la Vera Cruz

== See also ==
- Villaricca, Italy
- Villarica (disambiguation)
- Villarrica (disambiguation)
