= Villarrica =

Villarrica may refer to:

== Places ==
Chile

- Lake Villarrica
- Villarrica, Chile
- Villarrica (volcano)
- Villarrica National Park

Colombia

- Villarrica, Colombia, a municipality in the department of Tolima

Paraguay

- Villarrica, Paraguay, a city in the department of Guairá

== See also ==
- Villa Rica (disambiguation)
- Villaricca, an Italian commune in the province of Naples
- Villarica (disambiguation)
