= Licola (Italy) =

- Frazione
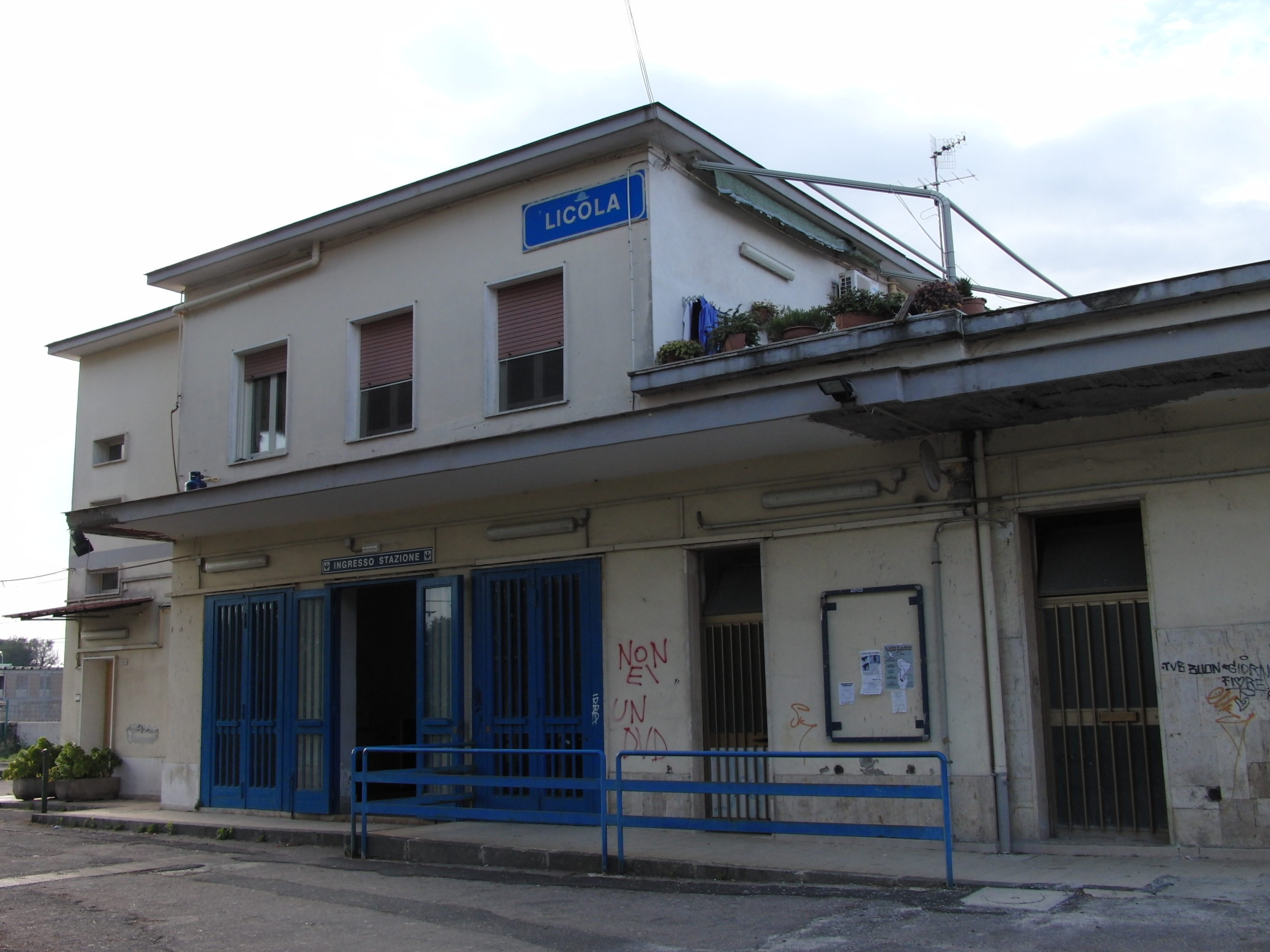
- Licola station building

- Location of Licola in Italy
- Coordinates: 40°52′12.1″N 14°3′37.7″E
- Country: Italy
- Region: Campania
- Province: Naples (NA)
- Comune: Giugliano in Campania; Pozzuoli
- Elevation: 9 m (30 ft)

Population (2011)
  - Total: 5,000
- Demonym: Licolensi
- Time zone: UTC+1 (CET)
  - Summer (DST): UTC+2 (CEST)
- Postal code: 80014 (Licola, Giugliano in Campania); 80078 (Licola, Pozzuoli)
- Dialing code: (+39) 081
- Patron saint: St. Procolo, St. Iulianus, Madonna della Pace
- Saint day: 16 November, 27 January

Licola is a land in the province of Naples which takes its name from Lago di Licola, a lake which formerly occupied part of the area. The current population of Licola ranges between 4000 and 5000. Licola is a strip of land facing the sea, and is roughly three kilometers by ten kilometers in size. It begins at the foot of Mount Cuma and ends in Marina di Varcaturo.

The Licola area is divided between two municipalities. In particular, the southern part is divided between the villages Licola Center (also known as Licola Village) and Licola Lido (also known as Lido di Licola) of the municipality (or comune) of Pozzuoli, bordering the Arco Felice section of the municipality. The northern part, Licola Mare, is part of the hamlet of Varcaturo, which is a section of the municipality of Giugliano, part of the constituency of Licola-Lago Patria. The town revolves around Piazza San Massimo, which is the oldest square in the town.

== History ==
The town of Licola, together with the neighboring towns of Lago Patria and Varcaturo, comprise the territory formerly inhabited by the Osci in the 5th to 4th century BC. The Osci founded many cities in Campania, including Liternum, the remains of which are located just north of Licola. This town experienced a remarkable development, especially during the Roman Republic and Roman Empire.

The first reference to Liternum dates from Roman times: the historian Livy wrote that in 194 BC thirty Roman families set up a colony there. Later many additional colonies were added and in the 2nd century Liternum was already among the most prosperous prefectures of the "fertile countryside" of Campania (Latin: Campania felix). The archaeological remains of the forum, temple, church and theater of Liternum are preserved from this period.

Liternum was also one of the four oldest cities in Campania in which Christianity was introduced and widely practiced, in the 1st and 2nd century AD.

In the 1930s and 1940s, the ONC (Opera Nazionale Combattenti, ‘National Soldiers Works’, a welfare agency formed aftermath of the disastrous Italian defeat at the Battle of Caporetto) directed a large agricultural business in Licola. With the start of World War II, this business ceased activity and was subsequently dismantled.

In the 1960s and 1970s Licola emerged as a significant tourist attraction. After the Irpinia earthquake in 1980 and the bradyseism of 1982, however, many displaced people sought shelter in Licola and its tourist industry went into a period of decline. A strong revival in tourism occurred subsequently in the 1990s.

Numerous quarries for the extraction of sand were opened in the 1970s and 1980s. These have now all been closed owing to environmental and archeological regulations imposed by the Cultural and Environment Heritage Ministry and the Archeological Heritage Ministry.

== Geography ==
=== Overview ===
Licola is located on the coast of the Mediterranean Sea. It is bordered to the north by Varcaturo and Lago Patria, hamlets within Giugliano, to the east by Monterusciello and Monte Grillo, and to the south by the town of Bacoli, while to the west lies the Tyrrhenian Sea. The morphological and geological aspects of Licola are substantially the same as those of Cuma which it borders. The coast has an unusually straight contour in its north-south extension due to the erosion of the walls of tuff spread all throughout zone.

The dunes of Licola can be separated into two distinct zones: a first, outer layer subject to marine erosion, and a second strip that is stabilized by vegetation. Local vegetation consists of halophilic plants on the coast, while the interior is characterized by Mediterranean scrub. There is increasing interest in these natural habitats, as it is believed that some of the local flora are native only to this area.

Further inland, the environment supports a system of dense vegetation, made up of oak forest on a dry, sandy soil, which was repeatedly cited by Roman authors for the pleasant atmosphere it produces. There was once a lake (Lake Licola) in this interior region, before the land was reclaimed. The reclaimed land is now used for agriculture, typically vineyards and orchards, due to the high fertility of the soil.

=== Climate ===
Licola is subject to the typical Mediterranean climate with hot summers, dry winters, and temperate rainy periods in autumn and spring. Over 75% of the days in an average year are sunny, and its climatic classification refers to the town of Pozzuoli as class "C". The Professional Institute of State for Agriculture and the Environment (IPAA) has established an advanced station for weather data collection that monitors the climate of Licola with extreme precision. The accompanying table shows the figures for 2006:

Month	Jan	Feb	Mar	Apr	May	Jun	Jul	Aug	Sep	Oct	Nov	Dec	Annual
Average maximum (°C)	12.1	13.1	14.2	17	23	25.6	29.7	28	25.6	23.6	18.3	15.5	20.7
Average minimum (°C)	4.3	5.2	7.6	10	13.4	15.5	19.8	19.3	16.6	13.8	7.8	7.3	11.8
Rain (mm)	72.6	56.4	88.6	37.8	17.8	65.8	35.8	54.6	163.6	21.1	47.5	58.4	720.3
Source: Istituto Professionale di Stato per l’Agricoltura e l’Ambiente “Filippo Silvestri

=== Territory ===
The territory of Licola preserves not only an invaluable archaeological heritage but also popular and religious traditions and a significant commercial, cultural and tourist function.

According to the latest archaeological findings, which emerged during excavations carried out by the Archeological Heritage Authority, it is thought that the territory of Licola covers an old Roman road, the Domitian Way, and the remains of an amphitheater of the same period whose precise location has yet to be discovered.

The important archeological site of the town of Liternum (containing the tomb of Scipio Africanus) is located about one kilometer north of Licola, in Lago Patria (where a lake of the same name is located which has the unusual characteristic of being heart-shaped). It was there that Scipio chose to remain in voluntary exile from Rome and where he founded a Roman colony along with his most trusted legionaries and their families.

To the south, Cumae preserves an invaluable acropolis as well as the Cave of the Sibyl, famous for the prophesies uttered there by the Cumaean Sibyl, while slightly further south lies the magnificent Arco Felice Vecchio.

Licola now contains the Regional Park of the Phlegraean Fields (Campi Flegrei), which preserves the dunes and habitat specific to the area and has been declared a Site of Importance to the Community and a Special Protection Zone owing to the rarity of the species living there, such as the sea daffodil. North Licola is in the Natural Reserve of "Foce Volturno - Costa di Licola".

Along with the remains of the Cumaean Acropolis, the Regional Park of the Phlegraen Fields also contains an area of rare Mediterranean evergreen forest, known to the ancients as the Silva Gallinaria.

Numerous species of both migrating and non-migrating birds—many endangered—take refuge in the marshes and green areas of Licola. Most notably, the heron has returned to the area, while on the beaches there have been sightings of loggerhead sea turtles.

The seabed along the Licola-Cumae beach, between the island of Ischia and Ventotene, contains a submarine canyon, the Canyon of Cumae, which provides a home for cetaceans such as dolphins and rorquals.

== Economy ==
The economy of Licola is based substantially on agriculture and tourism. In the region, there are highly developed orchards and vineyards, which thanks to the fertility of the soil provide good quality crops. Of special note, this area is home to the falanghina vineyards Campi Flegrei and pedirosso Campi Flegrei. The services sector is based primarily on tourism, showing a remarkable development of seaside resorts and hotel facilities. Campsites and hotels provide about 2,500 beds. In addition, the area is home to many tourist attractions, restaurants, swimming pools, water parks, discos and resorts. These attract a considerable flow of people from the entire provinces of Naples and Caserta, with peak seasons being spring and summer.

== Transport ==
The main routes into Licola are rail and road transport. The first is the Circumflegrea railway, a suburban railway linking the coast of Licola – Cuma with the center of Naples; it is considered the first underground railway to be built in Italy. Construction of the line, which started in 1948, proceeded very slowly, and the railway dd not reach Marina di Licola until 1968. The railway is run by EAV. Another company that manages the urban transport by bus is the CTP.
