= Lake Patria =

Lake in Italy

Coordinates: 40°56′N 14°02′E

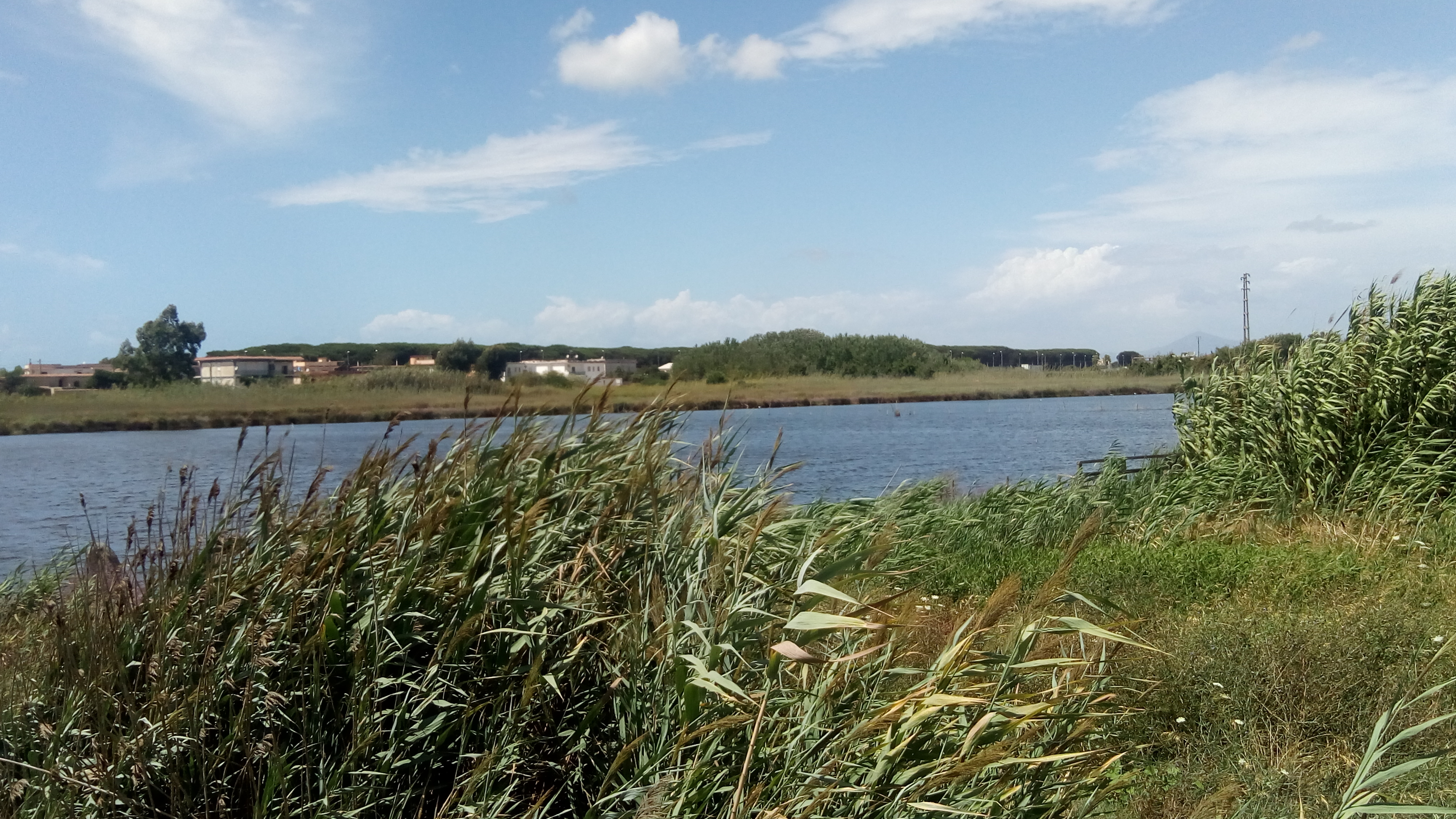
View of the shore of Lake Patria

Lake Patria or Lago Patria is the largest coastal lake in Campania, with an area of 2 km^{2}. It is located in the municipality of Giugliano in Campania, in the frazione called precisely Lago Patria, and partly in the municipality of Castel Volturno, in the province of Caserta. It has a characteristic heart shape. It is the southernmost of the Pontine lakes.

At the time of the Latins it was known as Literna Palus and the city of Liternum extended on the south bank. In ancient times, especially before the hydraulic works of the 17th century, it extended further north, with a large marshy area. In fact, the Clanis, which in ancient times flowed into Lake Patria, was artificially irregular and led to flow 9 km further north, to Pinetamare. Today it is fed by modest freshwater streams and some springs, but also by a canal, now cemented, which connects it to the sea and allows the entry of salt water. The surface is located about 4 m above sea level.

Lake Patria can be considered a coastal lake due to its position close to the sea, the modest depth (on average 1.5 m) and the salinity of the waters. Lake Patria hosts a rich fauna of marsh birds and the fish fauna is also very differentiated. Since 1999 it has been part of the Foce Volturno - Costa di Licola Nature Reserve, a regional protected area that has merged and enlarged previous protected areas.

== Sport ==
Rowing is regularly practiced on its surface and the Circolo del Remo e della Vela Italia has transferred its structure relating to this sport from its original Neapolitan headquarters in Santa Lucia. In 1963 it hosted the rowing competitions of the IV Mediterranean Games.
