= Villarica =

Villarica may refer to:

- Villarica (moth), a genus of moths
- Villarica, Cotabato, a barangay of Midsayap, Philippines

== People ==
- Henry Villarica, politician and attorney
- Linabelle Villarica, incumbent mayor of Meycauayan

== See also ==
- Villa Rica (disambiguation)
- Villaricca, Italy
- Villarrica (disambiguation)
