= Mignogna =

Mignogna is an Italian surname. Notable people with the surname include:

- Eduardo Mignogna (1940–2006), Argentine film director and screenwriter
- Joseph Lawrence Mignogna (born 1976), American artist
- Nicola Mignogna (1808–1870), Italian politician
- Vic Mignogna (born 1963), American voice actor and musician
