= Conrad of Antioch =

Italian noble

Conrad of Antioch (Italian: Corrado d'Antiochia; born 1240/41, died after 1312) was a scion of an illegitimate branch of the imperial Staufer dynasty and a nobleman of the Kingdom of Sicily. He was the eldest son of Frederick of Antioch, imperial vicar of Tuscany, and Margherita di Poli. He was thus a grandson of the Emperor Frederick II (reigned 1220–50), a nephew of King Manfred of Sicily (1258–66) and cousin of King Conradin (1266–68). His surname, which is contemporary, comes from his paternal grandmother, a mistress of Frederick II from Antioch. He may be called "Conrad I" to distinguish him from his descendants with the same given name.

Conrad's activities were mainly confined to the north of the Kingdom of Sicily and to the Papal State. Under Manfred, he governed several counties and held numerous castles in fief in the region of Abruzzo. He fought as Manfred's representative to re-assert Staufer control of central Italy. After Manfred's death, he was forced into exile by the Angevin conquest. In exile Conradin elevated him in rank by granting him the title Prince of Abruzzo and he took part in Conradin's attempt to regain the kingdom. Following the failure of this in 1268, he became a prisoner-of-war until 1272. The remaining forty years of his life were mostly spent quietly at his castle in Anticoli, save for the years 1282–86, at the start of the War of the Vespers, when he launched several invasions and raids into Abruzzo. These ultimately failed to shake Angevin control.

== Early life ==
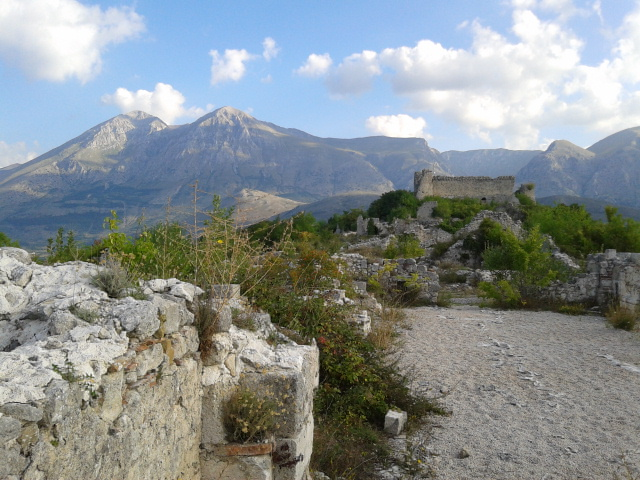
Ruins of the castle of Alba today

Conrad was born probably in the same year as his parents' marriage (1240) or in the following year. His father died in 1256 and he inherited the counties of Alba, Celano and Loreto, as well as numerous feudal possessions the Ruffi Mountains, around the Aniene river and in the Marsica. One of these, the town of Anticoli Corrado, today bears his name. He also received Saracinesco, Mola, Sambuci, Rocca dei Sorci, Rocca dei Murri and the castle of Piglio.

Nothing is known of Conrad's childhood or youth. He is first mentioned in the Chronicon Lauretanum for the year 1258, when he was already exercising the captaincy of Abruzzo. He attended the parliament convoked by his uncle at Foggia in September and October, where his possession of the counties of Alba, Celano and Loreto was confirmed, and he was given the county of Abruzzo as well as some small estates in Calabria.

At some point between 1258 and 1261, Conrad married Beatrice Lancia, daughter of Galvano Lancia, grand marshal of Sicily. They had five sons and three daughters. Two of his sons, Bartolomeo (1260–1311) and Francesco (1265–1320), held the office of archbishop of Palermo in succession; two of his daughters, Costanza (1270–1304) and Giovanna (1280–1352), married the brothers Bartolomeo I and Cangrande I della Scala, respectively. His youngest daughter, Giovanna, was the last known patrilineal descendant of the Staufer family.

== Vicariate in Ancona and Spoleto ==
In 1256, Manfred, still only acting as regent on behalf of his nephew Conradin, asserted Conradin's rights to the Romagna (Romandiola), the March of Ancona and the Duchy of Spoleto, which the Papacy also claimed. At a general colloquy in Naples in October 1261, Manfred, now king, appointed Conrad his vicar general in the March, the Duchy and the Romagna and charged him with leading an invasion to capture the disputed provinces. The army he was given was composed almost entirely of Saracens from Lucera.

Conrad invaded the Duchy of Spoleto in the summer of 1262. His assault on Spoleto itself failed, but with the help of the town of Matelica he was successful in taking the hilltop fortress of Castel Santa Maria from the city of Camerino. He proceeded to win over to Manfred's allegiance most of the towns of the March of Ancona through a combination of threats, donations and granting of privileges. In December 1263, after more than a year of campaigning, he was captured by trickery while besieging Treia and imprisoned in the dungeon of the tower. His father-in-law led several unsuccessful assaults on the town in an effort to force his release, but succeeded in sneaking Conrad out of the town in January 1264. There was suspicion that the podestà, Baglione Baglioni, had been corrupted, a charge Pope Clement IV was still leveling in 1266.

Conrad remained in the March of Ancona throughout 1264, for which he was excommunicated by Pope Urban IV. In 1265, he returned to his fiefs in Abruzzo.

== Angevin invasion of Sicily ==
In 1265, with an invasion of Sicily by Count Charles of Anjou imminent, Conrad conferred with Manfred at Lucera. He then returned to Abruzzo to raise troops. He was still there when Charles invaded the kingdom and defeated Manfred at the Battle of Benevento on 26 February 1266. Conrad had several clashes with Charles's supporters in Abruzzo, but with Manfred's death in battle he decided to go into hiding in the mountains with his father-in-law, Galvano, and Galvano's brother, Federico.

Although Conrad and the Lancia brothers offered to submit to Charles, their offer was rejected. They tried to flee to Calabria, but this proved impossible with Charles's spies scouring the mountains. The fugitives then crossed into Papal territory and appealed to Clement IV, offering complete submission if the pope would intercede on their behalf with Charles. Clement agreed and, with Charles's approval, lifted Conrad's excommunication. According to the Chronicon Lauretanum, however, Charles ignored the pope's offers of mediation. He eventually captured Conrad and imprisoned him in a secret location.

In January 1267, Conrad escaped from his prison along with a companion, Giovanni di Mareri. He took refuge in his castle at Saracinesco. Charles threatened to kill Conrad's daughter Beatrice, whom he had taken as a hostage while her father was still negotiating his submission, but was dissuaded by the imminent arrival of an army under Conradin, the Staufer claimant to the kingdom of Sicily.

== Conradin's invasion ==
In October 1267, Conrad met his cousin, Conradin, at Verona while the latter was preparing his advance into Sicily. He performed the act of homage to Conradin and offered his services. In return, Conradin issued a charter confirming to Conrad all the fiefs he had held under Manfred and granting him the new title Prince of Abruzzo (princeps Aprutii). Despite the honour and the rank it implied (highest below the king), Conrad does not appear to have ever used the title.

In November, Henry of Castile, the senator of Rome and leader of the pro-Staufer Ghibelline party in Rome, arrested the leaders of the pro-Angevin Guelph faction and had them imprisoned in Saracinesco under the watch of Conrad's mother, Margherita, and wife, Beatrice. In response to this, on 25 April 1268, Clement IV issued the bull Die coena Domini, excommunicating Conradin and his followers, including Conrad of Antioch.

Conrad followed Conradin to Rome, where his entry on 24 July 1268 was greeted with festivities put on by the Ghibellines. When Conradin's army entered Sicilian territory a few days later, Conrad was leading a contingent of Tuscan militia. He was captured at the Battle of Tagliacozzo (23 August) along with Conradin. The latter was executed by Charles on 29 August, but Conrad, who was imprisoned in Palestrina, was spared through the intercession of Cardinal Giovanni Gaetano Orsini (the future Pope Nicholas III), whose two brothers, Napoleone and Matteo, were among the prisoners being held by Conrad's wife. Finally, in the middle of September, the two brothers were released and in exchange Conrad was transferred to papal custody.

== Imprisonment and Papal fealty ==
Clement IV died in November 1268, and during the lengthy Papal election that followed, Conrad was kept in confinement in Viterbo (where the cardinals were electing a new pope). Gregory X was finally elected in September 1271. In March 1272, soon after Gregory arrived at Viterbo, he freed Conrad and received in return an oath of fealty. He also lifted his excommunication a second time.

Following his release, Conradin went to Anticoli, his fief in the Papal State. His uncle Enzo, like Conrad's father an illegitimate son of Frederick II, had died in prison on 6 March 1272 and in his will, made shortly before his death, bequeathed to Conrad the county of Molise, which he had once held in the kingdom of Sicily. This bequest made sense from a dynastic perspective, since Conrad was, after the premature death of Conradin, the only person capable of rebuilding the family's power in Italy and Molise lay beside his lands in Abruzzo. For his part, Conrad partially made good on Enzo's testament by occupying the town of Macchia in Molise.

Nothing is known of Conrad's activities between 1272 and 1282. It is probable, however, that he was among those partisans of the Staufer, like John of Procida, who encouraged Peter III, king of Aragon, to conquer the kingdom of Sicily in the name of his wife, Constance, daughter of King Manfred.

== War of the Vespers ==
Following the Sicilian Vespers in March 1282, Peter of Aragon did invade Sicily. He landed on the island in August, and in October wrote to Conrad from Messina urging him to invade Abruzzo from his base at Anticoli. This was the start of a war that was to last until 1302.

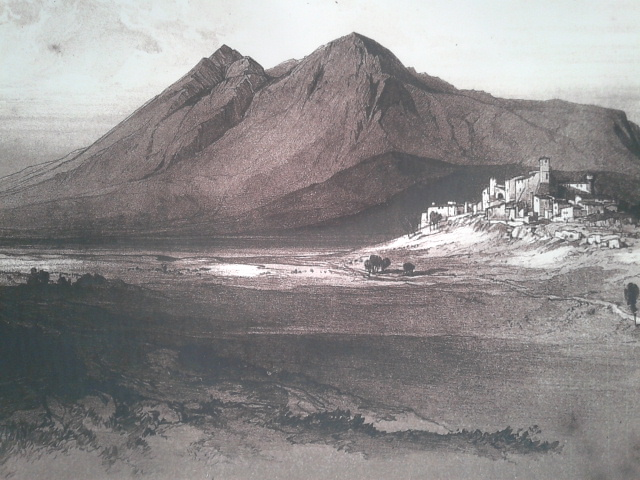
Castle and town of Alba as depicted prior to modernisation in the 19th century (detail of illustration by Edward Lear)

In response to Peter's call, Conrad tried to win over the fortresses along the Sicilian frontier through secretive negotiations. Pope Martin IV demanded he desist and, when he did not, pronounced him excommunicated for the third time on 23 November. He then invaded Abruzzo with a small force to carry out a guerrilla war. He often had the support of the common people, and captured the castles of Antrodoco, Frontino, Mareri and Petrella Liri. In June 1283, Charles of Anjou's son and heir, Charles, Prince of Salerno, who was acting as regent while Charles raised troops and ships in France, ordered several castles near the frontier dismantled to prevent their falling into Conrad's hands.

Following the Aragonese victory at the Battle of the Gulf of Naples (5 June 1284), where the Prince of Salerno was captured, Conrad led another invasion of Abruzzo, this time aiming to recapture his county and castle of Alba. In this first effort he was stopped near the castle of Celle by Stefano Colonna, lord of Genazzano in the Papal State, who was acting as the pope's man. He continued to plan the occupation of Abruzzo, even receiving money from Constance in Sicily. The death of Charles in January 1285 provided a second opportunity, and Conrad successfully occupied several castles of Abruzzo and even the county of Alba by 1286. He was unable to hold them for long. The pope sent an army under Giovanni d'Appia to dislodge him and Conrad retreated to Anticoli.

== Retirement and death ==
The third invasion of Abruzzo was the last major political act of Conrad's life. He lived out his days in Anticoli, where he was still living in 1301. According to the Historia Augusta of Albertino Mussato, a contemporary, on 7 May 1312 an aged Conrad went to Rome at the head of fifty knights to welcome the arrival of Henry VII of Germany for his imperial coronation. This was a major gathering of Ghibellines, who hoped that Henry VII would re-establish the empire in Italy.

It is probable that the death of Charles I opened the way to reconciliation with the Prince of Salerno, now Charles II, for Conrad managed to pass on to his descendants several fiefs in Abruzzo and Calabria. He also received from Peter of Aragon the county of Capizzi in Sicily. At some point after his death, his descendants split into two branches: one in Anticoli and Piglio and another in Capizzi. The Capizzi line died out in the fourteenth century, while that of Anticoli survived a century longer.
