= Vittorio De Marino =

Italian priest and physician

Venerable Vittorio De Marino CRSP
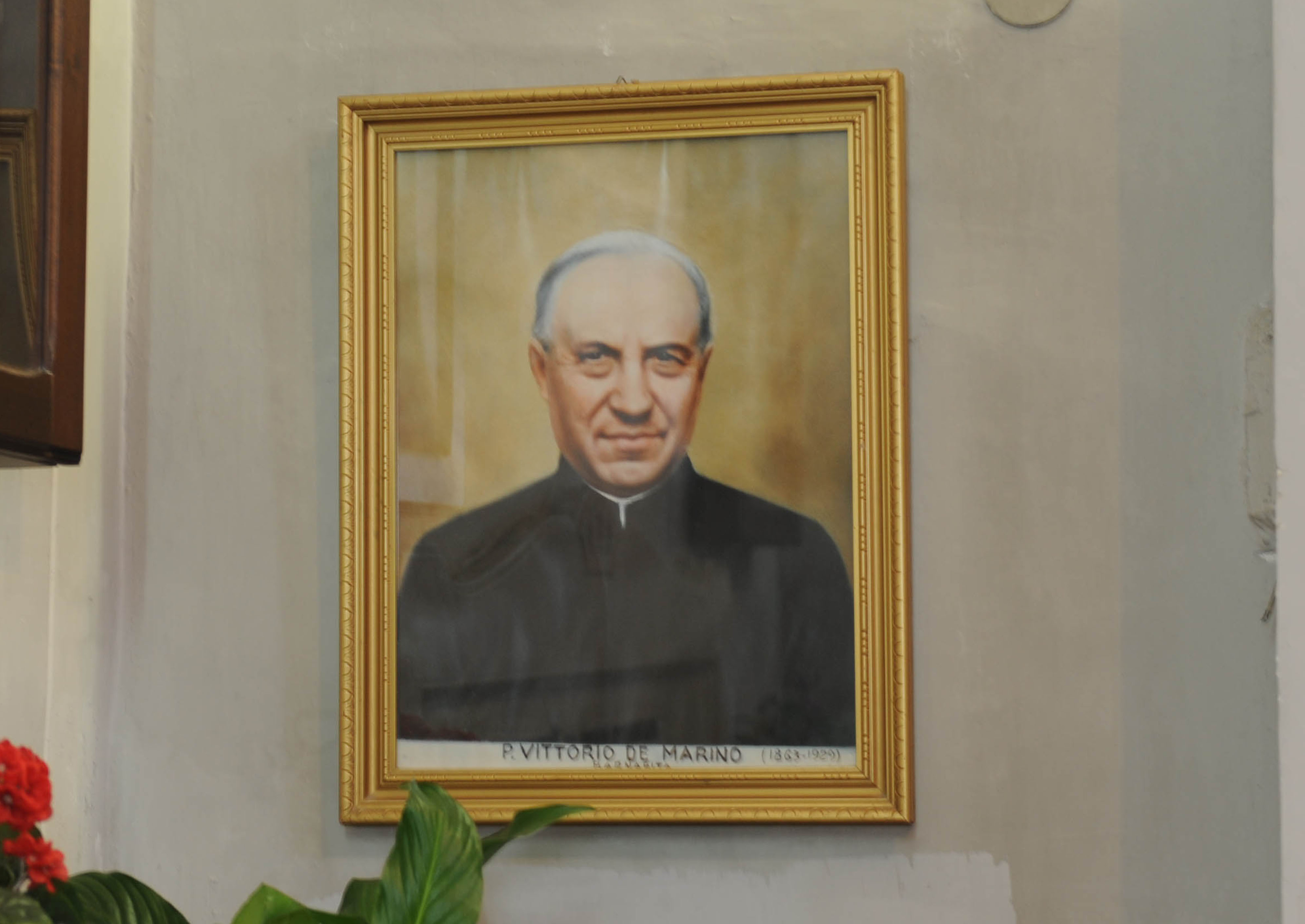
- Doctor of the Poor
- Church: Roman Catholic

Orders
- Ordination: 20 September 1910

Personal details
- Born: 7 June 1863 Villaricca, Naples, Kingdom of Italy
- Died: 16 July 1929 (aged 66) Naples, Kingdom of Italy
- Parents: Francesco & Concetta De Marino

Vittorio De Marino (7 June 1863 – 16 July 1929), full name Vittorio Pietro Paolo Giovanni Battista Pasquale De Martino, was an Italian physician known for his compassion for the poor of Naples and later a priest of the Barnabites. He was declared venerable by Pope John Paul II on 12 December 1992.

== Life ==
=== Birth ===
He was born in Villaricca, in the Province of Naples to Francesco De Martino, a chancellor of the trial court of Giugliano, and his wife, Concetta, the only son among their three children. His parents provided him with a strict and wise Christian education. He was baptized in the local parish on the same day of his birth.

=== Studies and medical career ===
After finishing his elementary school in 1878, De Marino attended the Bianchi College, operated by the Barnabites in Naples and in 1882 he chose to study medicine in compliance with his parents' will. He graduated from the University of Naples Federico II with honors, received a medical degree at the age of 24 and he became a well-known and admired doctor. He was known as the "Doctor of the poor" as he mainly took care of the poorest people and supported them with economic aids. In fact he usually left money in hidden places for the poor in order to give them the possibility to buy their medicines.

De Marino was also the main financial support of his parents, helping them in caring for one of his sisters who suffered from cancer for many years.

== Religious life ==
When his sister eventually died, De Marino, at the age of 47, decided to follow a religious vocation he had long felt, but which had been hindered by his parents. So, on 21 April 1910, he entered the novitiate of the Barnabite Fathers in San Felice a Cancello near Caserta, where he professed his vows the following years. As he demonstrated virtues as a doctor and as a benefactor of the people, he gained the admiration of his brothers and he was considered as an example for them. He was ordained a priest in the Archbasilica of St. John Lateran in Rome on 20 September 1913.

De Marino's first role of priestly ministry was at San Felice a Cancello in the church of St. John the Evangelist. In 1916 he was appointed Superior of the community and he kept on practicing as a doctor during World War I and during the worldwide pandemic of the Spanish flu that took many victims. In 1922 he was appointed rector of the new Apostolic School of the Barnabites in Arpino, and in 1924 he became the superior of the community of Santa Maria di Caravaggio in Piazza Dante (Naples).

== Death ==
De Marino was diagnosed with prostate cancer, which quickly got worse and led to his death on 16 July 1929 in Naples at the Bianchi College. His body was initially buried in the Cemetery of Poggioreale and then moved to San Giovanni Evangelista Church in San Felice a Cancello on 2 May 1954, twenty-five years later. In the same year the process for his beatification began.

== Bibliography ==
- D'Alessio, Romualdo M. (1953). Il servo di Dio p. Vittorio M. De Marino barnabita. Tipo-Lito La Precisa, S. Felice a Cancello.
- Mancino, Giovanni (2001). Padre Vittorio De Marino: Un Santo nel nostro tempo. Arte Tipografica Napoli.
