= Parete =

- Comune
- Comune di Parete
- Location within Italy Location within Campania
- Coordinates: 40°58′N 14°10′E
- Country: Italy
- Region: Campania
- Province: Province of Caserta (CE)

Area
  - Total: 5.7 km^{2} (2.2 sq mi)
- Elevation: 70 m (230 ft)

Population (Dec. 2004)
  - Total: 10,597
  - Density: 1,900/km^{2} (4,800/sq mi)
- Demonym: Paretani
- Time zone: UTC+1 (CET)
  - Summer (DST): UTC+2 (CEST)
- Postal code: 81030
- Dialing code: 081
- Patron saint: St. Peter
- Website: Official website

Parete is a comune (municipality) in the Province of Caserta in the Italian region Campania, located about 15 kilometres (9 mi) northwest of Naples and about 20 kilometres (12 mi) southwest of Caserta. As of 31 December 2004, it had a population of 10,597 and an area of 5.7 square kilometres (2.2 mi^{2}).

Parete borders the following municipalities: Giugliano in Campania, Lusciano, and Trentola-Ducenta.

The area of Parete is famous for the production of peaches, strawberries and Aversa Asprinio wine.

== History ==
The city was a settlement of the Oscan tribes.

Under the Romans, it was connected by the Via Campana, leading from Pozzuoli to Capua, and the Via Antica that led to Liternum. In the feudal age Parete was a duchy. It was in possession of several noble families of the Kingdom of Naples, Kingdom of Naples, including the Caracciolo, Cecaro, Sabatino-Falco and the Moles.

The Ducal Palace is the legacy of this period.

== Main sights ==
=== Ducal Palace ===
The Ducal Palace is a national monument that dates back to the feudal age.

The establishment freshly undertook renovations to accommodate Italy's first strawberry museum. The museum showcases five themed rooms that hubs the fruits botany, nutrition, history, economy and research.

The Ducal Palace has become a cultural centre, allowing the citizens to occasionally organize art displays, literary and musical events.

=== Church of St. Peter the Apostle Parish ===
The church is named after the patron saint of the town, Saint Peter, and it stands where there once was a place of worship that dated back to the very beginning of Christianity.

Since 1939 it has been a national monument.

From analysing its architecture, it is possible to establish that the church was founded in the first or second century. It was renovated and embellished in the sixteenth century, as the capitals, the frames, the dome and the façade attest. The paintings date back to the seventeenth century, with the exception of the Madonna della Rotonda, safely kept in an inner chapel.

=== Church of the Holy Trinity ===
The church was inaugurated on 22 November 1970 and it was designed by the architect Ugo Santoli. Its main feature is a mosaic depicting the Holy Trinity, produced by the Michele Mellini Company in Firenze.

Since 1984 the Church of the Holy Trinity has been legally recognized as a parish.

== Demographic evolution ==
Historical population

Year	Pop.	±%
1861	2,151	—
1871	2,104	−2.2%
1881	2,167	+3.0%
1901	2,575	+18.8%
1911	2,840	+10.3%

Year	Pop.	±%
1921	3,002	+5.7%
1931	3,560	+18.6%
1936	3,950	+11.0%
1951	4,826	+22.2%
1961	5,679	+17.7%

Year	Pop.	±%
1971	6,862	+20.8%
1981	8,024	+16.9%
1991	9,026	+12.5%
2001	10,325	+14.4%

Source: Data from ISTAT

== Feast of the patron saint ==
According to a local legend, in the sixteenth century on Easter Monday, a peasant found a painting with the image of Maria SS. della Rotonda ('Most Holy Mary of the Rotunda').

Every year on Easter Monday, the citizens organize a celebration in honour of the holy image. A very popular tradition, called the flight of the angel, occurs during this festival: a huge metal structure is put up in the square opposite the church and then attached to the church by a rope. This allows two young children to "fly" above the square from one end of the rope to the other, dressed as a little angels complete with little cardboard wings. There are also musical bands playing and stands selling sweets. The celebration ends with a fireworks display.

== Lost tradition ==
=== Feast of St. Peter the Apostle Parish ===
The origin of the cult of Saint Peter goes back to a local legend, according to which the Apostle, on his way to Rome, sojourned and preached in a little village now called Parete. The ancient name of the town is also linked to this legendary event: Sancti Petrus ad parietes, that is, 'the church of Saint Peter among the walls' (the houses).

The feast in his honour was held yearly on the third Sunday in October, at the end of the agricultural season. It was then moved to the first Sunday of the same month. The celebration revolved around two events: the Sunday mass and a music performance on the following day. However, this event has not taken place since the end of the 1990s.

== Infrastructure and transport ==
Parete is close to the exit of the Asse Mediano (ex SS 162 NC), Giugliano–Parete–Villaricca. It is also close to the exit Aversa sud-Lusciano-Parete of the SP 335 ex SS 265 dei Ponti della Valle (Giugliano–Marcianise).

The municipality is served by the CTP and CLP lines.
