= Ducenta =

Ducenta may refer to:

The comune of Trentola-Ducenta, Campania, southern Italy.

- Ducenta, a historical site of Tuscany.
