= Filippo Illuminato =

Italian partisan (1930–1943)

- Born: 21 August 1930; Naples
- Died: 28 September 1943 (aged 13); Naples
- Occupation: Apprentice vehicle mechanic
- Known for: Gold Medal of Military Valour

Filippo Illuminato (21 August 1930 – 28 September 1943) was an Italian partisan who died attacking Nazi German troops during the Four days of Naples in World War II. He was posthumously awarded the Gold Medal of Military Valour, Italy's highest award for gallantry.

On 3 September 1943, the Allies and the Kingdom of Italy signed the Armistice of Cassibile. On 8 September, it became publicly known, and Nazi Germany reacted by attacking Italy, their former Axis ally. On 13 September, the Nazi military governor of Naples ordered disarmament, and a curfew, and threatened savage retaliation for any attack on his men. On 26 September, the city rose in insurrection (the Four days of Naples). When the Allies entered Naples on 1 October, the Nazis had gone.

Illuminato came from a poor Neapolitan family. After finishing elementary school, he took a job as an apprentice mechanic in a vehicle repair shop. His Gold Medal citation reads:

Combattente tredicenne nella insurrezione di Napoli contro l'invasione tedesca, solo e con sublime ardimento, mentre gli uomini fatti cercavano riparo, muoveva incontro ad un'autoblinda che dalla piazza Trieste e Trento stava per imboccare via Roma. Lanciata una prima bomba a mano, continuava ad avanzare sotto il fuoco nemico e lanciava ancora un'altra bomba prima di cadere crivellato di colpi. Suprema, nobile temerarietà che solleva il ragazzo tredicenne fra gli eroi della Patria e che viene additata con fierezza al ricordo di Napoli e dell’Italia tutta. — Napoli, Piazza Trieste e Trento, 28 settembre 1943.

An English translation:

A thirteen-year-old fighter in the insurrection of Naples against the German invasion, alone and with sublime boldness, while the men sought shelter, he attacked an armoured car that was about to enter Via Roma from Piazza Trieste and Trento. After throwing one hand grenade, he advanced under enemy fire and threw a second grenade before falling riddled with bullets. Such supreme, noble recklessness elevates this thirteen-year-old boy to a place among the heroes of the Nation, and he is to be acknowledged with pride in the memory of Naples and of all Italy. - Naples, Piazza Trieste e Trento, 28 September 1943.

His name is commemorated in a street in Naples, Via Filippo Illuminato, and in a high school in Mugnano di Napoli, Scuola Filippo Illuminato.
