= Charles of Bourbon Hunting Coots on Lake Licola =

Painting by Claude Joseph Vernet

Charles III hunting on Lake Licola
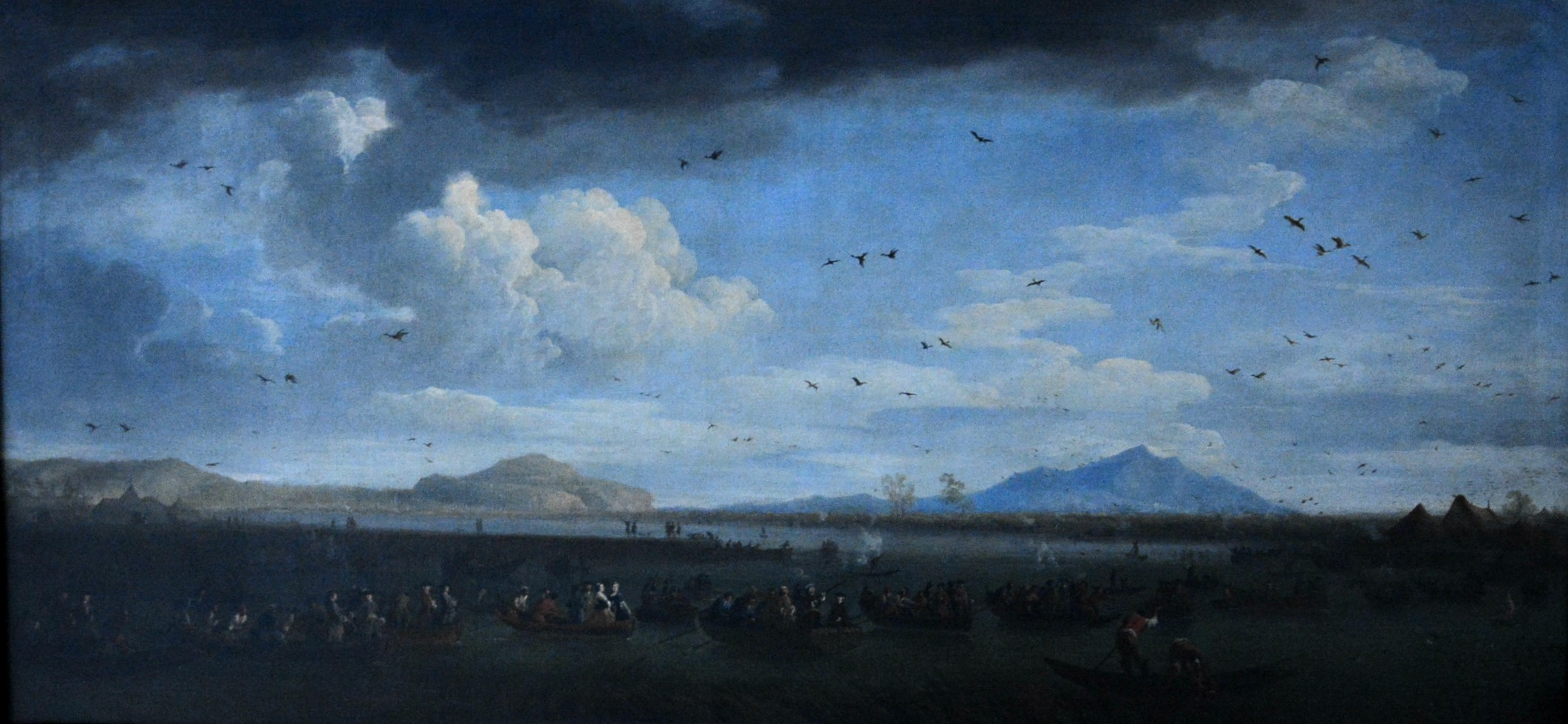
- Artist: Claude-Joseph Vernet
- Year: 1746
- Medium: oil paint, canvas
- Dimensions: 75 cm (30 in) × 155 cm (61 in)
- Location: Museo di Capodimonte

Charles of Bourbon Hunting Coots on Lake Licola is an oil painting on canvas by the French artist Claude Joseph Vernet, commissioned by Charles III of Spain during Vernet's second stay in Naples in 1746. A slightly larger copy now in the Palace of Versailles was commissioned by the Marquis de L'Hôpital, French ambassador to Naples. The prime version was moved from the palace at Caserta in 1938 to the Capodimonte Palace in Naples and now hangs in the National Museum of Capodimonte.

== Description ==
The work portrays the king with his court engaged in a hunting expedition on boats, probably organized on the occasion of the visit of an important guest: this scene is depicted in the foreground, with Charles III taken up at the exact moment in which he strikes with the shot of a rifle a coot. As attested by Vernet himself, the place must be the lake of Patria, however the views in the background of the promontory of Cuma and the island of Ischia suggest that it is a swamp, specially created by flooding during the winter to satisfy the hunting passion of the king, between Lake Licola and Varcaturo. The sky is characteristic, with the passage of a black cloud, which obscures the scene, almost in contrast with the red and white spots given by the clothes of the participants in the event.
