= Lusciano =

- Comune
- Comune di Lusciano
- Location within Italy Location within Campania
- Coordinates: 40°58′N 14°11′E
- Country: Italy
- Region: Campania
- Province: Caserta (CE)

Area
  - Total: 4 km^{2} (1.5 sq mi)
- Highest elevation: 50 m (160 ft)
- Lowest elevation: 0 m (0 ft)

Population (31 December 2011)
  - Total: 14,749
  - Density: 3,700/km^{2} (9,500/sq mi)
- Demonym: Luscianesi
- Time zone: UTC+1 (CET)
  - Summer (DST): UTC+2 (CEST)
- Postal code: 81030
- Dialing code: 081
- Patron saint: St. Lucian Martyr
- Saint day: 7 January

Lusciano is a comune in the province of Caserta in Campania, Italy. Between 1929 and 1946, it was part of the comune of Aversa.

== Neighbouring communes ==
- Aversa
- Trentola-Ducenta
- Parete
- Giugliano in Campania
