= Lago di Licola =

Former artificial coastal lake in Pozzuoli, Italy

- Location: Pozzuoli, Italy
- Coordinates: 40°51′31.55″N 14°2′59.68″E
- Type: artificial lake (drained)

Location
- Interactive map of Lago di Licola

The Lago di Licola (English: Licola Lake) was an artificial lake located on the coast in the municipality of Pozzuoli, near the locality of Licola.

== History and description ==
During the Neronian era, the emperor himself decided to construct a navigable canal, called Fossa Neronis, intended to connect the port of Pozzuoli with Rome, spanning a length of one hundred sixty miles. The project was designed by architects Severus and Celer, and construction began in an area slightly north of Cumae, already predominantly marshy, where numerous coots, locally called follicole in dialect, resided, giving the area its name, Licola. With Nero's death, construction was halted, and the project was definitively abandoned. The ditch created, fed by waters from nearby hills, gave rise to a marsh. This was transformed into a lake following reclamation works during the Middle Ages.

The Lago di Licola thus developed the typical flora and fauna of a marsh, also nourished by its proximity to the sea, which contributed to its popularity during the 18th century and early 19th century. The Bourbons, particularly Charles III of Spain, turned it into a site for their hunting and fishing expeditions, with the construction of small houses, chapels, and dovecotes, as well as for the soaking of flax and hemp. During the extensive reclamation project that affected the area at the end of the 19th century, the lake was completely drained, and remnants of necropolises and roads with sidewalks from the Roman era were also demolished.

The Lago di Licola had an elongated shape, still visible due to the lush vegetation that grew where its waters once stood. The surrounding area remained marshy, as depicted in a 1746 painting by Claude Joseph Vernet, Charles of Bourbon Hunting Coots on Lake Licola, showing King Charles hunting on the lake's shores.

== Bibliography ==
- Palatino, Lorenzo (1826). Storia di Pozzuoli: e contorni con breve tratto istorico di Ercolano, Pompei, Stabia, e Pesto [History of Pozzuoli: and Surroundings with a Brief Historical Account of Herculaneum, Pompeii, Stabia, and Paestum] (in Italian). Naples: Nobile Editore.
- Rescigno, Carlo (2013). Cuma: Il tempio di Giove e la terrazza superiore dell'acropoli [Cumae: The Temple of Jupiter and the Upper Terrace of the Acropolis] (in Italian). Venosa: Osanna Edizioni. ISBN 978-88-816-7352-0.
- Touring Club Italiano (2012). Museo di Capodimonte [Capodimonte Museum] (in Italian). Milan: Touring Club Editore. ISBN 978-88-365-2577-5.
