= Breve chronicon Lauretanum =

The Breve chronicon Lauretanum ("Short Chronicle of Loreto") is a brief anonymous medieval Latin chronicle from the Kingdom of Sicily. It contains short notices on events of the years 1187, 1188, 1190, 1195 and 1220, but is most useful for the continuous narrative it provides for the period 1249–1271. It focuses mainly on events in and connected with the county of Loreto Aprutino. The entire chronicle is short enough to have been first published in a single footnote, but it provides information not found elsewhere about the counts of Loreto and the prince of the Abruzzi, Conrad of Antioch.

It is known from two manuscripts: one from the fifteenth century in the Biblioteca Nazionale di Napoli, segn. IX, C.24, fol. 52^{v}–53^{r}, and another, with slight variations, from the seventeenth century and once in the private possession of Gennaro Aspreno Galante. In the Napoli manuscript it bears the title Chronicon Lauretanum MCLXXXVII–MCCLXXI, on which the modern editors' title is based. In the seventeenth-century manuscript, it is called, rather grandiosely, the Chronica regni Siciliae ("Chronicle of the Kingdom of Sicily").

== Excerpts ==
Anno MCCXXXXIX captus est comes Bernardus Laureti comes de mandato Domini Imperatoris, et falsa occasione sumpta ab eodem Frederico morte crudelissima, ut dicitur, condempnatus est.

In the year 1249, Count Berard [II], the count of Loreto, was arrested by order of the Lord Emperor [Frederick] and, a false charge taken up, Frederick condemned him, it is said, to a most cruel death.

Anno domini MCCLXVII mense Ianuarii predicti domini Conradus et Iohannes de Malerio, fracto carcere, evaserunt latenter extra Regnum fugientes et eodem anno Conradinus applicuit cum exercitu suo apud Veronam, denique anno sequenti.

In the year of our Lord 1267, in the month of January, the aforesaid lords Conrad and John of Mareri, breaking out of prison, went into hiding, fleeing out of the kingdom, and that same year Conradin pitched his army in Verona, and in the following year.
