= Loreto Aprutino =

- Comune
- Comune di Loreto Aprutino
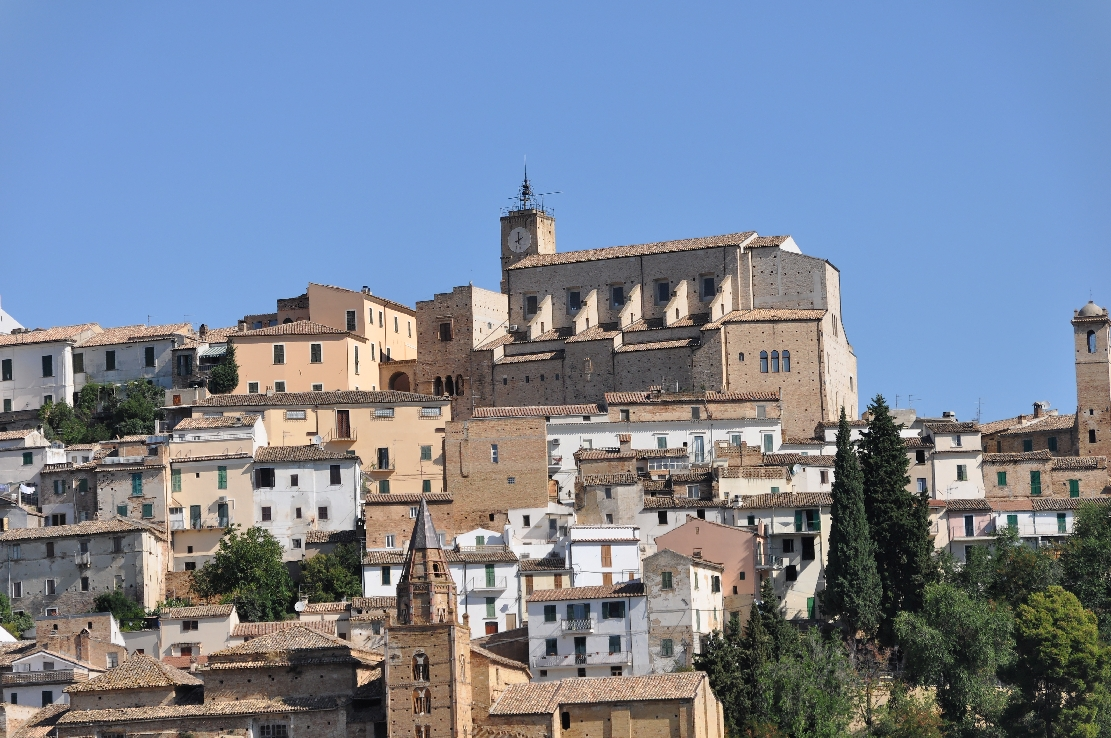
- View of Loreto Aprutino

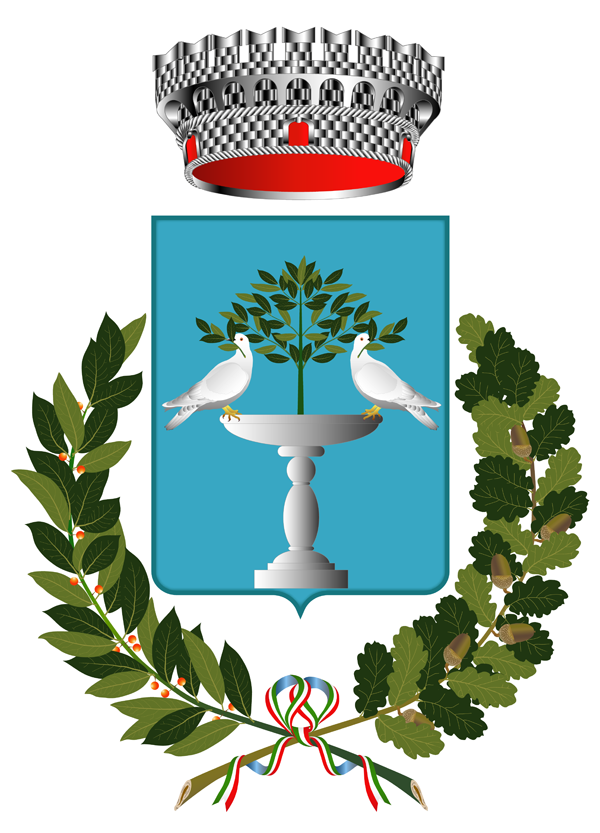
- Coat of arms

- Location within Italy Location within Abruzzo
- Coordinates: 42°26′N 13°59′E
- Country: Italy
- Region: Abruzzo
- Province: Pescara (PE)
- Frazioni: Acquamorta, Belvedere, Bufarale, Burlesco, Camposacro, Cancelli, Cardito, Cartiera, Casafora, Castelluccio, Cecalupo, Collatuccio, Collecera, Collefreddo, Collepalma, Colle Carpini, Colle Cavaliere, Colle Ospedale, Cordano, Cupello, Farina, Ferrauto, Fiorano, Fiume, Fontemaggio, Fonte Murata, Fornace, Galliano, Gallo, Gomma, Lauriana, Madonna degli Angeli, Moscone, Muretto, Palazzo, Pallante, Pantano, Passo Cordone, Paterno, Piano della morte, Poggio Ragone, Pozzelle, Pretore, Pretosa, Remartello, Rielli, Rotacesta, Sablanico, Saletto, Salmacina, San Domenico, San Giovanni, San Pellegrino, San Quirico, Santa Maria in Piano, Scannella inferiore, Scannella Superiore, Scrizzetto, Sgariglia, Silvi, Valle Passeri, Valle Stella, Vicenne, Villa Erminia

Area
  - Total: 59 km^{2} (23 sq mi)
- Elevation: 307 m (1,007 ft)

Population (1 January 2013)
  - Total: 7,549
  - Density: 130/km^{2} (330/sq mi)
- Demonym(s): Loretesi, Lauretani, Rotesi
- Time zone: UTC+1 (CET)
  - Summer (DST): UTC+2 (CEST)
- Postal code: 65014
- Dialing code: 085
- Patron saint: San Zopito
- Saint day: Monday after Pentecost
- Website: Official website

Loreto Aprutino (Abruzzese: Lûrëtë) is a comune and town in the Province of Pescara in the Abruzzo region of central Italy.

== History ==
The presence of necropoleis at Colle-Fiorano and at Farina-Cardito suggest that a significant pre-Roman settlement once existed near the modern town. The Italic Vestini, following their defeat by the Romans in the Social War, eventually built a town around the castellum and called it Lauretum, because of the many bay laurels (Latin laurus) that then grew in the area.

The town was built around a castle and abbey, established by Benedictine monks around the year 1000, and came to political prominence in the eleventh century with the establishment of a county by the Normans. The town would be a stronghold of Swabian and Angevin nobility until the fourteenth century, when a series of great houses would rule Loreto and the surrounding countryside up to the abolition of feudalism: among others, the d'Aquino, the d'Avalos, the Caracciolo, as well as Margaret Habsburg, and Alessandro de' Medici. A local chronicle, the Breve chronicon Lauretanum, covers the middle decades of the 13th century.

In 1863, after the unification of Italy, the adjective "Aprutino" was added to the name of the town to distinguish it from several other towns of the same name: in Ancona province, in Asti province, in Novara province, and two separate towns in Perugia province. During this period, the town would experience a renaissance of culture and civic life after a long period of stagnation. Arts and crafts were supported by wealthy benefactors such as Giacomo Acerbo, who would create the Museum of Ceramics . It is during this period that Castello Chiola , which dominates the skyline of the town, is constructed.

== Economy ==
The production of olive oil and wine are mainstays of the local economy. The more important estates include Valentini, Talamonti, and Torre dei Beati.

== Sights ==
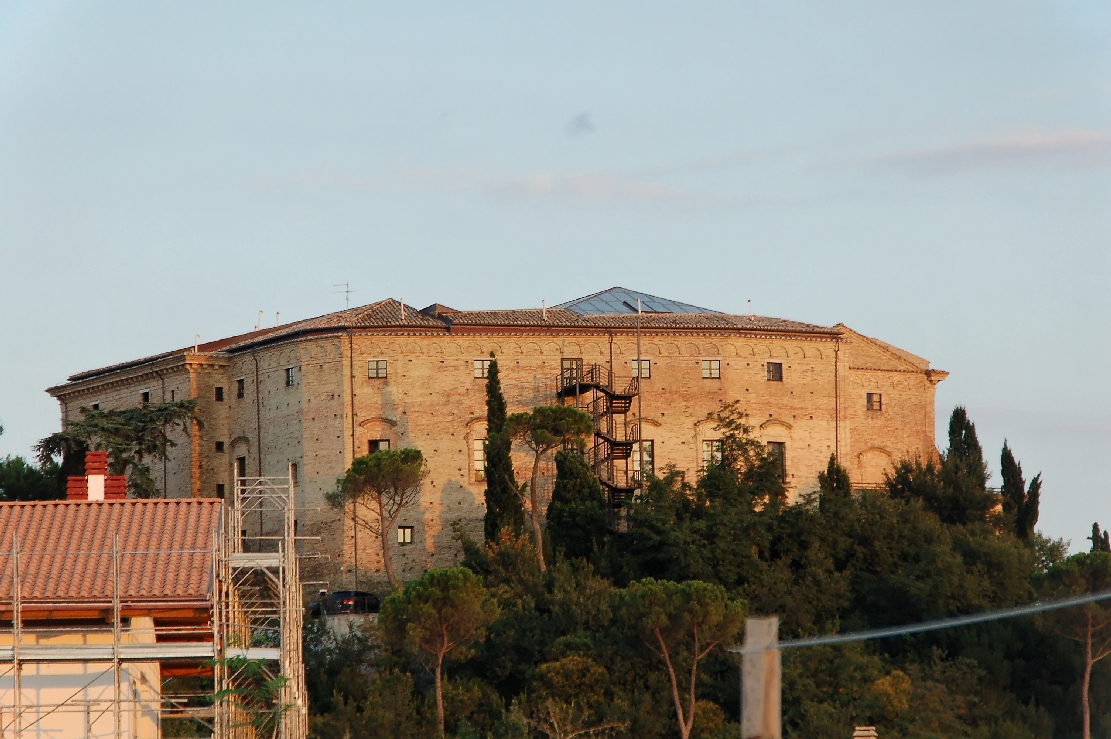
Loreto Aprutino 2011 by-RaBoe 04

Castello Chiola was built on the site of a medieval castle which, according to the earliest records dating back to the ninth century, was itself constructed in the time of [Charles the Bald], and its construction proceeded haphazardly from that time, as it was also used as a prison and military fort. Another significant landmark is the church of San Pietro Apostolo (St. Peter the Apostle). Built in the eleventh century, the church has a central nave and two aisles decorated with scrolls and baroque decorations, and side chapels with frescoes and tiled floors, the most important dedicated to St. Thomas Aquinas and St. Zopito the Martyr, the patron saint of the town.

Just outside the town is the church of S. Maria in Piano, which dates from 1280. The portal is decorated with a series of inscriptions in praise of the Virgin Mary, and all the walls and ceilings are eight frescoes dating from the fourteenth to the sixteenth century, depicting stories of saints, including St. Thomas Aquinas, whose family commissioned the frescoes. The more famous painting, however, is the Giudizio particolare delle anime ("Unusual punishment of souls"), made with the technique of Encaustic painting, by which colors are dissolved into melted wax and heated at the time of painting. The work represents the time of Divine judgment as a difficult passage across a bridge as thin as a human hair ("The bridge of hair"), that only holy souls can overcome without falling into the river of boiling pitch, and who are then adorned with fine clothes and ascend to the heavens.

== Festivals ==
Each spring on the first Monday after Pentecost, the city celebrates the Festa di San Zopito and a parade is held. A child, dressed all in white and wearing a crown of flowers, rides a white ox that is decorated with colored ribbons on its horns and a red mantle bearing an image of San Zopito.

== See also ==
- Abruzzo (wine)
