= Lago Patria =

- Frazione
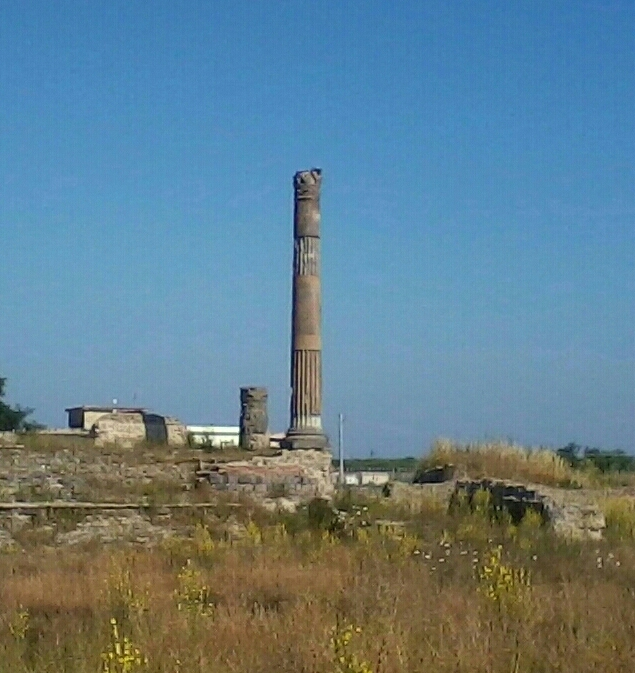
- Column of the Temple of Liternum

- Location of Lago Patria in Italy
- Coordinates: 40°55′33″N 14°2′9″E
- Country: Italy
- Region: Campania
- Province: Naples (NA)
- Comune: Giugliano in Campania
- Elevation: 10 m (33 ft)

Population (2001)
  - Total: 3,562
- Time zone: UTC+1 (CET)
  - Summer (DST): UTC+2 (CEST)
- Postal code: 80014
- Dialing code: (+39) 081
- Patron saint: St. Iulianus, Madonna della Pace
- Saint day: 27 January

Lago Patria is a village and a hamlet (frazione) of Giugliano in Campania which takes its name from Lake Patria. Since 2012, the area has been home to the Allied Joint Force Command Naples, which was relocated from the Naples quarter of Bagnoli. The base hosts approximately 2,500 military personnel and civilian staff from around 30 NATO member countries.

== History ==
Inhabited by the Osci during the 5th and 4th century BC, the area experienced significant development under the Romans, who founded the city of Liternum here in 194 BC by settling 300 families of colonists.

The most distinguished citizen of the small colony was Scipio Africanus, who, following a dispute with the Roman Senate and especially with Cato the Elder (Carthago delenda est), chose to retire there for the rest of his life. The reason for this decision lay in the accusations of corruption and embezzlement brought against the Scipio family by the most uncompromising faction of the Roman Senate, which strongly disapproved of the moderate peace concluded after the victory at Zama.

Ancient accounts and historical sources, including Seneca, place the villa and tomb of the renowned general within the territory of Liternum, although neither has yet been identified. Ancient sources also report the alleged epitaph engraved on Scipio's tomb ("Ungrateful fatherland, you shall never possess my bones"). It has been suggested that the name of the locality derives from this phrase.

During the 2nd century BC, Liternum reached a certain degree of prosperity and became part of the commercial network of the flourishing Phlegraean Fields, particularly Cumae and Baiae. In the 1st century BC, the Roman writer Valerius Maximus described it as an ignobilis place, but archaeological evidence contradicts what was almost certainly an exaggerated judgement by the historian of the Augustan period, which was more likely a literary hyperbole. Cicero described the territory of Liternum as one of the most fertile agricultural areas. Like all Roman municipia, Liternum possessed a forum with a Capitolium (of which only the podium and a single in situ column survive), a basilica, and a Roman theatre, which has been partially excavated in recent years. There was also an amphitheatre, where gladiatorial games were held. In AD 455, the Vandals under Genseric sacked the city. After the 4th century, following floods and several barbarian invasions, the surviving population moved to the present-day historic centre of Giugliano. During the 16th century, a system of masserie developed throughout the Giugliano countryside. Several large rural settlements were established for the cultivation of farmland, serving as centres of social life.

During the 1930s, under Fascist rule, the wetland underwent land reclamation to recover it for agricultural use. Between the 1990s and the early 2000s, however, the expansion of the modern Lago Patria district led to widespread illegal construction, whose buildings destroyed most, if not all, of the ancient urban fabric. The Archaeological Superintendency of Naples attempted to curb the phenomenon and restore the archaeological heritage to public use, but achieved only limited results.

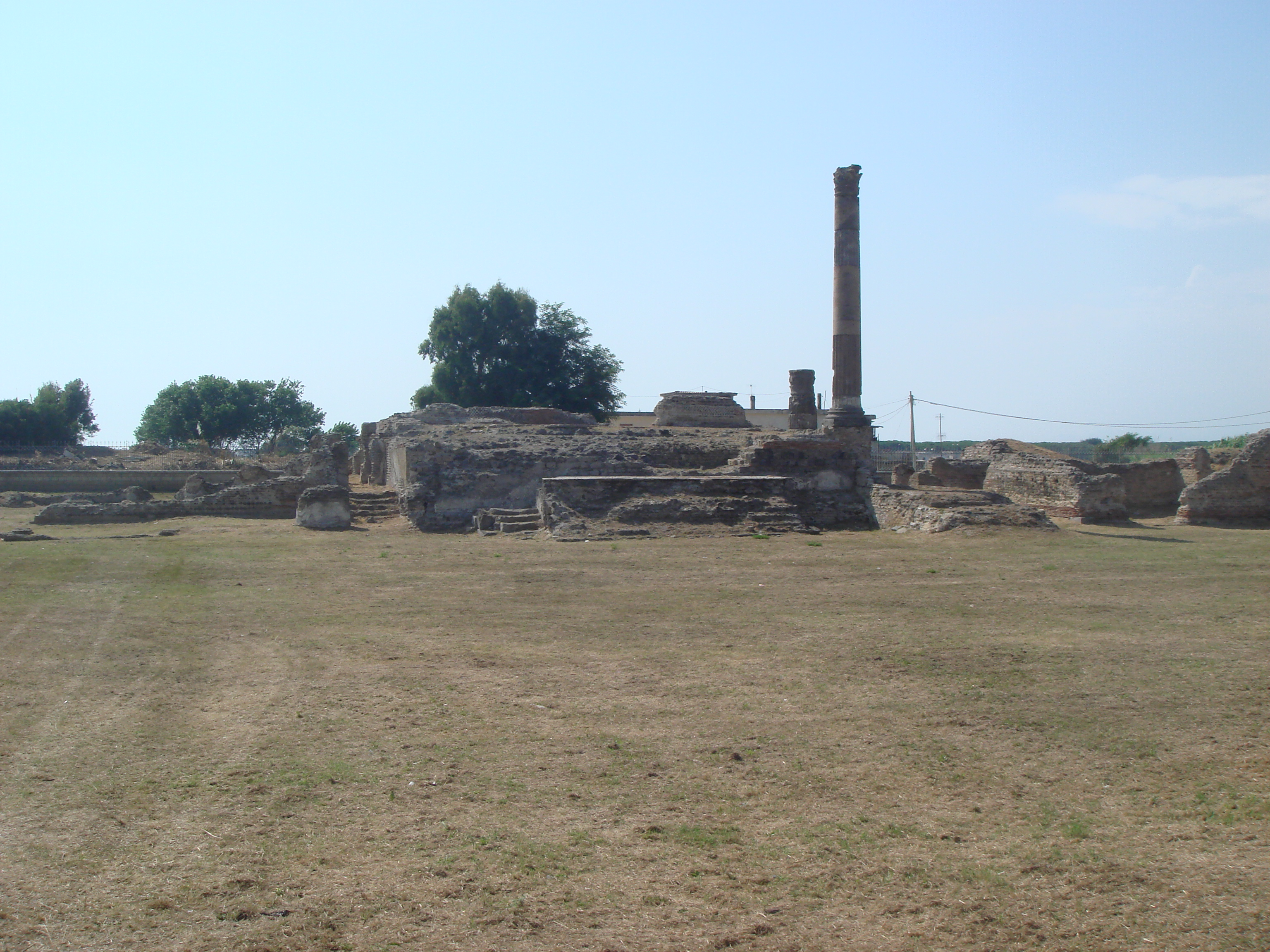
The temple of the forum. On the left are the remains of the basilica, while on the right are the remains of the theatre

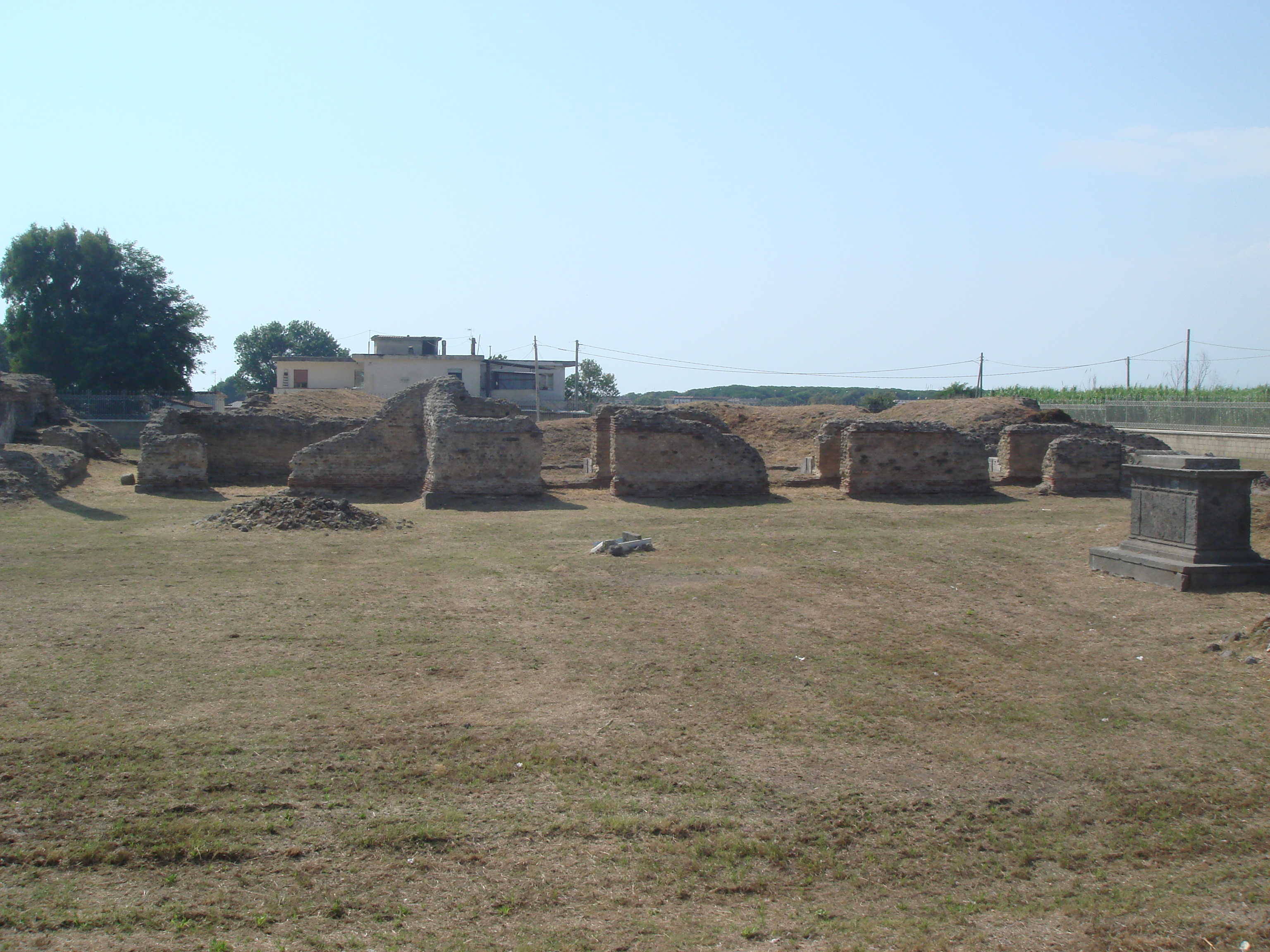
The remains of the theatre, viewed from the skene

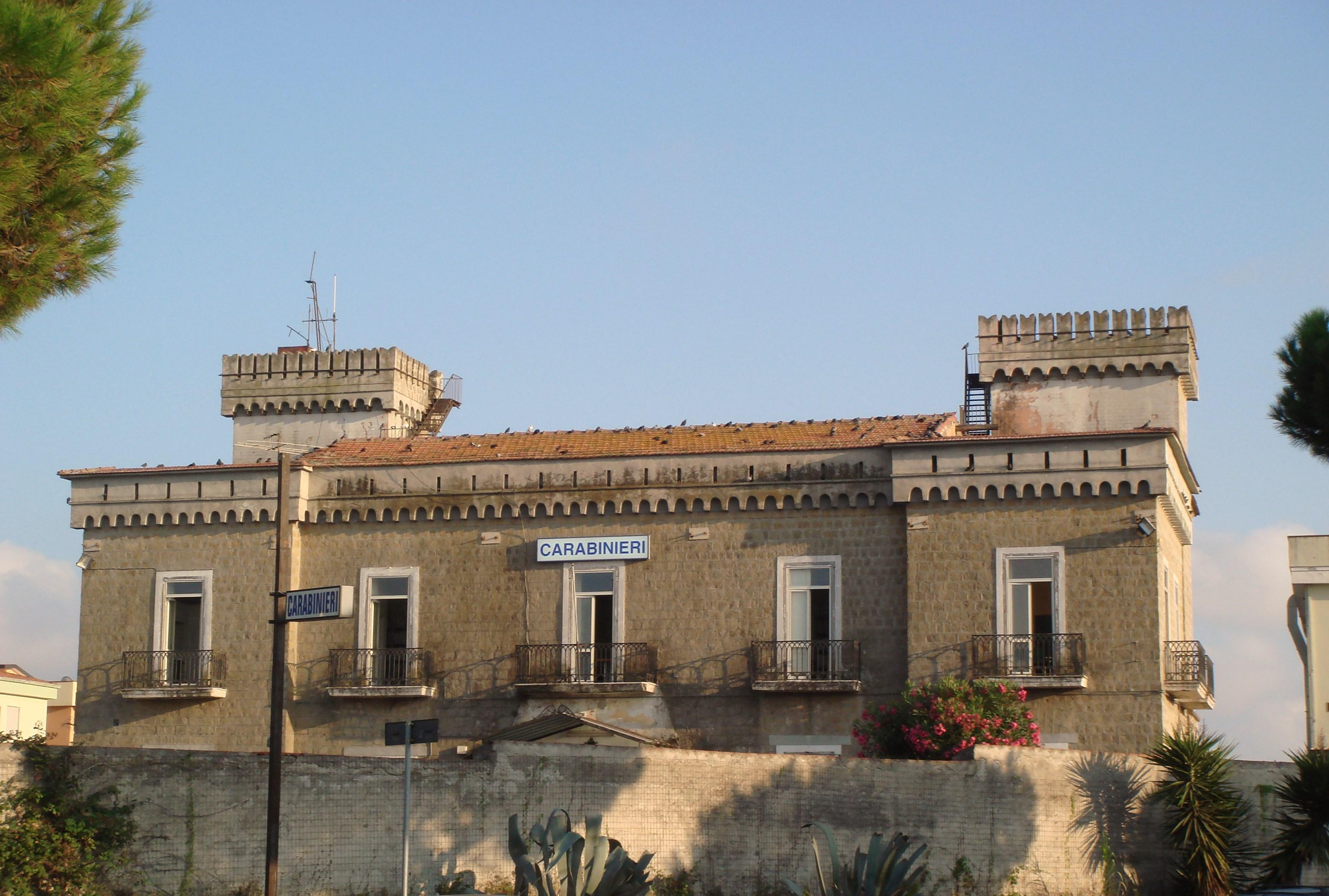
Villa De Blasio, former Carabinieri station

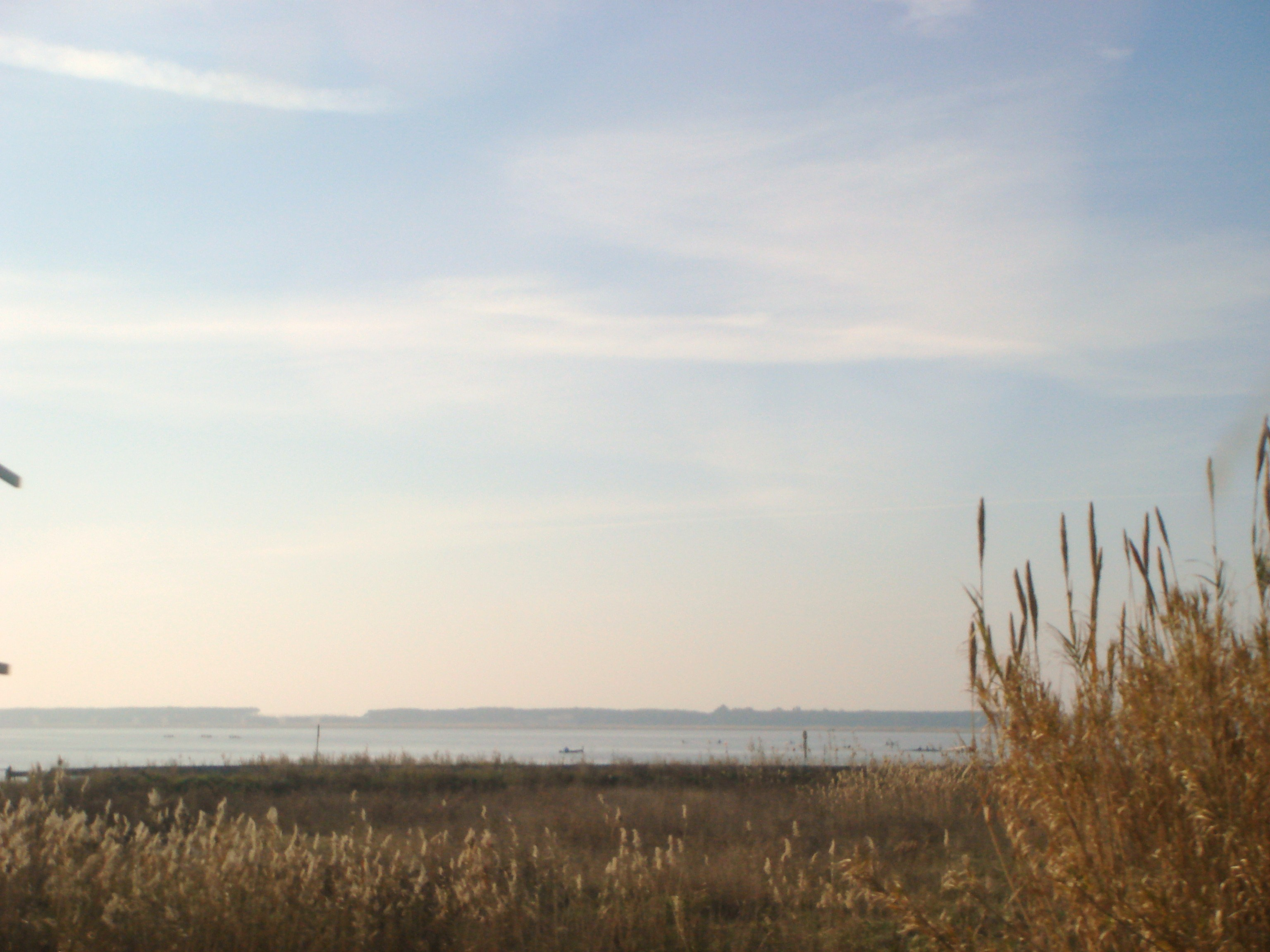
View of Lake Patria

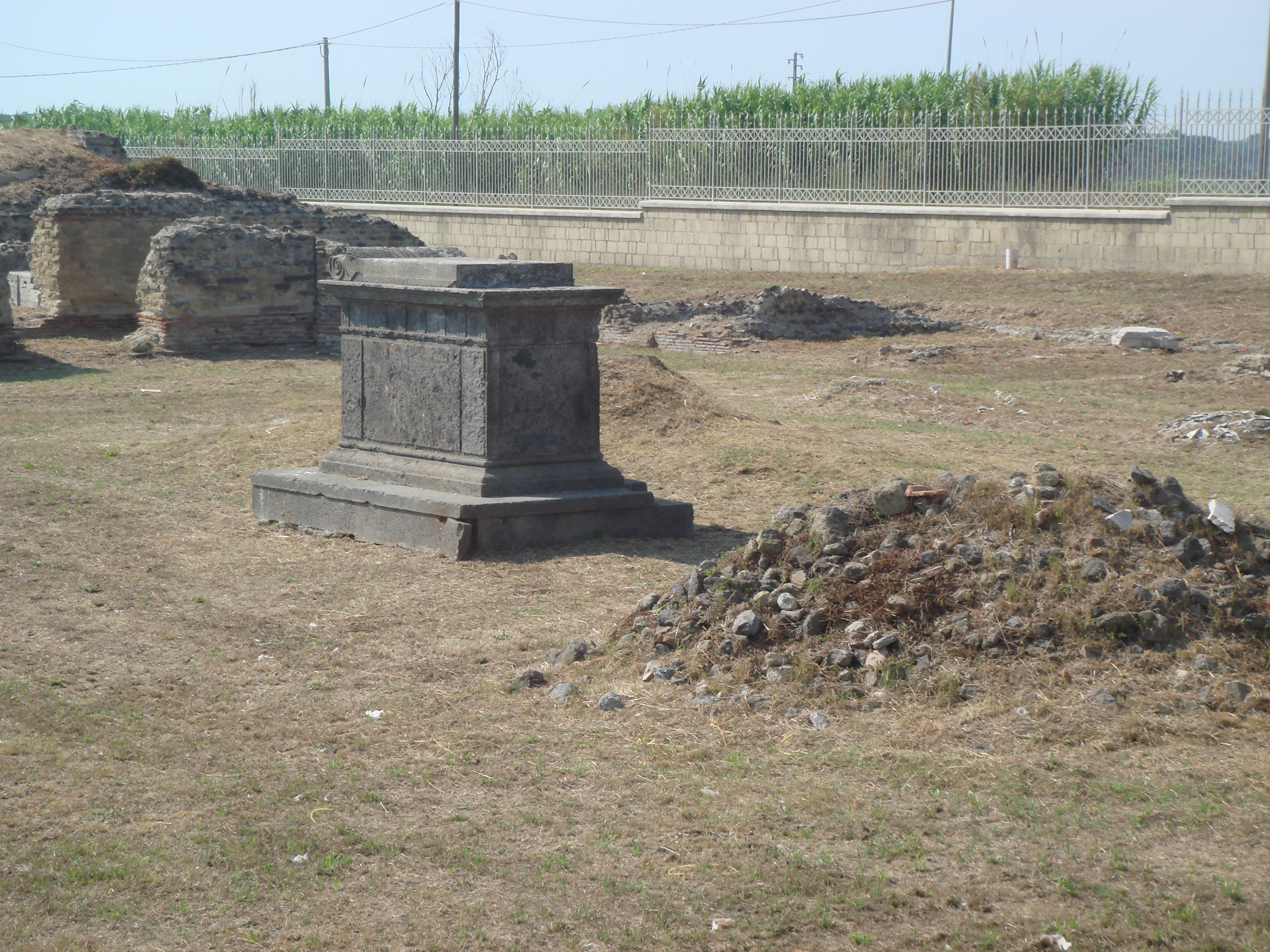
Votive altar dedicated to Scipio Africanus, erected in 1936
