= Carlo Curci =

Italian painter

Carlo Curci (30 August 1846 – after 1916) was an Italian painter, mainly of seascapes. He also was active in painting portraits in a Renaissance style.

== Biography ==
Curci was born in Trentola-Ducenta. He exhibited at the Promotrice Salvator Rosa in Naples between 1873 and 1876. In 1873 he exhibited his Effects of the Fog on the Sarno, Un ricordo di Trani, and Sorgere di luna; in 1874 La calma, Il Cervaro and In the Valley of Bovino; in 1875 and 1876 he exhibited Effects of Snow and Studio dal vero (Molfetta). In 1877, at the National Exposition of Naples, he exhibited Vandals over the Apennines and at the 1881 Venetian exhibition, he displayed Marina calma. In 1883, he sent four works to the Roman Exposition, two of which, In Apulia and October, were exhibited again at Turin the following year. He also painted Quiet Sea and Fog on the Adriatic.

In 1891, Curci moved to Trani. In 1892, at the Italo-American Columbian Exposition of Genoa, he exhibited two seascapes and one landscape. At the Turin Columbian Exposition of Modern Art in 1893, he exhibited Alba, Interno, Sole, and Study. He continued to exhibit at Trani and completed decorations with landscapes (1894 and 1905) to the walls of the Palazzo Discanno (1894). He died in Trani after 1916.
