= Nicola Mignogna =

Italian politician (1808–1870)

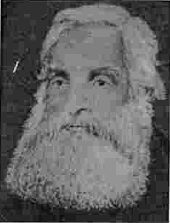

Nicola Mignogna (1808–1870) was an Italian politician who played a significant role in the Risorgimento.

== Biography ==
He was born in Taranto, Apulia, Southern Italy, but later moved to Naples (which at the time was a move within the Kingdom of the Two Sicilies) to attend jurisprudence studies. His life takes place during the conspiracy plots which characterised the south of Italy from 1848 to 1870.

Little is known about Benedetto Musolino e Luigi Settembrini's “Figlioli della Giovane Italia” (Little sons of the young Italy) sect, however Mignogna's collaboration with Settembrini is documented in the “Unità d'Italia” (Italy's Unity) sect in the years 1848-49 with his task being the typographical reproduction of the revolutionary flyers and its spreading in the provinces. Mignogna was arrested with Settembrini on June 23, 1849, but was released a few months later; while Settembrini, recognised as the leader, was condemned to capital punishment, sentence later reduced to life imprisonment.

Arrested in 1851, Mignogna was released months later as his crimes were considered unproven. Coordinator of the revolutionary Neapolitan committee, Mignogna conspired between May 1854 and the beginning of 1855 with Casimiro De Lieto, in exile in Genoa, to overthrow Ferdinand II of the Two Sicilies, plan which seemed to initially have, thanks to the political movement originated with Lucien Murat, a small chance of being successful. He was arrested again on July 26, 1855, but he didn't reveal the conspiracy plot nor the collaborators' names, even under torture. Other defendants confessed and, also through the deciphering of certain letters, it became clear that Mignogna was at the core of the revolutionary machine in the Neapolitan's region. After a trial known in England as "Mignogna's case", which emotionally shook the European democratic environment (especially in France), he was condemned to exile.

In Genoa, in the years 1856-1857, Carlo Pisacane made use of Mignogna's Neapolitan logistics knowledge to study with Giuseppe Mazzini a new insurrectional plan which, according to the conspirators' intentions, should have involved Naples and the regions of Cilento, Calabria and Basilicata, which were the centers where the feelings against the near-dictatorial power of Ferdinand II were felt the most. Pisacane refused the help of Lucien Murat's collaborators and his expedition (which did not see Mignogna's direct involvement) ended unsuccessfully, for various reasons and unfortunate coincidences. During the preparation of Pisacane's expedition, the assistance from the employees of Naples's embassy was valuable, as they were responsible for the mail delivery between Genoa and Naples, redirecting it first to Malta, where it was marked as diplomatic mail, therefore hiding the true conspiratory contents of the letters. It is worth to note that English Ambassador William Temple, brother of Prime minister Lord Palmerston, helped by his secretary George Fagan, despite never being directly involved, greatly supported the Neapolitan's patriots.

In 1859, Mignogna often travelled between Genoa e Florence, remaining in contact with Mazzini, to support the insurgence which arose in the Tuscany and Romagna regions in that year. This movement was however suddenly stopped by the king of Sardinia Victor Emmanuel's warning to Giuseppe Garibaldi.

In February 1860, representing the Genoa's revolutionaries, Mignogna went to Caprera to relief Garibaldi (disappointed by his failed marriage with Giuseppina Raimondi) and encourage him to resume his fight for Italy's unification. Mignogna's support towards Garibaldi led to a first few steps towards an expedition to Sicily, which later became the Expedition of the Thousand. As part of the Expedition of the Thousand to Marsala, he followed Garibaldi to Palermo, covering the charge of the Thousand's treasurer. He was later sent to Genoa by Garibaldi to plan an insurgence in the region of Lazio. Ultimately, he travelled to Naples to promote the revolution in the region of Basilicata; together with a few thousands of patriots he easily conquered the city of Potenza where a dictatorial government was proclaimed and established with Mignogna and Giacinto Albini as their leaders in support of Garibaldi.

In 1862 Mignogna was with Garibaldi in Aspromonte.

He died in 1870 in Giugliano in Campania, near Naples.
