= Calvizzano =

- Comune
- Comune di Calvizzano
- Coat of arms

- Location within Italy Location within Campania
- Coordinates: 40°54′N 14°11′E
- Country: Italy
- Region: Campania
- Metropolitan city: Naples (NA)
- Frazioni: San Pietro

Area
  - Total: 3.9 km^{2} (1.5 sq mi)
- Elevation: 135 m (443 ft)

Population (31 January 2015)
  - Total: 12,504
  - Density: 3,200/km^{2} (8,300/sq mi)
- Demonym: Calvizzanesi
- Time zone: UTC+1 (CET)
  - Summer (DST): UTC+2 (CEST)
- Postal code: 80012
- Dialing code: 081

Calvizzano is a comune (municipality) in the Metropolitan City of Naples in the Italian region Campania, located about 9 km (5.6 mi) northwest of Naples.

Calvizzano borders the following municipalities: Marano di Napoli, Mugnano di Napoli, Qualiano, Villaricca.

== Physical geography ==
Calvizzano is located in the fertile plain south of the Regi Lagni, in the heart of the Campania plain, in a highly urbanized area. The municipality is located in the agglomeration northwest of Naples (the Giuglianese countryside) together with the municipalities of Marano, Mugnano, Villaricca, Qualiano and Giugliano in Campania.

== Origins of the name ==
According to the local historian Raffaele Galiero the name derives from Calvisius (or Calvicius), a landowner belonging to the gens Calvisia. From here the name which would have transformed into Calvisiano, Calbictian and finally Calvizzano.

In the seventeenth century the notary Marco Antonio Syrleto, the first local historian, had formulated another etymological hypothesis for the toponym: according to him this would have derived from the fact that in ancient times, following the many wars and plagues, in this place many tombs containing only skulls were found, which were called calvi; when healthy people came to this territory to live there, from the union of the Calvi to the sani, the name Calvisano would have been born, later translated by the common people into Carvizzano and then into Calvizzano.
