= Trentola Ducenta =

- Comune
- Comune di Trentola Ducenta
- Coat of arms

- Location within Italy Location within Campania
- Coordinates: 40°59′N 14°11′E
- Country: Italy
- Region: Campania
- Province: Caserta (CE)
- Frazioni: Ischitella

Government
  - Mayor: Andrea Sagliocco

Area
  - Total: 6.6 km^{2} (2.5 sq mi)
- Elevation: 42 m (138 ft)

Population (1 January 2017)
  - Total: 19,628
  - Density: 3,000/km^{2} (7,700/sq mi)
- Demonym(s): Trentolesi, Ducentesi
- Time zone: UTC+1 (CET)
  - Summer (DST): UTC+2 (CEST)
- Postal code: 81038
- Dialing code: 081
- Website: Official website

Trentola Ducenta is a comune (municipality) in the Province of Caserta in the Italian region Campania, located about 20 kilometres (12 mi) northwest of Naples and about 15 kilometres (9 mi) southwest of Caserta.

Trentola Ducenta borders the following municipalities: Aversa, Casapesenna, Giugliano in Campania, Lusciano, Parete, San Marcellino.

== Notable people ==
- Carlo Curci (1846-after 1916), painter
- Elio Verde (born 1987), judoka
