= Giugliano in Campania =

- Comune
- Comune di Giugliano in Campania
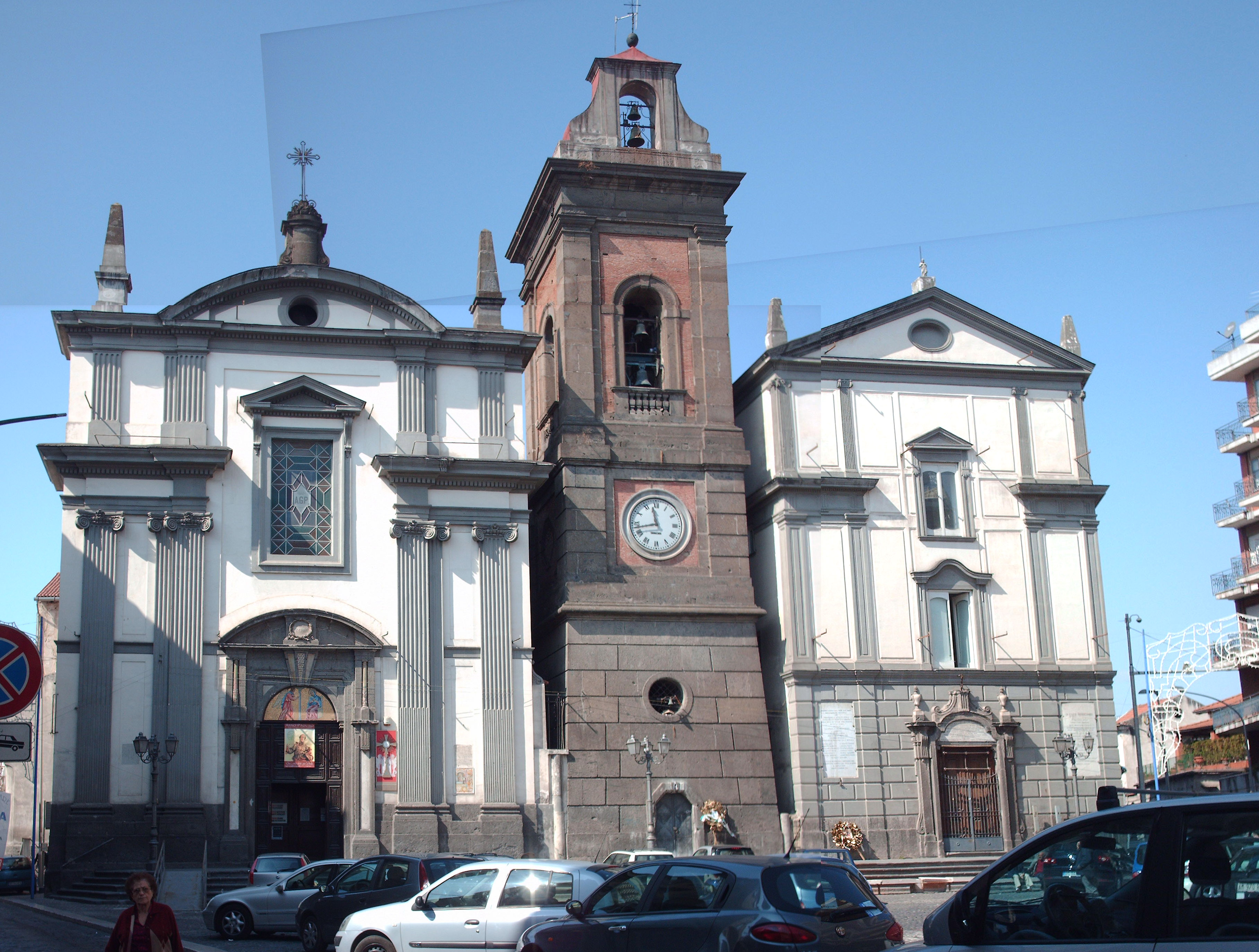
- Church of the Annunziata

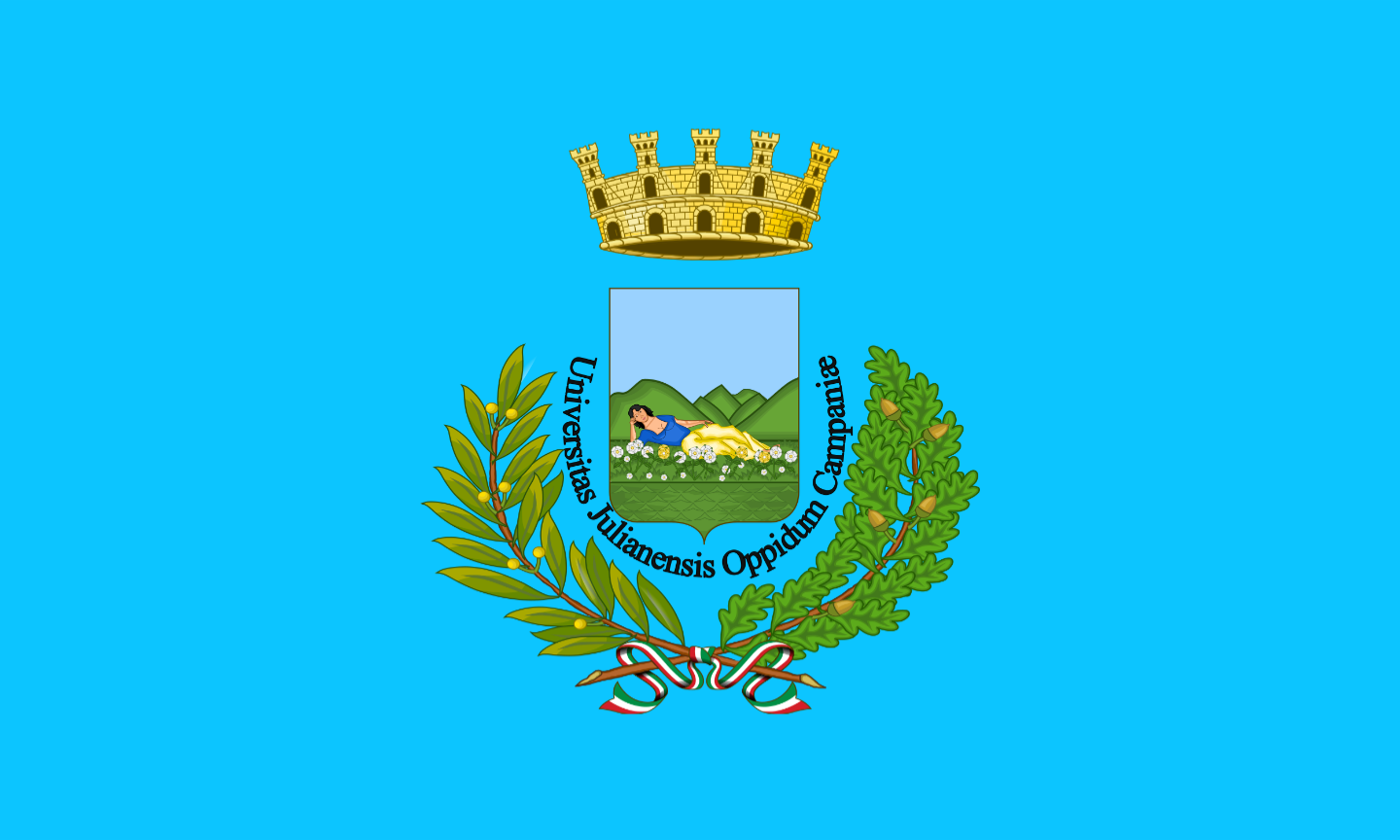
- Flag Coat of arms

- Location within Italy Location within Campania
- Coordinates: 40°56′N 14°12′E
- Country: Italy
- Region: Campania
- Metropolitan city: Naples (NA)
- Frazioni: Lago Patria, Varcaturo, Licola

Government
  - Mayor: Diego Nicola D'Alterio

Area
  - Total: 94.62 km^{2} (36.53 sq mi)

Population (2026)
  - Total: 125,018
  - Density: 1,321/km^{2} (3,422/sq mi)
- Demonym: Giuglianesi
- Time zone: UTC+1 (CET)
  - Summer (DST): UTC+2 (CEST)
- Postal code: 80014
- Dialing code: 081
- Patron saint: St. Iulianus
- Saint day: January 27
- Website: Official website

Giugliano in Campania (Italian: [dʒuʎˈʎaːno iŋ kamˈpaːnja]), known simply as Giugliano, is a city and comune (municipality) in the Metropolitan City of Naples in the region of Campania in southern Italy. It has 125,018 inhabitants, making it the most populated Italian city that is not a provincial capital, and the 2nd most populated city in the region.

== History ==
In 5th-4th century BCE the territory of Giugliano was settled by the Osci, who founded, among the many cities, Atella and Liternum, both of them flourished under the dominion of Rome. The area is that known as Terra di Lavoro, which was the most fertile part of Campania felix.

Near "Lake Patria", there was the ancient city of Liternum. In 194 BC it became a Roman colony. The town is mainly famous as the residence of the elder Scipio Africanus, who withdrew from Rome and died there. His tomb and villa are described by Seneca the Younger. In 455, the town was pillaged and destroyed by Genseric and his Vandals. The surviving population migrated to the present historical center of Giugliano.

The city remained a small center until 1207, when Cuma was destroyed by the Neapolitans; some of the citizens from that town, including the clergy and the cathedral capitular, took shelter in Giugliano. The first documents mentioning a fief in Giugliano dates from 1270.

In 1495 Charles VIII of France, having occupied the Kingdom of Naples, gave the feud to Count Michele Riccio, from whom it was taken away with the defeat of the French.

Carbone family in 1536 and then Carafa family in 1542 sold their shares to Cosimo Pinelli, whose family administered Giugliano correctly for about a century. Cosimo, with his influence, obtained the concession of the jurisdiction which administratively freed the fief of Giugliano from Aversa's interference. In 1545 he had the ducal palace built there, at the time the center of power. In this period there was a notable boost to the economy and to the cultural and social growth of the Giugliano university, leaving various artistic testimonies. In 1639 Galeazzo Pinelli sold the shares due to Cesare D'Aquino. The period of the lordship of the D'Aquinos created chaos and discontent among the population, who asked the viceroy for help for the abuses suffered. In 1647, Henry II, Duke of Guise descended into Italy with his army, with claims to the crown of Naples, and set up his camp in Giugliano with about 5,000 soldiers.

During the seventeenth century the Mancini family was invested, probably for a short time, with the barony of Giugliano with Domenico Nicola II, former Marquis of Fusignano and Vice Grand Chancellor of the Kingdom of Naples. In 1691 the feud passed to Francesco Grillo who acquired the title of "Duke of Giugliano". With the death of Duke Domenico Grillo, without children, it was devolved to the Royal Court.

The Viceroy and Prince of Stigliano, Marcantonio Colonna, bought it in 1778 and held it until the French Revolution. With the French decade of Joseph Bonaparte, the subversive laws of feudalism were enacted decreeing the end of all feudal privileges in the Kingdom of Naples and the beginning of the municipal administration. Therefore the last to govern the Giuglianese feud was the Colonna dynasty, after which power passed into the hands of the citizens. Lords of the city were, in sequence, the Vulcano, Filomarino, Pignatelli, D'Aquino, Pinelli and Colonna.

After the unification of Italy, in 1863, the specific "In Campania" was added to the name "Giugliano" to distinguish it from the homonyms then existing.

Since 2012, the Lago Patria district of Giugliano in Campania has hosted Allied Joint Force Command Naples, a NATO military command that relocated from the Naples district of Bagnoli..

== Geography ==
It is located in a fertile coastal plain north-west of Naples, the so-called Agro giuglianese, thus serving as a market for agricultural products to the city. The plain on which it sits was known in ancient Roman times as the Campania Felix, the only relief being Monte San Severino.

The altitude difference is between a few meters above sea level in the maritime area and 97 m above sea level in the historic centre. The coastal stretch, low and sandy, extends on the Domitian coast for over 3 km, from Varcaturo to Licola. Within the territory is Lago Patria, with the locality of the same name on its banks. The lake is not of volcanic origin, but residual behind the dunes, i.e. generated by the closure of sand dunes towards the sea.

Giugliano in Campania borders the municipalities of Aversa, Casapesenna, Castel Volturno, Lusciano, Melito di Napoli, Mugnano di Napoli, Parete, Pozzuoli, Qualiano, Quarto, San Cipriano d'Aversa, Sant'Antimo, Trentola Ducenta, Villa Literno and Villaricca.

== Demographics ==
Historical population
Year	Pop.	±%
1861	10,749	—
1871	11,306	+5.2%
1881	11,636	+2.9%
1901	13,561	+16.5%
1911	14,761	+8.8%
1921	16,340	+10.7%
1931	20,638	+26.3%
1936	21,474	+4.1%
1951	26,310	+22.5%
1961	30,429	+15.7%
1971	35,757	+17.5%
1981	44,220	+23.7%
1991	60,096	+35.9%
2001	97,999	+63.1%
2011	108,793	+11.0%
2021	123,758	+13.8%
Source: ISTAT

As of 2026, the population is 125,018, of which 49.4% are male, and 50.6% are female. Minors make up 19.2% of the population, and seniors make up 15.9%.

=== Immigration ===
As of 2025, immigrants make up 5.4% of the population. The 5 largest foreign countries of birth are Ukraine, Ghana, Romania, Nigeria, and Poland.

== Sights ==
- Palazzo Pinelli or Palumbo, built in 1545 by architect Giovanni Francesco di Palma. It had a side tower, which was later demolished.
- Church of Santa Sofia (17th century), designed by Domenico Fontana. It was finished in 1730-1745 by the Neapolitan architect Domenico Antonio Vaccaro. It houses the tomb of Giovan Battista Basile.
- Church of the Annunziata, known from the 16th century. It is home to several canvasses by Neapolitan artists such as Massimo Stanzione and Carlo Sellitto. it has a nave with apse and transept; the pulpit is in Roccoco style, while the rest of the interior is decorated in Baroque style. Notable are also the large wooden organ (late 16th century), the Chapel of Madonna della Pace and early 16th Stories of the Virgin in the left transept.
- Church of Sant'Anna. Of the original building, existing in the 14th century, the bell tower remains. It houses 16th-century paintings by Fabrizio Santafede and Pietro Negroni.
- Church of Madonna delle Grazie, with a 14th-century bell tower and a 16th-century portal. The interior has a 15th-century Gothic Incoronation of the Virgin and early 16th-century frescoes.
- Church of Santa Maria della Purità or of the Souls of Purgatory (18th century). It was designed by Domenico Antonio Vaccaro, who also designed the internal stuccos and the covering of the dome, made as fish scales. The structure is an octagonal plant and has four altars, besides the greater one.
- Ancient town of Liternum. The excavations brought to light, between 1930 and 1936, some elements of the city center (forum with a temple, a basilica and a small theater) dating from the beginning of the Roman Empire. Outside the city walls, the remains of the amphitheater and the necropolis have been identified.
- Lake Patria, in the frazione of the same name, it was called by ancient Roman "Literna Palus". It is part of the Natural Reserve "Foce Volurno - Costa di Licola".

== Cuisine ==
On the occasion of the patronal feast, January 27, it is customary to cook meatballs with sauce called palle di san Giuliano (Italian for balls of San Giuliano).

== Media ==
The city is home to the studios of the television broadcaster Tele Club Italia, active in documenting news, sports and politics in the northern area of Naples.

The city of Giugliano is mentioned several times in the episodes of the Gomorrah TV series, when the Savastano Clan decides to intervene in the municipal elections.

== Transport ==
Giugliano is served by the Line 11 of the Naples Metro. A railway station, Giugliano-Qualiano, is located some kilometers outside the city. It is part of the Passante Ferroviario di Napoli, a branch of the Rome–Formia–Naples railway.

== Education ==
The municipal library is located in via Giuseppe Verdi.

There are several high schools active in Guigliano, including the scientific and linguistic high school; Commercial and hotel institute; Industrial Technical Institute; classical high school; and the Institute for Industry and Crafts. Since 1931, the Marist Brothers religious institute has been present in the city, operating primary and secondary schools.

== Archaeology ==
In 2023, archaeologists uncovered a well-preserved, unsealed 2000-year-old tomb with frescoes in Giugliano in Campania. It dates back to the Roman Republican and Imperial eras. One notable fresco portrays Cerberus earning the tomb the designation "Tomb of Cerberus". The scene corresponds to the final of Heracles' twelve labors, during which he successfully captures Cerberus.

== Notable people ==
- Scipio Africanus (236-245–183 BC), Roman general
- Adriana Basile (1586–1642), composer and singer
- Giovan Battista Basile (1566–1632), poet, courtier and fairy tale collector
- Raffaele Cantone (born 1963), magistrate
- Nicola Mignogna (1808–1870), politician and a significant contributor of Risorgimento

== See also ==
- Giugliano Calcio 1928
- Liternum
- Licola
