= Qualiano =

- Comune
- Comune di Qualiano
- Location within Italy Location within Campania
- Coordinates: 40°55′N 14°9′E
- Country: Italy
- Region: Campania
- Metropolitan city: Naples (NA)
- Frazioni: Glicine-Teorema, Oleandro, Ripuaria, Varcaturo

Government
  - Mayor: Raffaele De Leonardis

Area
  - Total: 7.43 km^{2} (2.87 sq mi)
- Elevation: 101 m (331 ft)

Population (1 January 2017)
  - Total: 25,766
  - Density: 3,470/km^{2} (8,980/sq mi)
- Demonym: Qualianesi
- Time zone: UTC+1 (CET)
  - Summer (DST): UTC+2 (CEST)
- Postal code: 80019
- Dialing code: 081
- Website: Official website

Qualiano is a comune (municipality) in the Metropolitan City of Naples in the Italian region Campania, located about 13 kilometres (8.1 mi) northwest of Naples.

Qualiano borders the following municipalities: Calvizzano, Giugliano in Campania, Villaricca.

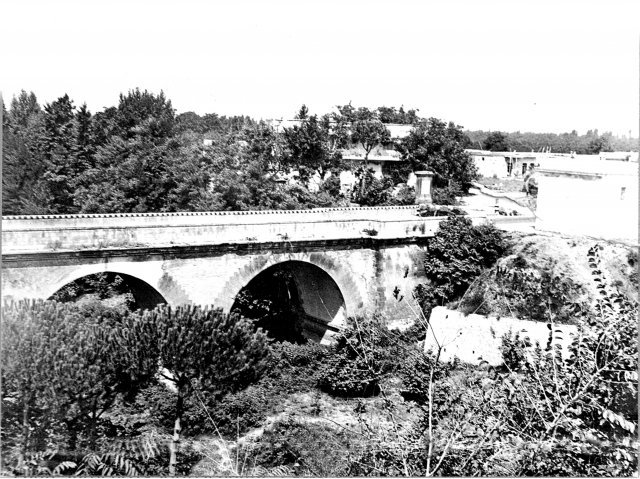
