= Mugnano di Napoli =

- Comune
- Comune di Mugnano di Napoli
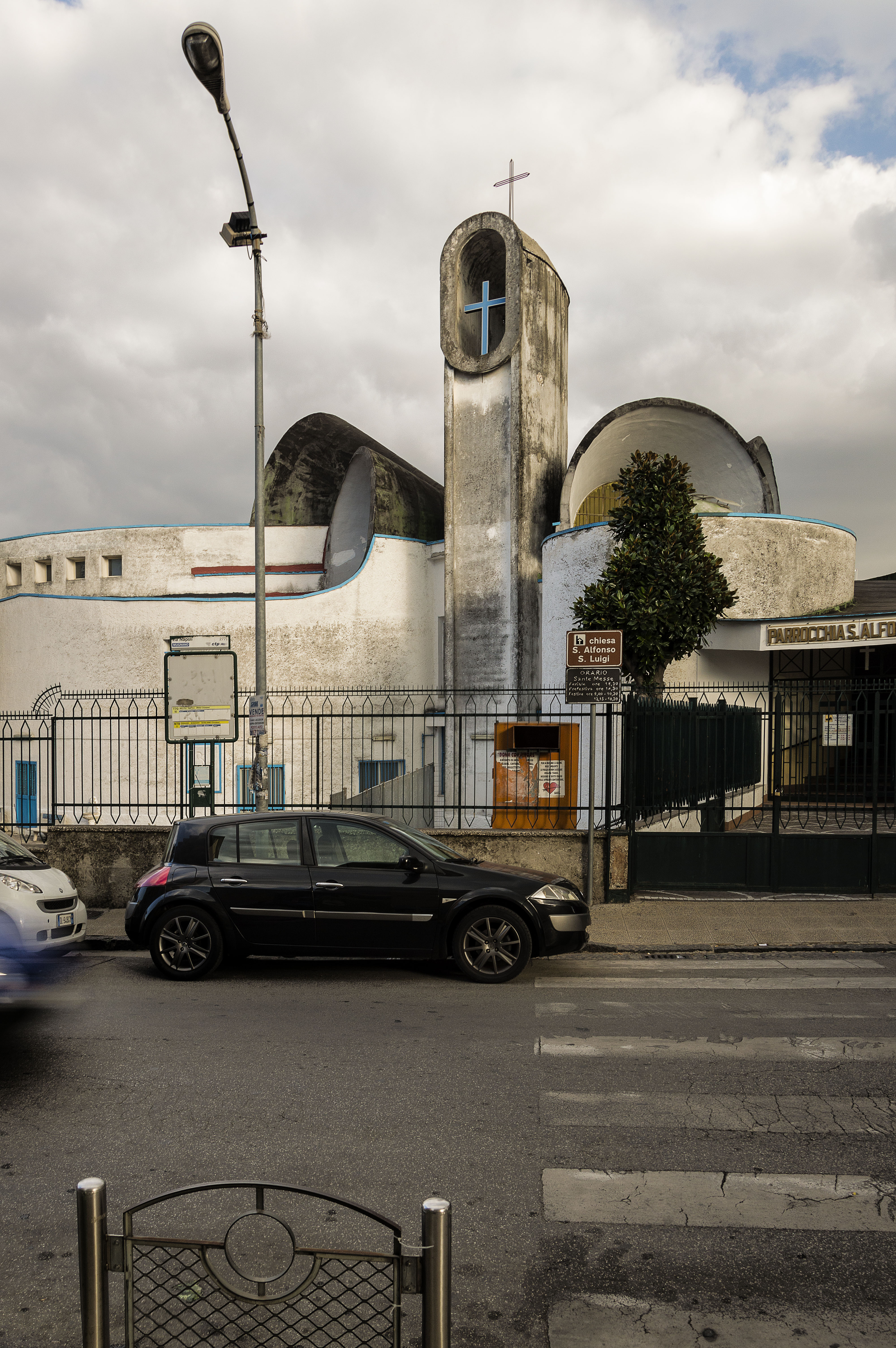
- Church of San Alfonso and San Luigi

- Location within Italy Location within Campania
- Coordinates: 40°55′N 14°12′E
- Country: Italy
- Region: Campania
- Metropolitan city: Naples (NA)

Government
  - Mayor: Luigi Sarnataro

Area
  - Total: 5.27 km^{2} (2.03 sq mi)
- Elevation: 125 m (410 ft)

Population (30 November 2015)
  - Total: 34,857
  - Density: 6,610/km^{2} (17,100/sq mi)
- Demonym: Mugnanesi
- Time zone: UTC+1 (CET)
  - Summer (DST): UTC+2 (CEST)
- Postal code: 80018
- Dialing code: 081
- Website: Official website

Mugnano di Napoli is a comune (municipality) in the Metropolitan City of Naples in the Italian region of Campania, about 10 km (6.2 mi) northwest of Naples.

Mugnano di Napoli borders the municipalities of Calvizzano, Giugliano in Campania, Marano di Napoli, Melito di Napoli, Naples and Villaricca.

Scuola Filippo Illuminato is a local school named for Filippo Illuminato (1930-1943), a partisan who won the Gold Medal of Military Valour.
