= D'Aquino =

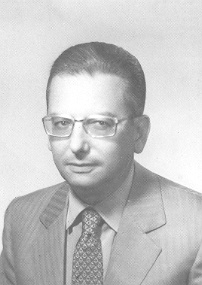

D'Aquino is an Italian surname and a variant of Aquino. It may refer to:

- Iva Toguri D'Aquino (1916–2006), American who participated in Radio Tokyo English-language propaganda broadcasts during World War II
- John D'Aquino (born 1958), Canadian-American actor, played Lt. Benjamin Krieg in the NBC TV series seaQuest DSV
- Matt D'Aquino (born 1985), Australian Judoka who has represented Judo at the 2008 Beijing Olympic Games and four World Championships
- Raffaele D'Aquino (born 1903), Italian professional football player

== See also ==
- D'Aquino family, Italian noble family
- San Mango d'Aquino, town and comune in the province of Catanzaro, in the Calabria region of southern Italy
