= Liternum =

Ancient Roman town

Coordinates: 40.921094°N 14.030128°E

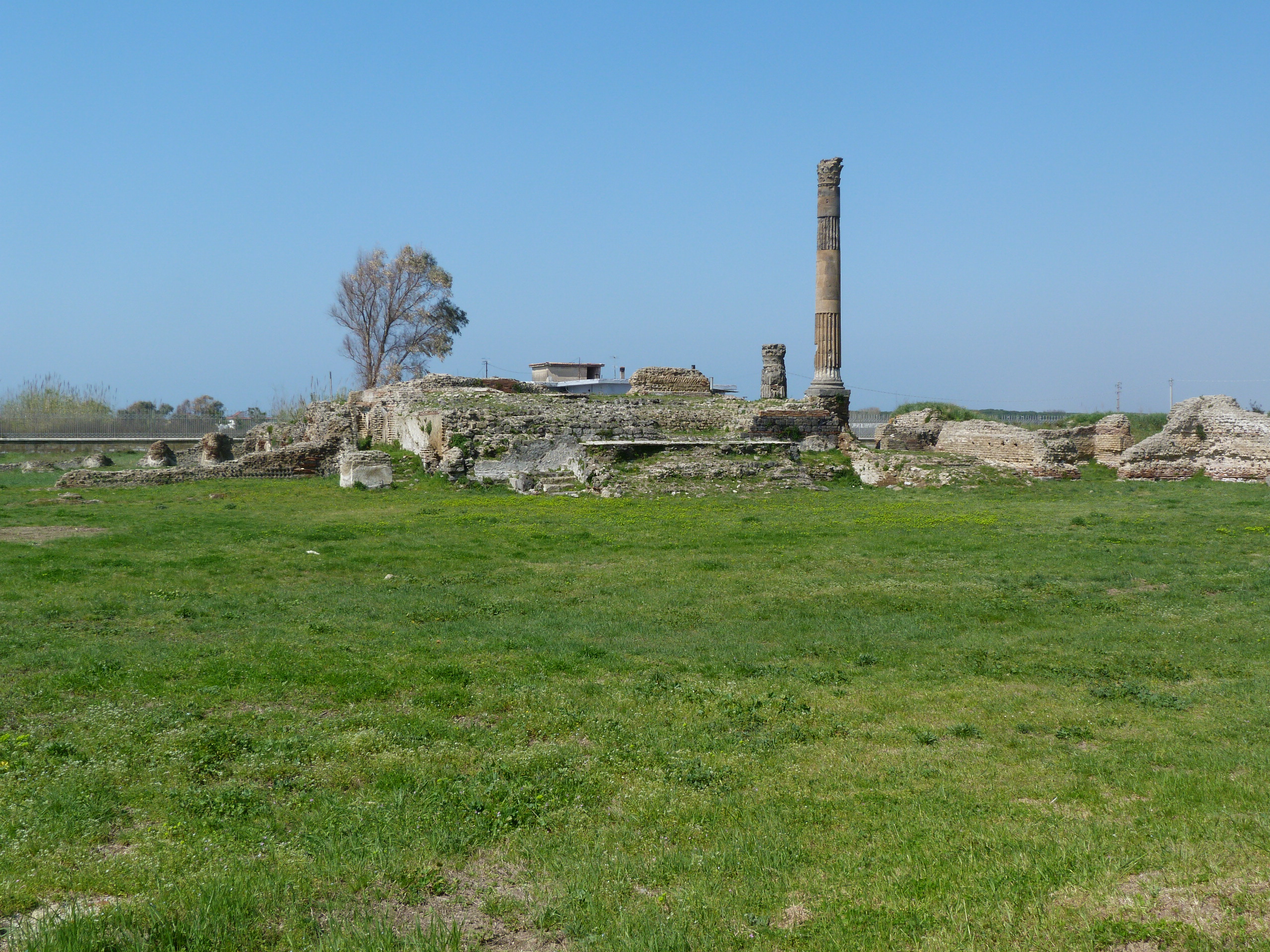
- Ruins of Liternum, Lago Patria
- Interactive map of Liternum
- Type: Settlement
- Location: Giugliano in Campania, Province of Naples, Italy
- Region: Campania

Site notes
- Management: Soprintendenza per i Beni Archeologici di Napoli
- Public access: Yes
- Website: Sito Archeologico di Liternum (in Italian)

Liternum was an ancient town of Campania, southern central Italy, near "Patria Lake", on the low sandy coast between Cumae and the mouth of the Volturnus. It was probably once dependent on Cumae. In 194 BC it became a Roman colony. Although Livy records that the town was unsuccessful, excavation reveals a Roman town existed there until the 4th century AD.

== History ==
The town is mainly famous as the residence of the elder Scipio Africanus, who withdrew from Rome and died there. His tomb and villa are described by Seneca the Younger in his Moral Letters to Lucilius. In letter LXXXVI, Seneca describes the villa as being built with squared stone blocks with towers on both sides.

In Ovid's Metamorphoses Liternum is mentioned for its mastic trees: lentisciferum... Liternum. Augustus Caesar is said to have conducted a colony of veterans to Liternum.

The construction of the Via Domitiana through Liternum made it a posting station, but the town later had a malaria outbreak and went into decline. In 455, the town was pillaged and destroyed by Genseric, king of the Vandals, with the surviving population migrating towards the site of present-day Giugliano in Campania.

Excavations between 1930 and 1936 brought to light some elements of the city center (a forum with a podium temple from the early years of the town, a basilica and a small theater). Outside the city walls, the remains of the amphitheater and the necropolis have been identified.

== Sources and external links ==
- The Hunterian Museum's page on Liternum, with maps and photos.
