= Villaricca =

Villaricca Panecuócole (Neapolitan)
- Comune
- Comune di Villaricca
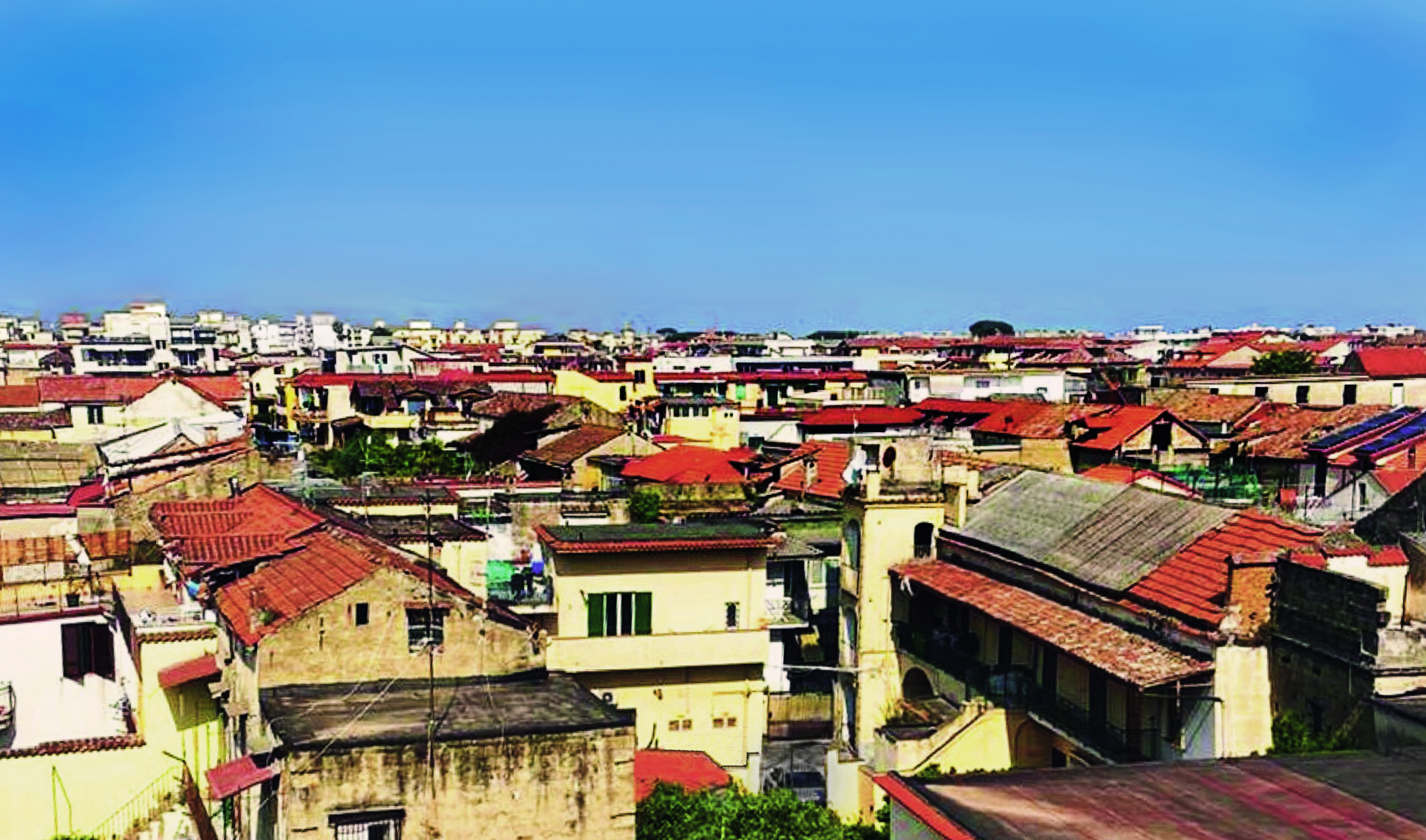

- Location within Italy Location within Campania
- Coordinates: 40°55′N 14°12′E
- Country: Italy
- Region: Campania
- Metropolitan city: Naples (NA)

Government
  - Mayor: Maria Rosaria Punzo

Area
  - Total: 6.8 km^{2} (2.6 sq mi)
- Elevation: 103 m (338 ft)

Population (30 September 2015)
  - Total: 31,089
  - Density: 4,600/km^{2} (12,000/sq mi)
- Demonym: Villaricchèsi
- Time zone: UTC+1 (CET)
  - Summer (DST): UTC+2 (CEST)
- Postal code: 80010
- Dialing code: 081
- Website: Official website

Villaricca, known until 17 May 1871 as Panicocoli (Neapolitan: Panecuócole), is a comune (municipality) in the Metropolitan City of Naples in the Italian region of Campania, located about 10 km northwest of Naples.

It is the birthplace of popular Italian singer Sergio Bruni and the venerable physician and priest Vittorio De Marino.

== Geography ==
Villaricca borders the following municipalities: Calvizzano, Giugliano in Campania, Marano di Napoli, Mugnano di Napoli, Qualiano and Quarto.
