= 5th municipality of Naples =

Fifth Municipality of Naples Municipalità 5 Quinta Municipalità
- Borough
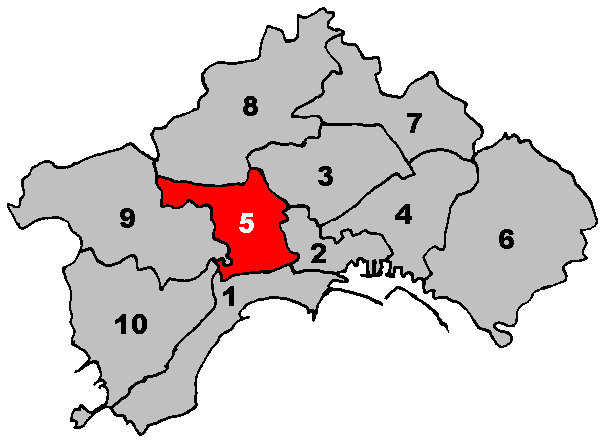
- Location within Naples
- Coordinates: 40°50′40.77″N 14°14′4.97″E
- Country: Italy
- Municipality: Naples
- Established: 2005
- Seat: Via Morghen 84, Via Giacinto Gigante 242

Government
  - President: Paolo De Luca

Area
  - Total: 7.42 km^{2} (2.86 sq mi)

Population (2007)
  - Total: 119,978
  - Density: 16,000/km^{2} (42,000/sq mi)
- Website: M5 on Naples site

The Fifth Municipality (In Italian: Quinta Municipalità or Municipalità 5) is one of the ten boroughs in which the Italian city of Naples is divided. It is the most populated municipality.

== Geography ==
The municipality is located in central-western area of the city.

Its territory includes the zones of Rione Alto, Rione Antignano, Petraio, Materdei and Parco Grifeo.

== Administrative division ==
The Fifth Municipality is divided into 2 quarters:

Quarter	Population	Area (km^{2})
Arenella	72,031	5.25
Vomero	47,947	2.17
Total	119,978	7.42
