= Pinelli =

Pinelli is an Italian surname and may refer to:

- Antonia Bertucci-Pinelli (died c. 1640), Italian painter of the Baroque
- Babe Pinelli (1895–1984), American baseball umpire
- Bartolomeo Pinelli (1771–1835), Italian illustrator and engraver
- Dario Pinelli (born 1982), Italian jazz guitarist
- German Pinelli (1907–1996), Cuban journalist and actor
- Gian Vincenzo Pinelli (1535–1601), Italian humanist and botanist
- Giuseppe Pinelli (1928–1969), Italian anarchist
- Pino Pinelli (1938–2024), Italian painter
- Tullio Pinelli (1908–2009), Italian screenwriter

It can also be a reference to:

- the Pinelli–Walckenaer Atlas, a 14th-century atlas

== See also ==
- Prince of Belmonte
