= Alain Chivilò =

Alain Chivilò or Chivilo in art and culture is a living Italian contemporary curator, critic, journalist and writer based in Italy with collaborations outside his home country. Since the 1990s, Alain Chivilò has developed his first interests and insights into culture and particularly visual arts. The university education was divided into materiality and abstraction in the specializations of business administration and art history. The culture of the city of Venice was a source of inspiration and a starting point, while also broadening Chivilò's own culture. In particular, a group of figurative painters focused on landscape, nature, still life and portraits such as Marco Novati, Eugenio Da Venezia, Neno Mori, Carlo Dalla Zorza, Fioravante Seibezzi, Aldo Bergamini, Gigi candiani, Cosimo Privato and Mario Varagnolo opened his sensitivity to art more. (Note: Source details: Alvize Zorzi, Venice, 2009) In this context the art monographs Gigi Candiani Tessere di vita, (Note: Publication details: A. Chivilò Gigi Candiani Tessere di vita Alcione editore, 2013. ISBN 9788888669458) Marco Novati Volti Vissuti (Note: Publication details: A. Chivilò Marco Novati Volti Vissuti. A. Moro Editore, 2015. ISBN 9788890759093) and Gigi Candiani Atmosfere Rarefatte (Note: Publication details: A. Chivilò Gigi Candiani Atmosfere Rarefatte. A. Moro Editore, 2016. ISBN 9788899736095) triggered a debate about the importance of these figurative artists in modern Italian art. (Note: Source details: Gigi Candiani book presentation. Ateneo Veneto, Venice, 2014) Examining the professional path of Alain Chivilò, in art criticism a sort of deep expressive simplicity emerges that should not be confused with banality, while in the organization of events a constant research is placed. (Note: Source details: Marco Novati book presentation, Caio Giulio Cesare hall, Mestre, 2015) In press, as freelance journalist, (Note: Accredited to the Italian Register of Journalists Publicisti:) he writes for various national and international newspapers and magazines, interviewing artists as for example Sir Anthony Caro, Marc Quinn, Shozo Shimamoto, Hermann Nitsch, Jacques Villeglé, Fabrizio Plessi, Gianni Berengo Gardin, Riccardo Licata, Eugenio Carmi, Achille Perilli, Luca Alinari, Alberto Biasi, Xu Deqi, Helidon Xhixha. In June 2017 all these art contacts, that involved him, have been published in a book. (Note: Publication details: A. Chivilò Tracce Segni Macchie Bruciature Concetti Scatti Tagli Buchi A. Moro Editore, 2017.) In summary, interviews, reviews of cultural events, critical texts and presentations of modern and contemporary artists are important steps for a real critical examination. Yesterday as today as per events and news, Alain Chivilò continues his activity in art and culture promoting with seriousness and professionalism. (Note: Source details: Maurizio Monti, Mantua, 2020)

== Publications ==
Recent catalogue essays include: "Giuseppe D'Ina Enigmi Sensoriali" (2024), Andrea D'Ina Processi Percettivi" (2024), "Cinzia Bulone Fascino sommerso" (2023), "Giuseppe Marcotti Codici visivi" (2022), "Ennio Bastiani Esplorazioni umane" (2022), "Helga Gendriesch Visionen" (2021), "Cinzia Bulone Fragili Atmosfere" (2021), "Silvio Formichetti In" (2020),"Donald Martiny Divine Material" (2019), "Alfredo Rapetti Mogol Parole Svelate" (2019), "Materials: Pino Pinelli, Elio Marchegiani, Mario Ceroli, Piero Gilardi, Roberto Barni, Enzo Cacciola, Umberto Mariani, Armando Marrocco, Giuseppe Uncini, Getulio Alviani, Jannis Kounellis, Alberto Burri and Gioni David Parra" (2018), "Antonio Amodio Fisionomie Elettive" (2017), "Piero Slongo Ars" (2016), "Paola Romano Moon" (2015), "Stefano Benazzo La Naturalezza dell’Istante" (2015), "Cinzia Pellin Cinemart: Omaggio al Cinema Italiano" (2013) and more. Edited monographs include: "Tracce Segni Macchie Bruciature Concetti Scatti Tagli Buchi" 2017, "Gigi Candiani Atmosfere Rarefatte" 2016, "Marco Novati Volti Vissuti" 2015 and more.
