= Silvio Formichetti =

Italian painter (born 1969)

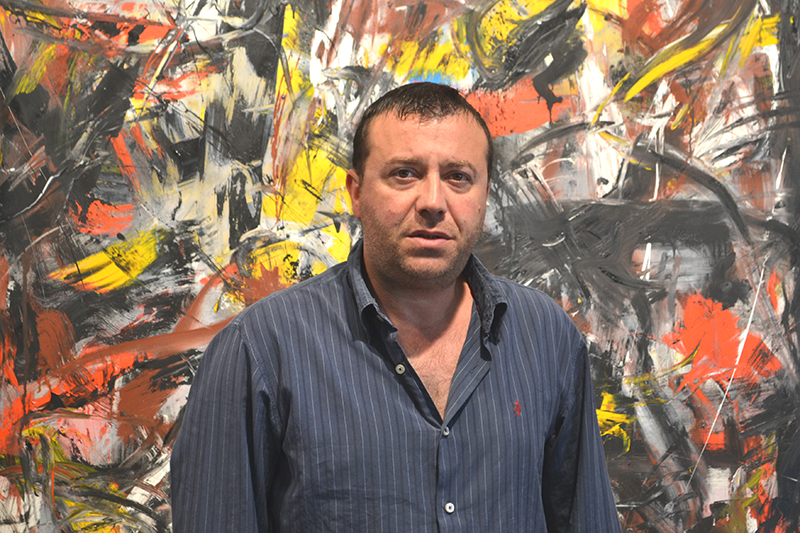
- Born: 20 March 1969; Pratola Peligna
- Known for: painting
- Movement: Abstract expressionism informal Action painting
- Spouse: Beatrice Terrafina

Silvio Formichetti (born 20 March 1969 in Pratola Peligna) is an Italian painter. His work mainly comprises abstract and informal paintings and drawings.

== History ==
Silvio Formichetti was born in 1969 in Pratola Peligna, in the province of L'Aquila. Formichetti's first works centred around two themes: the landscapes of Abruzzo and female nudes

Since the mid-1990s, he became intrigued by the informal painting of Jackson Pollock and his dripping technique, known as Action Painting. The works of Hans Hartung and Formichetti's compatriots Afro Basaldella and Emilio Vedova were also a source of inspiration for his own abstract style of painting.

Most of his paintings are characterized by powerful primary colours such as red, yellow and blue, combined with black and white. Formichetti's visual style has evolved over the years, but remains colourful, emotionally charged and experimental. Since 1999 he has also incorporated more symbolism into his works. He expresses himself through two fundamental instruments: paint brushes and spatulas.

On the request of Vittorio Sgarbi, Silvio Formichetti was in 2011 one of the exhibitors at the Italian Pavilion of the 54th Venice Biennale. Since then he is considered as one of the major Italian representatives of informal painting.

For years Formichetti has also realized works of live painting and bodypainting. His performances manage to reach an ever-increasing audience through the power of artistic expression.

His work has been exhibited in several museums in Italy, Bulgaria and Germany. In November 2013, a solo exhibition took place at the European Parliament in Brussels in the Altiero Spinelli building. This exhibition, curated by the artist, included twenty medium-sized works created especially for the event.

Formichetti has art studios in Pratola Peligna, Rome and Vomero (Naples). His studio in Pratola Peligna has already been visited by several fellow artists, including Mark Kostabi.

In 2014 Formichetti was a guest on three occasions in the actuaprogram TG2 Italia, RAI's news channel. A year later, art expert Stefano Sassi made a documentary for the RAI about the life and art of Silvio Formichetti, which has been broadcast on Rai 5.

== Exhibitions ==
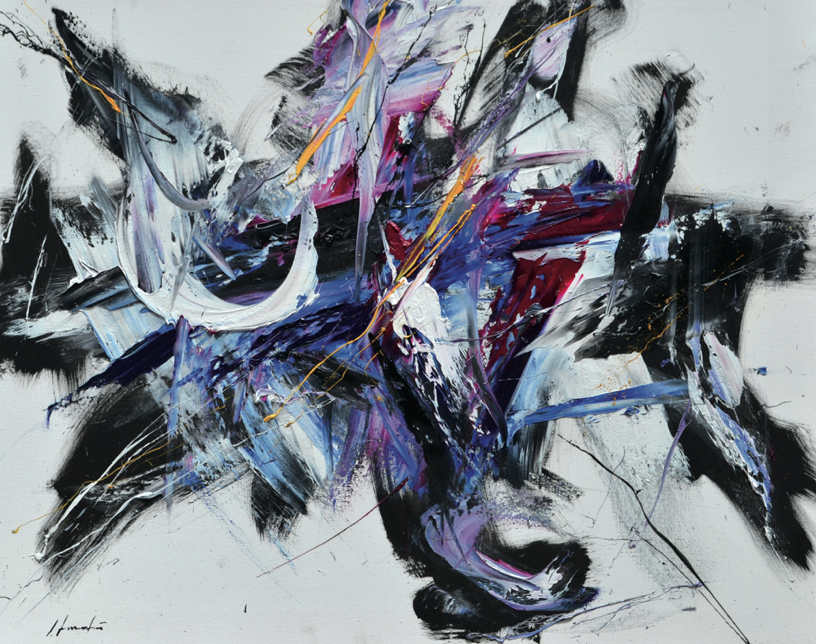
Folle gestualità, 60×70 cm, Olio su tela, 2012

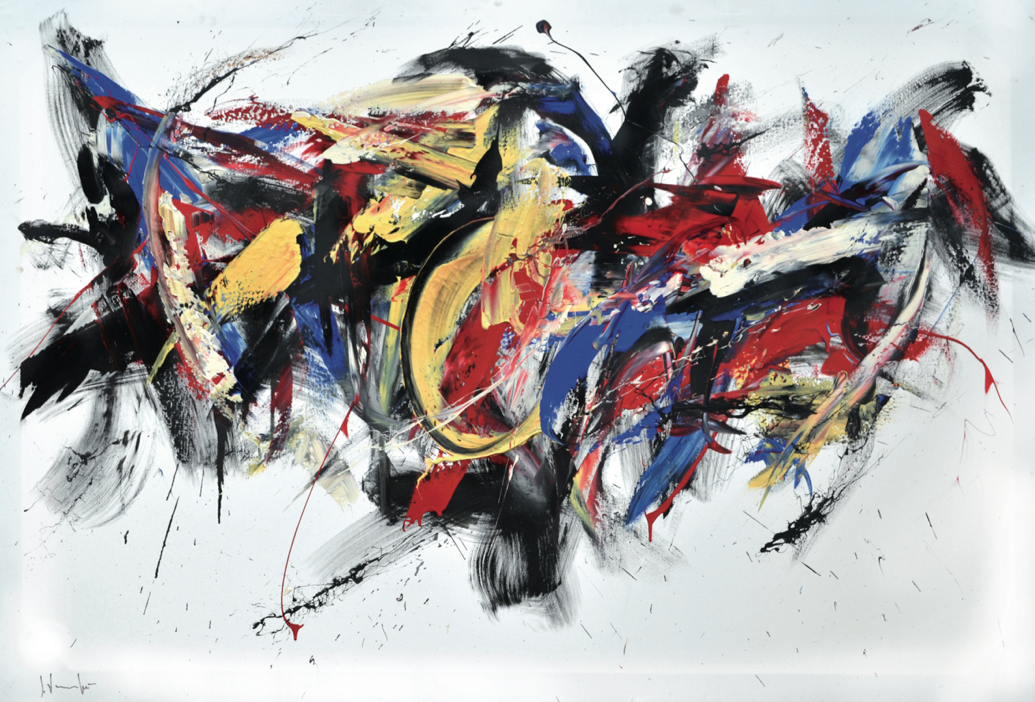
Tempi lineari, 100×150 cm, Tecnica mista su tela, 2013

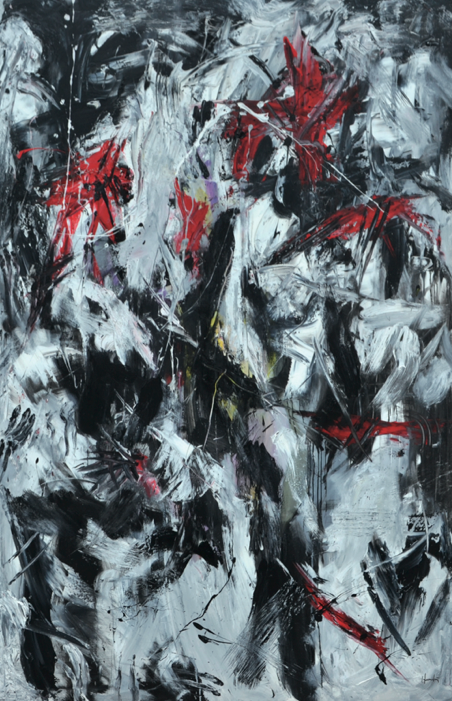
Energheia, 198,5×128,5 cm, Olio su tela, 2011

- International exhibitions of Sulmona (different editions from 1999 to 2016);
- Exhibition in het Palazzetto dei Nobili dell’Aquila
- Abruzzo National Museum of L'Aquila;
- Museo nazionale degli strumenti musicali in Rome (2006);
- Diocesan Museum "Francesco Gonzaga" in Mantua (2007);
- National Museum of Palazzo Venezia (2007);
- Michetti Museum in Francavilla al Mare (2007);
- Museum of San Gabriele, Isola del Gran Sasso d'Italia (2008);
- "Cromofobie", Ex Aurum of Pescara (2009);
- Exhibition in the Palazzo Guicciardini of the province of Milan (2010);
- Colonna Museum in Pescara (2010);
- Museum of Sulmona (2010);
- 54th Venice Biennale, presented by Vittorio Sgarbi (2011);
- Chiostro del Bramante (Klooster van Bramante) in Rome (2011);
- Exhibition "Alphabet of the Soul" in Palazio Oda in Albenga (2011)
- Exhibition "The Big Rip" in de Opus Gallery in Grottammare (2012);
- Exhibition "Succisa Virescit" in Cassino in the Manzoni Theater (2012)
- National Gallery of Modern Art in Sofia, Bulgaria (2012);
- Graffity Art Gallery in Varna, Bulgaria (2012);
- Canovaccio Gallery in Terni (2013);
- Civic Gallery van Padua (2013);
- European Parliament in Brussels, Belgium (2013);
- Aurum – Factory of Ideas in Pescara (2014);
- Taverna Ducale in Popoli in Pescara (2014);
- Soloshow InArt Werkkunst Gallery, Berlin, Germany (2015);
- Rocca in Umbertide (PG) (2016);
- Complesso della Santissima Annunziata in Sulmona (2017);
- Exhibition ‘Il silenzio che urla" in Ascoli Piceno (2018);
- Exhibition "Vulcanico" in Galleria Contempo, Pergine Valsugana (Trente (stad) |Trente) (2018);
- Exhibition "Informale incontro" in Centro Cultura Villa Brivio in Nova Milanese (2018);
- Exhibition "I mille di Sgarbi", Magazzini del Sale in Cervia;
- CristianoArtGallery, Samo Collection, Ars Interamna in Pignataro Interamna
- Exhibition "In", Galleria Civica San Donà di Piave, Venice, 2020

== Bibliography ==
- Ab Imo Pectore (2019)
- Giorgio Di Genova, XXVI Premio Internazionale D'arte Sulmona, Catalogo generale, 1999
- Il silenzio che urla (2018)
- Sulmona Bimillenario Ovidiano (2017)
- 43º Premio Sulmona. Catalogo della rassegna (2016)
- Evoluzione del Silenzio Umbertide (Pg) a cura di Anna Amendolagine
- Maria Augusta Baitello, La Poetica dell'Essenza, Catalogo Personale, 2001
- Dizionario Enciclopedico Internazionale d'Arte – Moderna e Contemporanea – 2002/2003, Ferrari, Alba Edizioni, 2002
- Carlo Fabrizio Carli, Tracciati d'Arte in Abruzzo, 2002
- InArt Werkkunst Gallery – Berlino a cura di Marcello Lucci
- Prestigium Italia II – Luciano Benetton – Collection a cura di Luca Beatrice
- Claudio Strinati, XXXVI Premio Internazionale d'Arte Sulmona, Catalogo della rassegna, 2009
- 41º Premio Sulmona. Catalogo della Rassegna, (2014)
- I sentieri dell'anima, Lge edizioni, 2013, Roma (Italia)
- Energheia, Catalogo della mostra, Roma, Lge edizioni, 2013.
- Lorenzo Barbaresi, Emozioni Informali, Catalogo della mostra, Terni, Grafiche Celori, 2013
- Irina Mutafcieva e Anna Amendolagin, Bulgare Visioni, Roma, Lge edizioni, 2012.
- Simona Pace e Roberto Franco, Succisa Virescit, Catalogo della mostra, Roma, Lge edizioni 2012.
- Giarmandi Di Marti, The Big Rip Catalogo della mostra, 2012
- Vittorio Sgarbi, L' Arte non è cosa nostra, Catalogo realizzato in occasione della 54. Esposizione Internazionale d'Arte della Biennale di Venezia, Roma, Skira Edizioni, 2011.
- Paolo Levi, Il moto perpetuo della materia, Silvio Formichetti Catalogo Arte Moderna CAM n.47, Mondadori, 2011.
- Paolo Levi, Catalogo Arte Moderna CAM n.46, Mondadori, 2010.
- Giovanni Faccenda, Labirinti dell'anima, Catalogo della mostra, Giorgio Mondadori, 2010
- Silvia Pegoraro, Icone dell'invisibile Sulmona 2010
- Luca Beatrice, Il buio, confine del colore. Formichetti e Schifano: dialogo tra spirito e materia, Firenze, Vallecchi Edizioni Spa, 2010
- Silvia Pegoraro, Cromofobie. Percorsi del bianco e del nero nell'arte Italiana Contemporanea, Edizioni Gabriele Mazzotta, 2009
- Silvia Pegoraro, XIII Biennale d'arte sacra e contemporanea, 2008
- Luca Tommasi e Silvia Pegoraro, Le Forme dell'Anima, Catalogo della mostra, 2008
- Maurizio Gioia e Carlo Micheli, Riflessioni, PubliPaolini Edizioni, 2007
- Leo Strozzieri, XXXI Premio Internazionale Emigrazione, 2007
- Pierpaolo Bellucci e Leo Strozzieri, Silvio Formichetti ”Sospeso Percorso Inorganico", Sulmona, Catalogo Sinapsy Edizioni, 2007
- Luca Tommasi e Maria Selene Sconci, Silvio Formichetti ”Intime Confessioni”, Milano, Skira Edizioni, 2007
- Luca Tommasi e Maria Selene Sconci, Silvio Formichetti ”Viaggio Mistico”, Milano, Skira Edizioni, 2006
- Leo Strozzieri, XXVIII Premio Internazionale Emigrazione, 2004
- Carlo Fabrizio Carli, Silvio Formichetti ”Il Gesto e Il Colore”, 2003
- Alain Chivilò, Silvio Formichetti "In", Catalogo Mostra Personale, Padova, 2020
