= Castel Sant'Elmo =

Medieval fortress on Vomero Hill overlooking Naples, Italy

- Naples, Italy
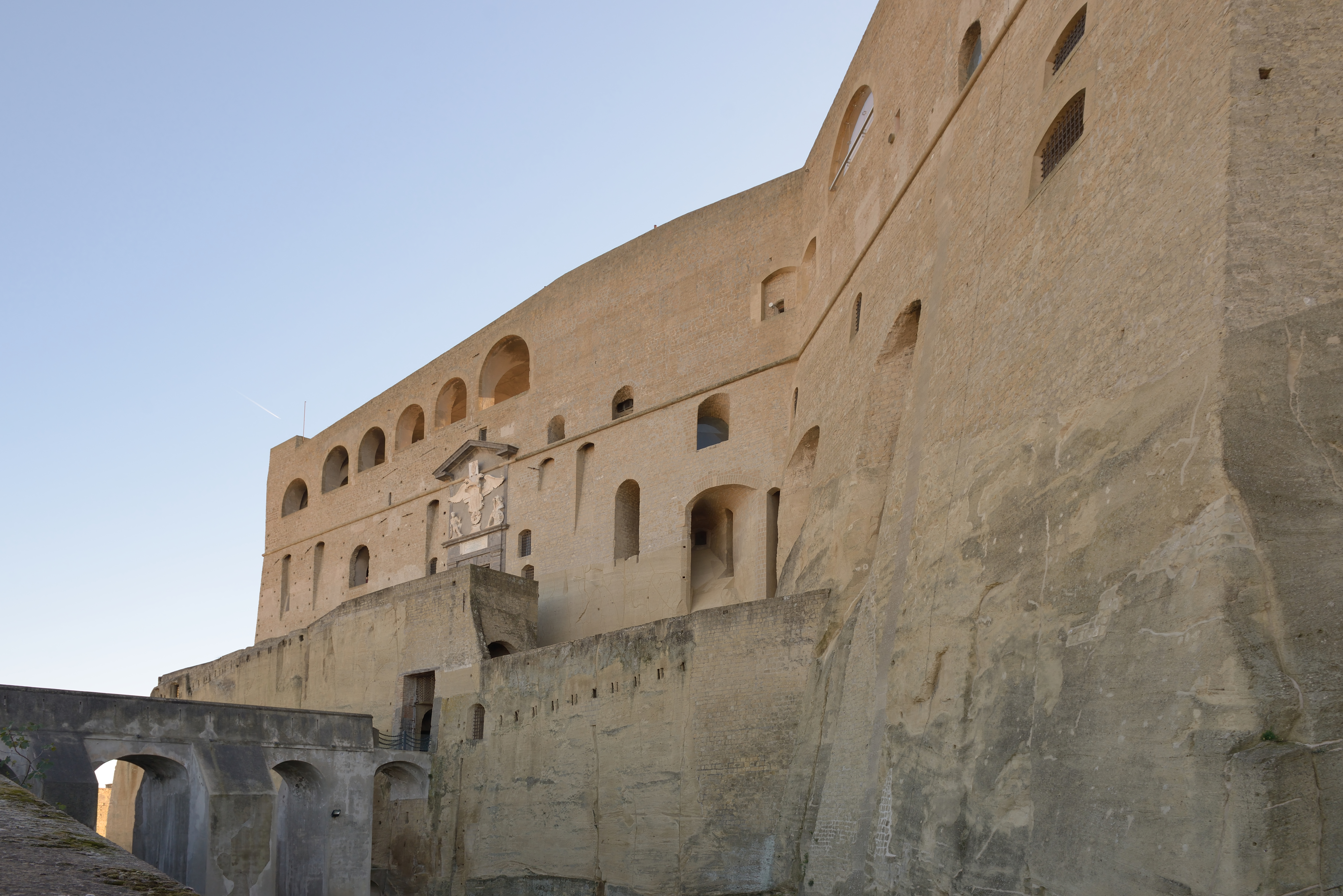
- The main entrance to Castel Sant'Elmo seen from northeast

Site information
- Owner: Comune di Napoli; City of Naples
- Controlled by: Napoli Beniculturali; Naples Ministry of Culture
- Open to the public: Yes
- Condition: Good

Location
- Coordinates: 40.843815°N 14.239005°E

Site history
- Built: 1200s (first building); 1537 (today's building)
- Built by: ? (1200s building); Don Pedro de Toledo (1537 fortress)
- In use: Still in use today
- Materials: Tuff

Castel Sant'Elmo is a medieval fortress located on Vomero Hill adjacent to the Certosa di San Martino, overlooking Naples, Italy. The name "Sant'Elmo" derives from a former 10th-century church dedicated to Sant'Erasmo, shortened to "Ermo" and ultimately altered to "Elmo". Located near the upper terminus of the Petraio, one of the city's earliest pedestrian connections between upper and lower Naples, the fortress now serves as a museum, exhibition hall, and offices.

== History ==
Documents date a structure at the site from 1275, from the era of Charles of Anjou. Known originally as Belforte, it was likely a fortified residence, surrounded by walls, its entrance gate marked by two turrets. In 1329, using designs by the Sienese architect Tino da Camaino, king Robert of Naples enlarged the fortress described in documents as palatium in summitatae montanae Sancti Erasmi. Camaino also supervised construction of the adjacent Carthusian monastery of San Martino. By 1336, the palace was referred to as a castrum or castle, and work continued under Camaino till his death in 1343.

Attanasio Primario and Francesco di Vico then directed construction. By 1348 documents refer to the building as castrum Sancti Erasmi, probably because a chapel dedicated to Saint Erasmus was originally located on the site. The Angevin fortress was severely damaged in an earthquake in 1456, which demolished the external walls and the towers.

The Aragonese rulers of Naples, and notably Don Pedro de Toledo, the first governor and cousin of the Viceroy, included it in a comprehensive scheme designed to fortify the land perimeter of the city, based on four separate strongholds. Castel Sant'Erasmo acquired its hexagonal star shape between 1537 and 1547 under the designs of Pedro Luis Escriva from Valencia, a military architect. The daring hexagonal shape drew fierce criticism from his contemporaries, to such an extent that in 1538 Escriva defended his design in a published Apologia.

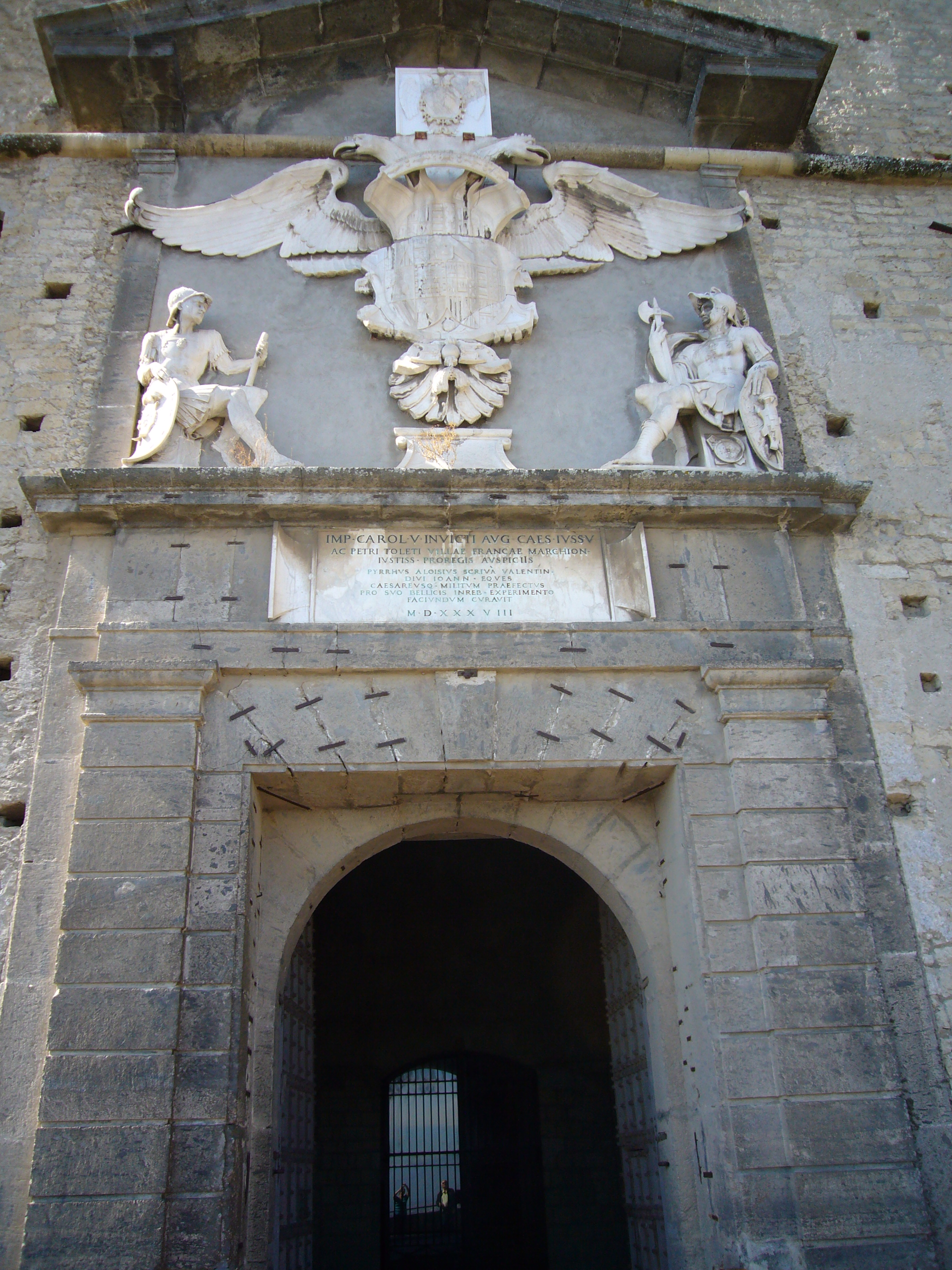
Entry gate with Imperial Eagle

In fact, with its double tenaille, numerous embrasures in the bastions and high walls surrounded by a moat, the castle was admirably suited to the topography of the site and the strategic and defensive functions. In 1538 a commemorative inscription was placed above the entrance gate, surmounted by Charles V's coat of arms and the two-headed Imperial eagle.

The castle served as an autonomous military outpost, with a governor who had absolute authority over both military and civilian matters. Around the parade grounds were situated the officers' quarters, chaplain's house, a church (1547) designed by the Spanish architect Pietro Prato, and the surviving buildings from the Angevin Belforte. Don Pedro de Toledo's funerary monument (1588) is found in the sacristy of the church.

In 1587 the munitions depot of the castle was struck by lightning, and exploded, destroying the church, the chaplain's house and the officers' quarters. Reconstruction was carried out between 1599 and 1601 under the architect Domenico Fontana. Despite successive rebuildings over the centuries, the castle conserves its original structure. Built of volcanic tufa, it overlords over Naples, and ever since the famous Tavola Strozzi incident (late 15th century), for centuries it was a symbol and bastion of government oppression. In 1604 it was used to imprison Tommaso Campanella, branded as a heretic, and in 1799 the patriots of the Neapolitan Revolution, including Gennaro Serra, Mario Pagano and Luigia Sanfelice. With the departure of the Bourbon garrison in 1860, it remained a military prison until 1952, when the prison was transferred to Gaeta.

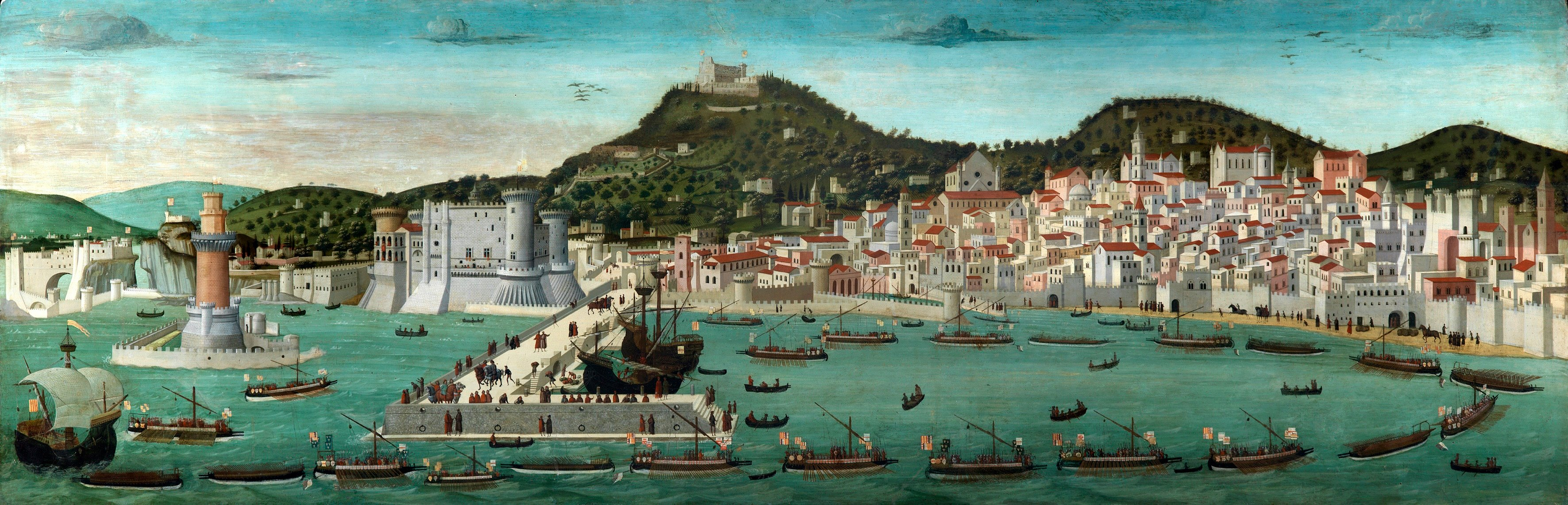
Painting by Francesco Rosselli, 1472. Castel Nuovo is visible before its remodeling, still showing damage from the 1456 earthquake.

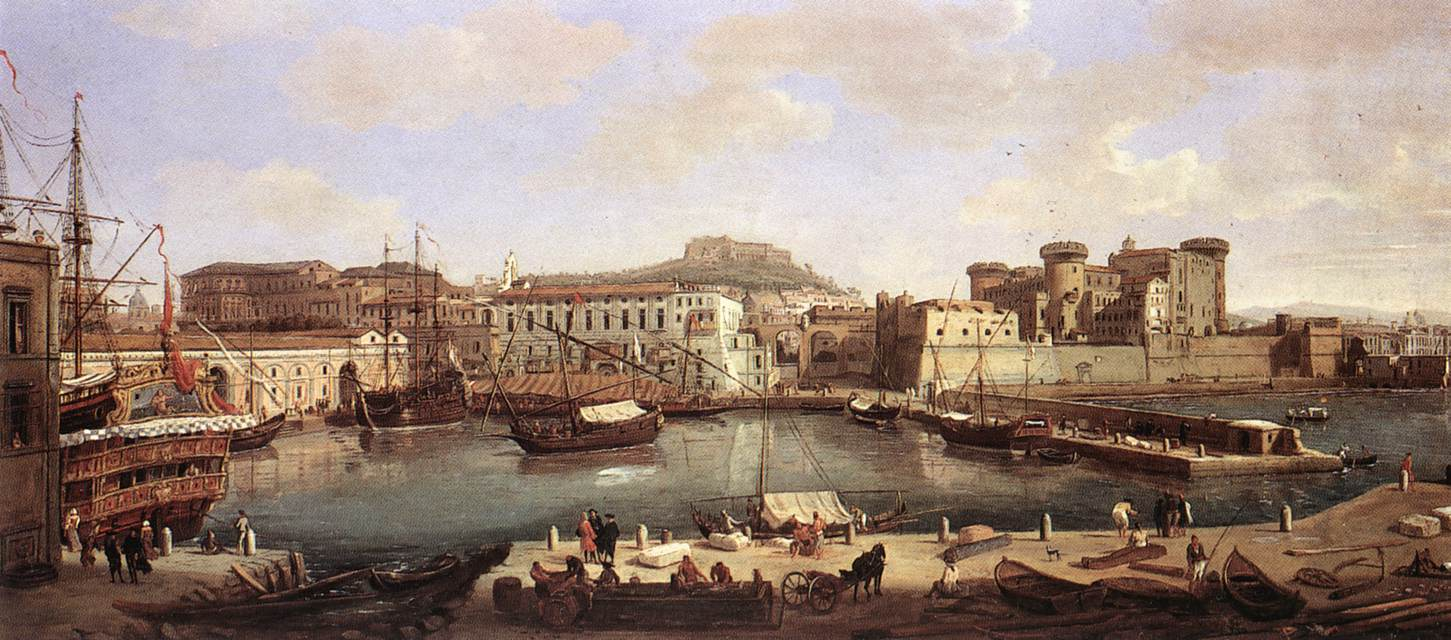
Veduta by Vanvitelli (1700–1710), with Castel Sant'Elmo on the hill and Castel Nuovo on the shore (right).

== Present ==
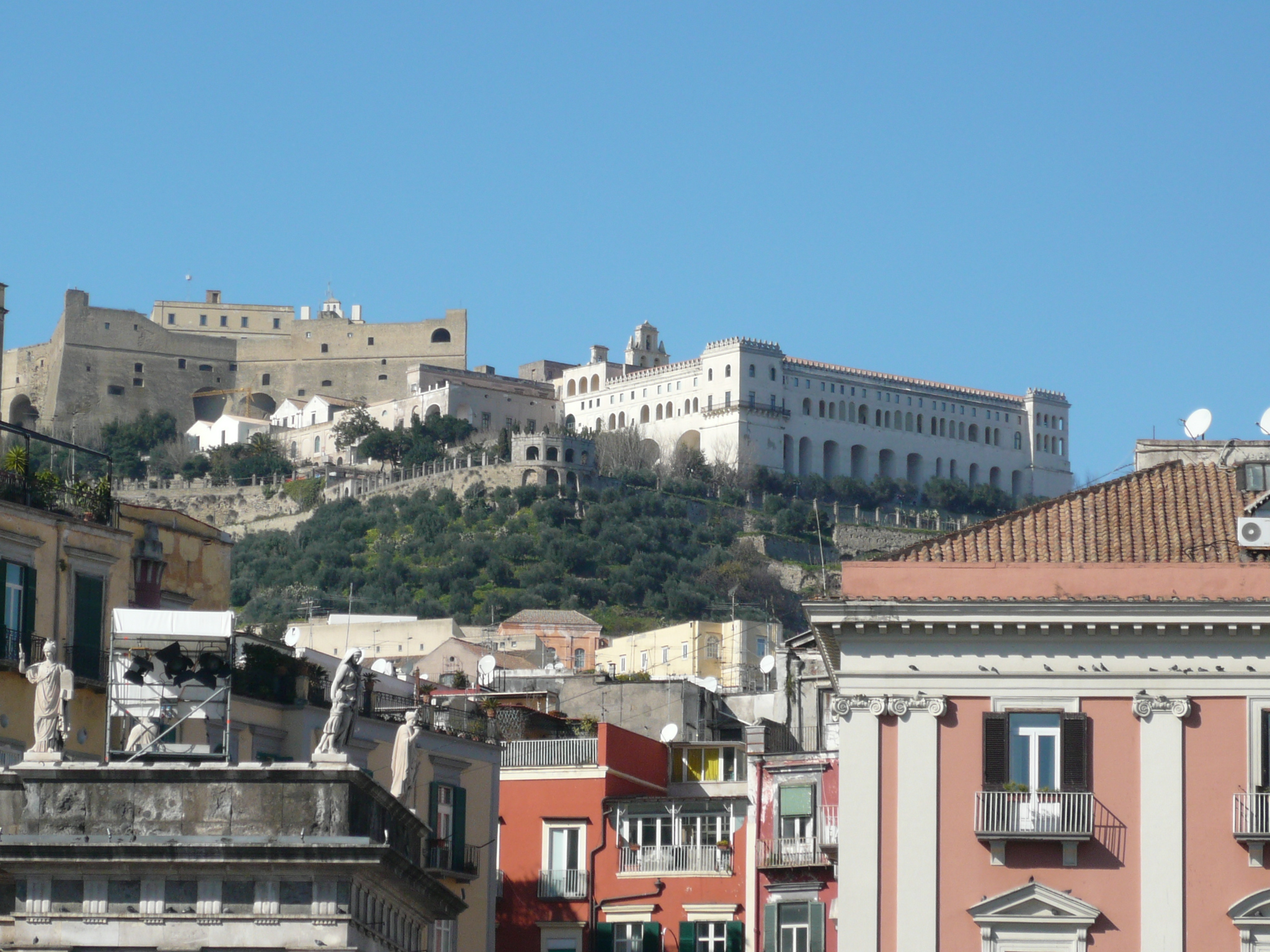
Castle and Certosa (right lower) viewed from Piazza del Plebiscito

It continued to be military property until 1976, when a large restoration project was undertaken by the provincial authority of the Provveditorato alle Opere Pubbliche of Campania. In seven years the original castle was freed of centuries of accretions, and made structurally sound, recreating the original galleries, parapet walkways and underground chambers, where an auditorium seating 700 has been created. In 1982 the site was handed over to the Soprintendenza per i Beni Artistici e Storici of Naples, and the Bruno Molajoli Art History Library was installed in an upper story of the old prison block.

The former Marine headquarters now houses the castle administration and some administrative offices for Naples, including the Catalogue Office, Photographic Archives and the Thefts Office.

There are now several permanent art exhibits in the castle, including a railing more than 30 feet long carrying a braille inscription, installed in 2015 above the drill grounds on the northernmost wall of the castle near the west corner. Two other installations include a large metal helmet near the railing and a conical metal sculpture, approximately 15 feet in diameter at the bottom, with cutouts in the drill grounds.

== Sources ==
- Fiorentino, Katia (2000). Spinosa, Nicola (ed.). Castel Sant'Elmo. Naples: Ministero per i Beni e le Attivita Culturali.
- A handbook for travellers in southern Italy by John Murray (Firm), page 99–100. 1883.
