= Certosa di San Martino =

Former Carthusian monastery in Naples, Italy

Coordinates: 40.8431°N 14.2411°E

National Museum of San Martino
- Museo nazionale di San Martino
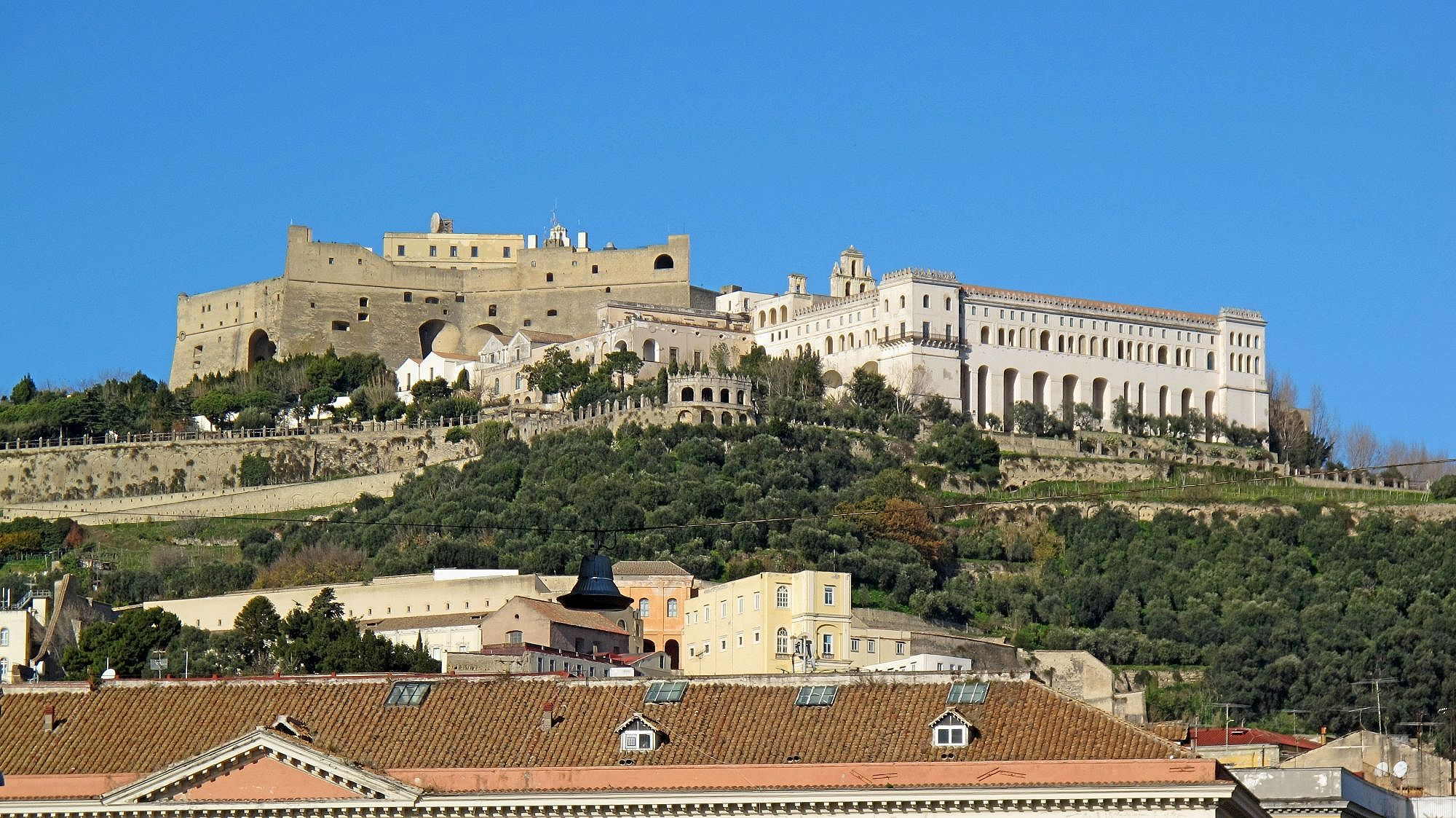
- The San Martino museum in Naples with Sant'Elmo fortress visible behind it.
- Established: 1866
- Location: Naples
- Type: Art museum, History museum
- Visitors: 136,935 (2016)
- Director: Rita Pastorelli
- Website: Official website

The Certosa di San Martino ("Charterhouse of St. Martin") is a former monastery complex, now a museum, in Naples, southern Italy. Along with Castel Sant'Elmo that stands beside it, this is the most visible landmark of the city, perched atop the Vomero hill that commands the gulf. A Carthusian monastery, it was finished and inaugurated under the rule of Joan I of Naples in 1368. It was dedicated to St. Martin of Tours. During the first half of the 16th century it was expanded. Later, in 1623, it was further expanded and became, under the direction of architect Cosimo Fanzago, essentially the structure one sees today.

A masterpiece of baroque architecture it was expanded during the counter reformation. Amongst the murals, as you enter the church, is a depiction of Henry VIII suppression and destruction of the London Charterhouse.

In 1799 anti-clerical French forces of occupation suppressed the monastery and forced the monks to flee. In the ensuing decades the monks made several attempts to reestablish their charter house, with the last effort failing in 1866, when the state definitively confiscated the property. Today, the buildings house the National Museum of San Martino with a display of Spanish and Bourbon era artifacts, as well as displays of the presepe—Nativity scene—considered to be among the finest in the world.

== National Museum of San Martino ==
The National Museum of San Martino is a museum opened to the public in Naples in 1866, after the unification of Italy, after the Charterhouse included among the suppressed ecclesiastical assets was declared a national monument.

By the will of the Neapolitan archaeologist Giuseppe Fiorelli, the rooms were intended to collect in a museum evidence of the life of Naples and the southern Kingdoms (Kingdom of Naples and Kingdom of Sicily first and the Kingdom of the Two Sicilies after). The museum, which is spread over two levels, is accessed from the two cloisters of the charterhouse.

Since December 2014, the Ministry of Cultural Heritage and Activities has been managing the museum and charterhouse through the Campania museum complex, which in December 2019 became the Regional Directorate for Museums.

== Gallery ==
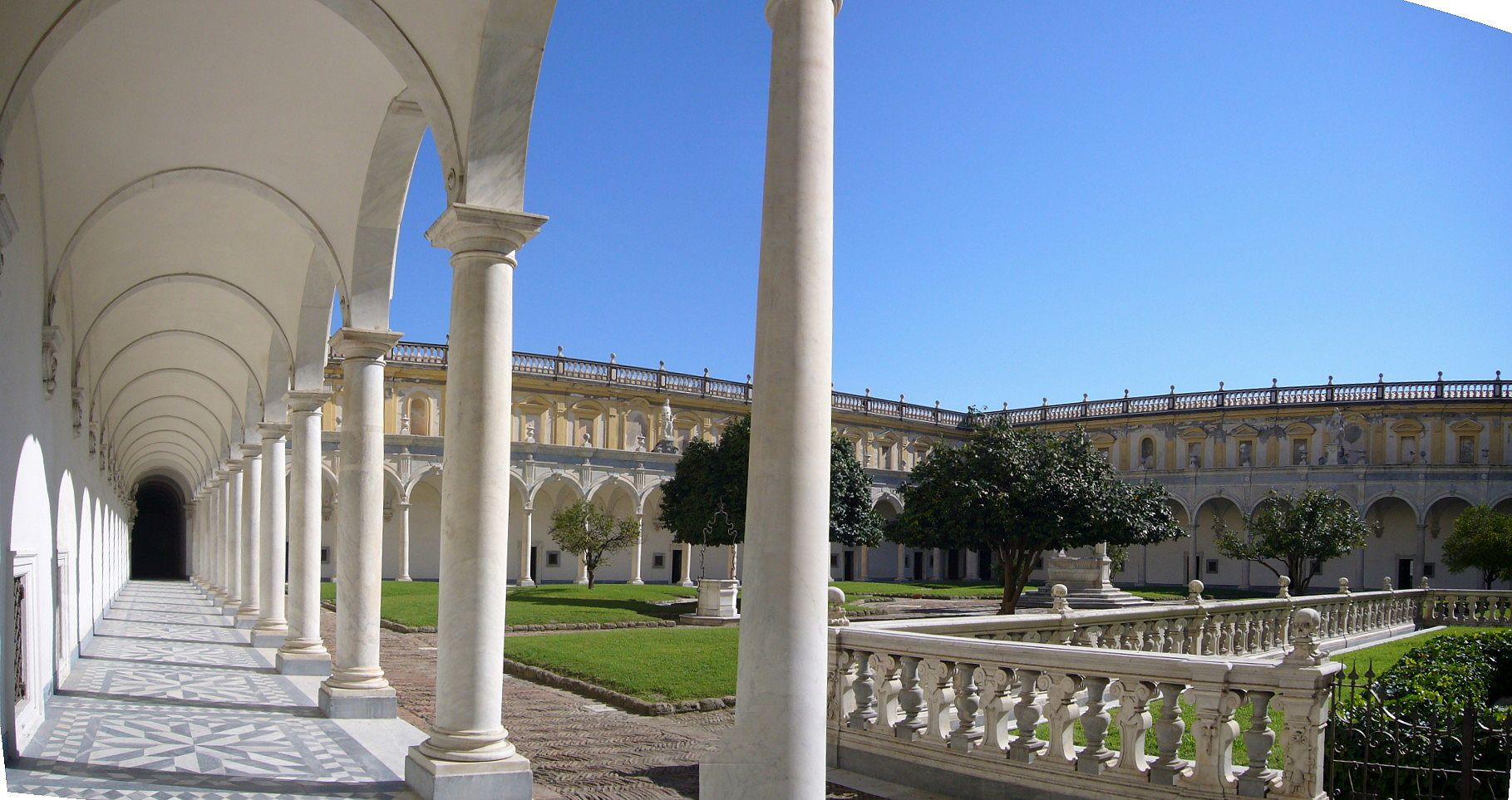
The major cloister

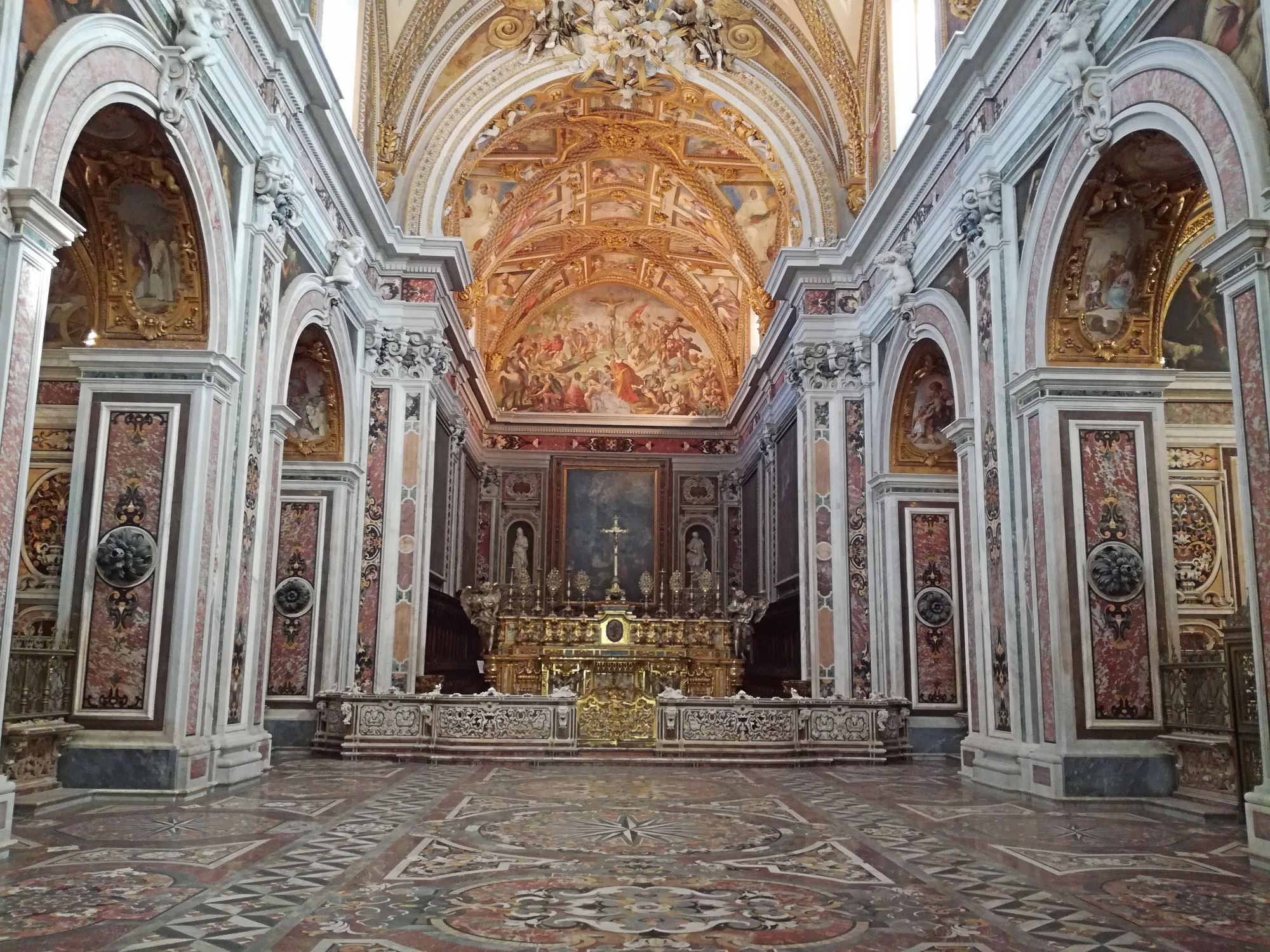
Interior of the main church

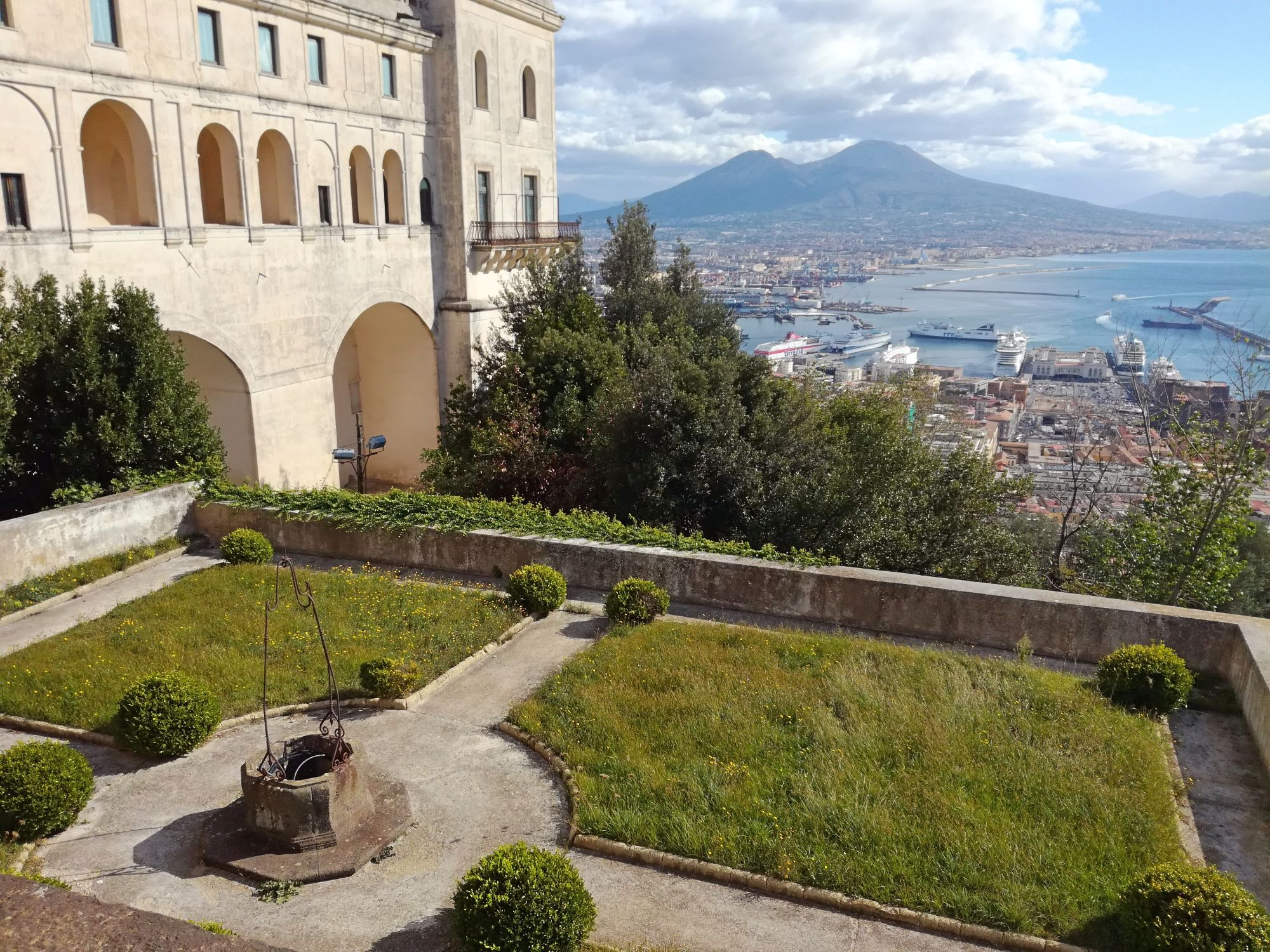
Hanging gardens

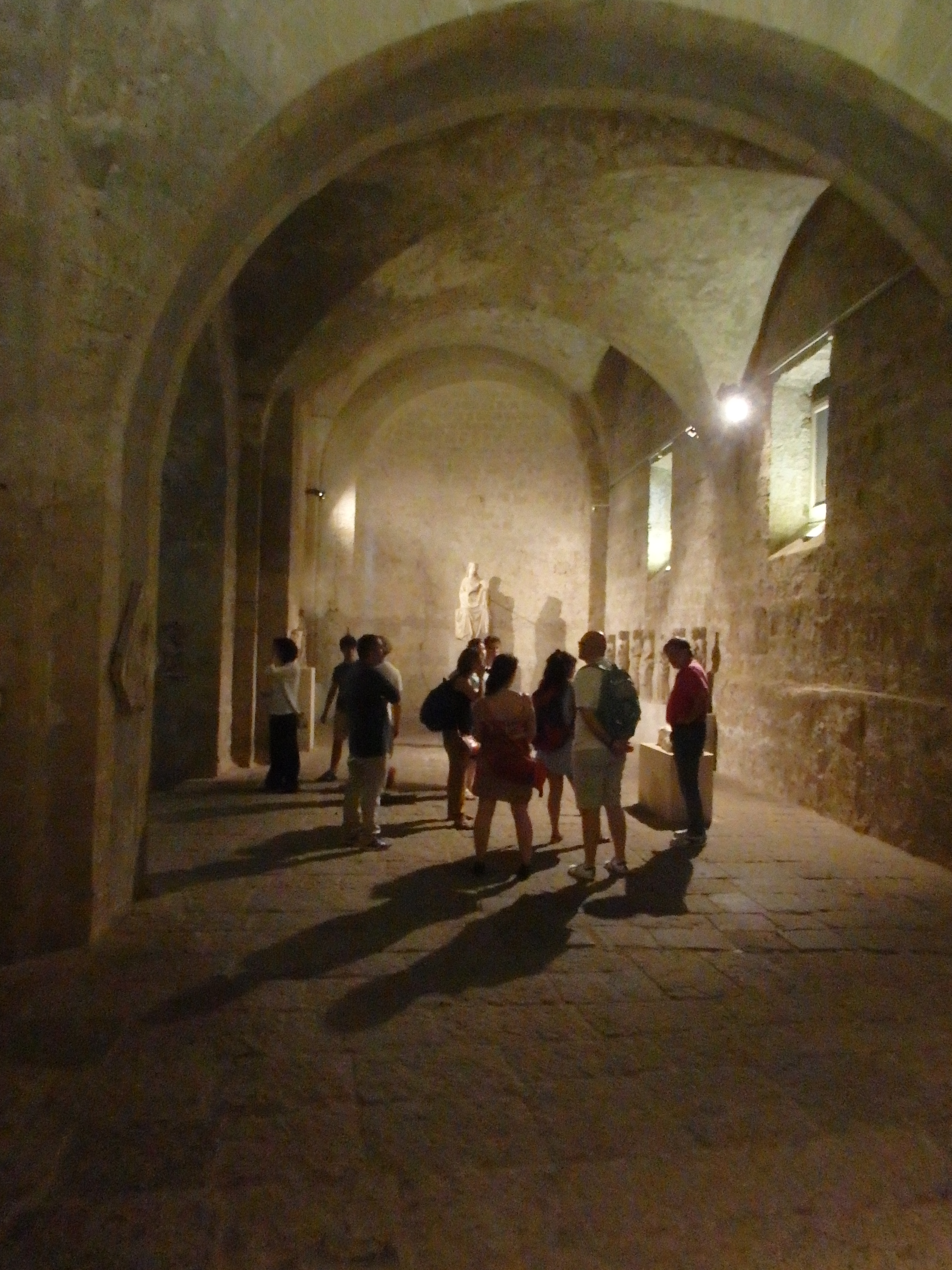
The underground of the Charterhouse

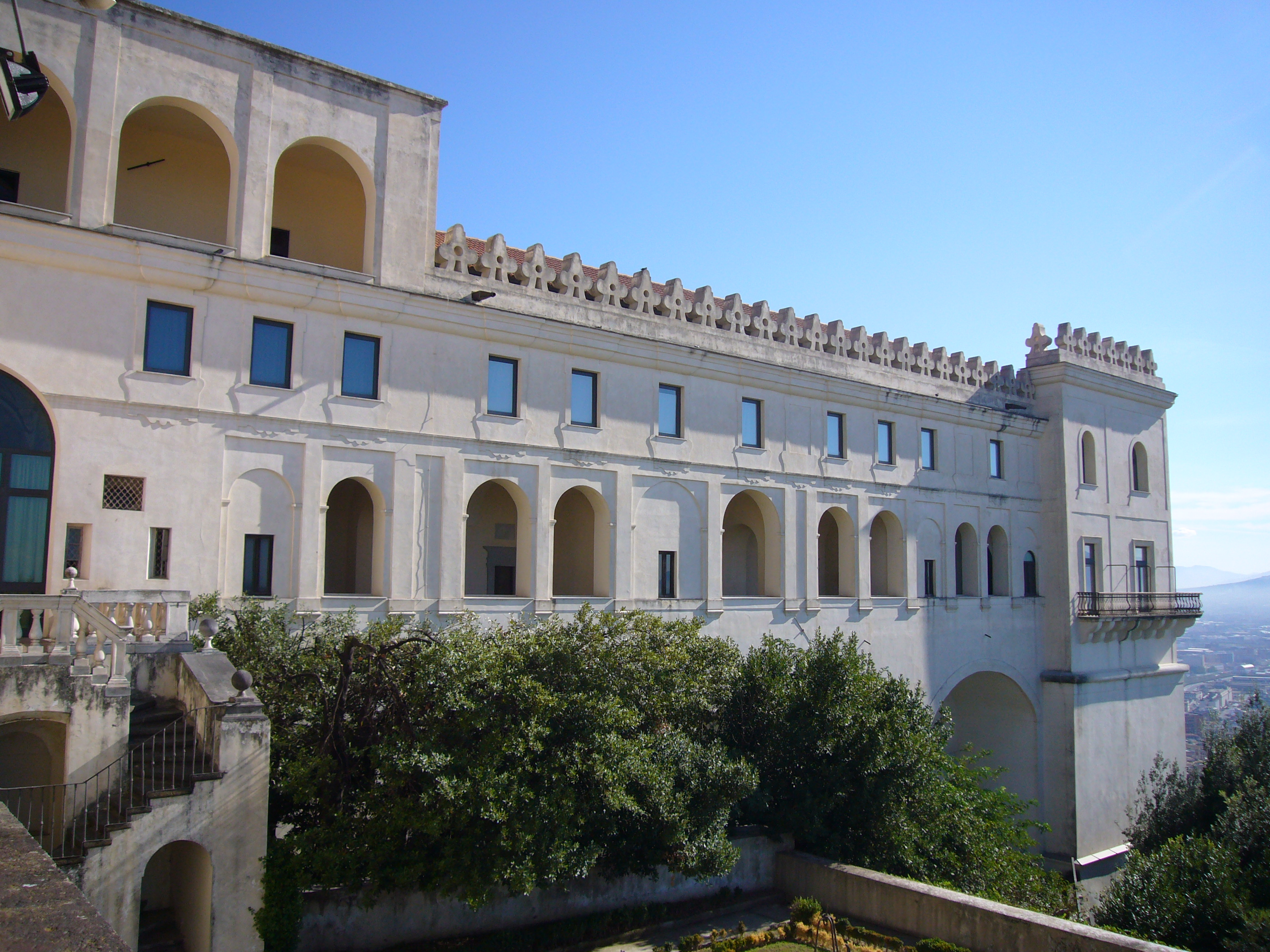
Museum entrance
