= Liceo Sannazaro =

Liceo Ginnasio Statale "J. Sannazaro"
- Naples; Italy

Information
- Type: Public school (government funded)
- Established: 1919
- Enrollment: ~1,200

The Liceo Ginnasio Statale "J. Sannazaro", commonly called the Liceo Sannazaro, is a co-educational state secondary school in the Vomero hill quarter of Naples. The c. 1,200 pupils are drawn from across the Neapolitan urban area, although preference is given to children from Vomero and the adjacent Arenella quarter. As a liceo classico it offers a traditional classical curriculum with a strong concentration on Italian, Latin and Greek. Alternative syllabi are available for some degree of specialisation in foreign languages, mathematics and computer science, or history of art.

The school opened in 1919 as the 'Regio Liceo-Ginnasio del Vomero', an autonomous offshoot of the Vittorio Emanuele school with premises in Via Morghen. The following year it received the title of Sannazaro, after the Neapolitan poet and Renaissance humanist Jacopo Sannazaro. The school was co-educational from the start with six girls included in the first intake of 35; of the 230–230 pupils who attended classes during the first four years, around a third where female. One of the reasons for building the school in Vomero was to assuage the anxieties of its residents regarding the potential dangers and temptations their daughters could face if they were to travel down into the city every day for their education.

In 1938 the school moved to its current site in Via Puccini, opening on 28 October 'in the name of Mussolini'. During the September 1943 Four days of Naples, the uprising against Nazi occupation, the school served as Vomero's resistance headquarters. Twenty of its students were killed in the fighting: their funeral, which took place after the Allies had entered the city, was recorded by Robert Capa.
