= Stairways in Naples =

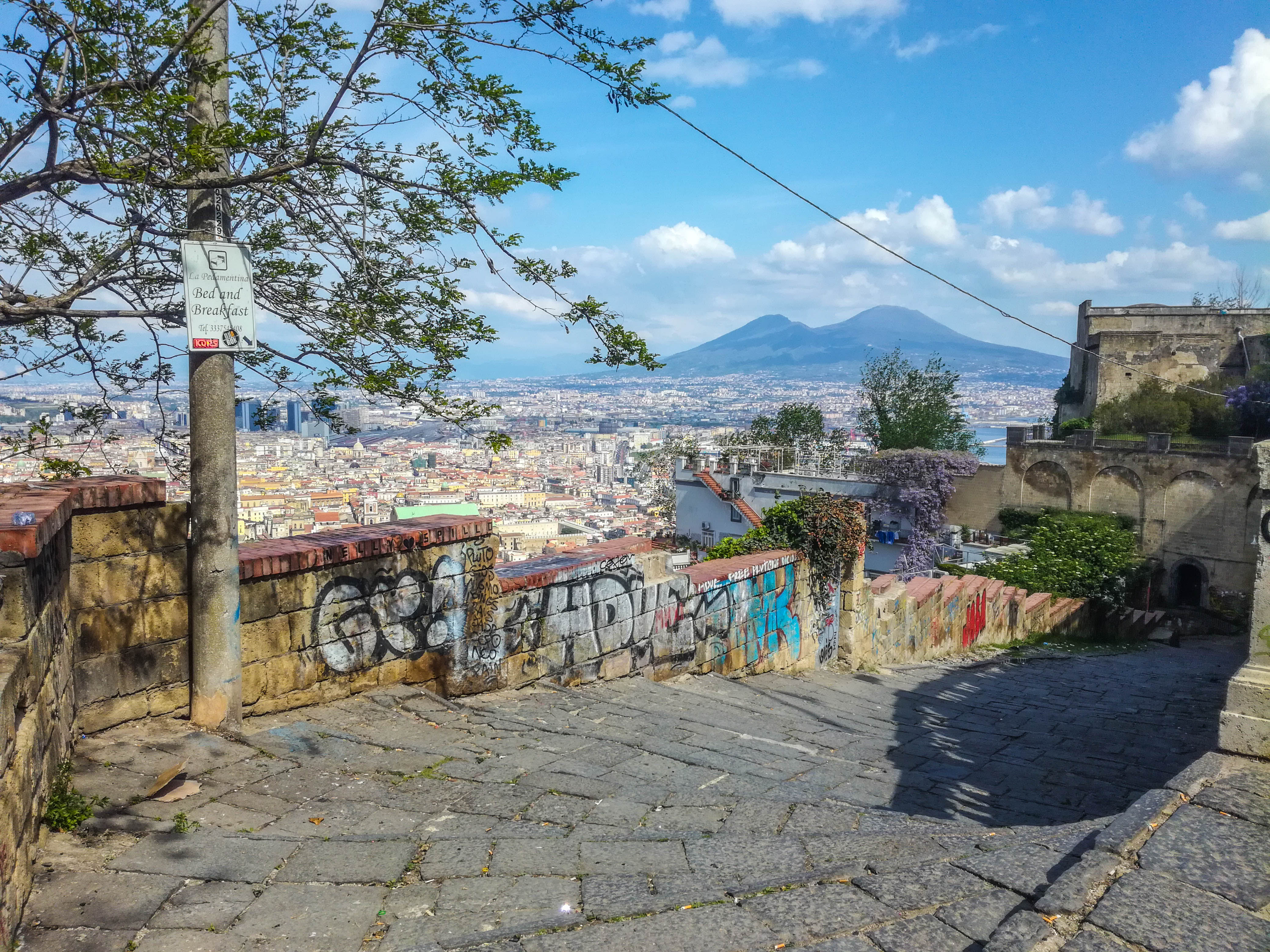
Pedamentina stairs.

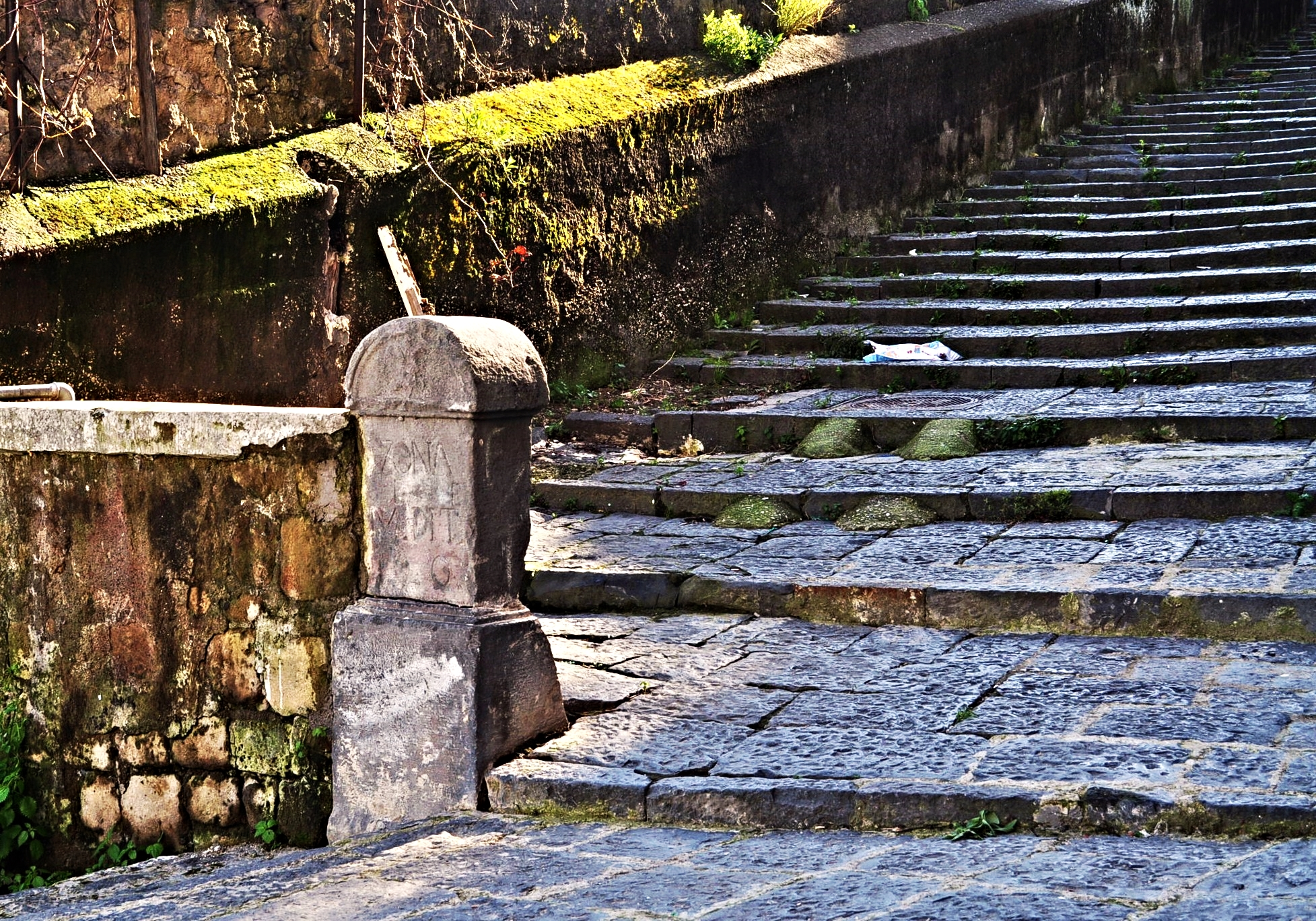
Pedamentina stairs.

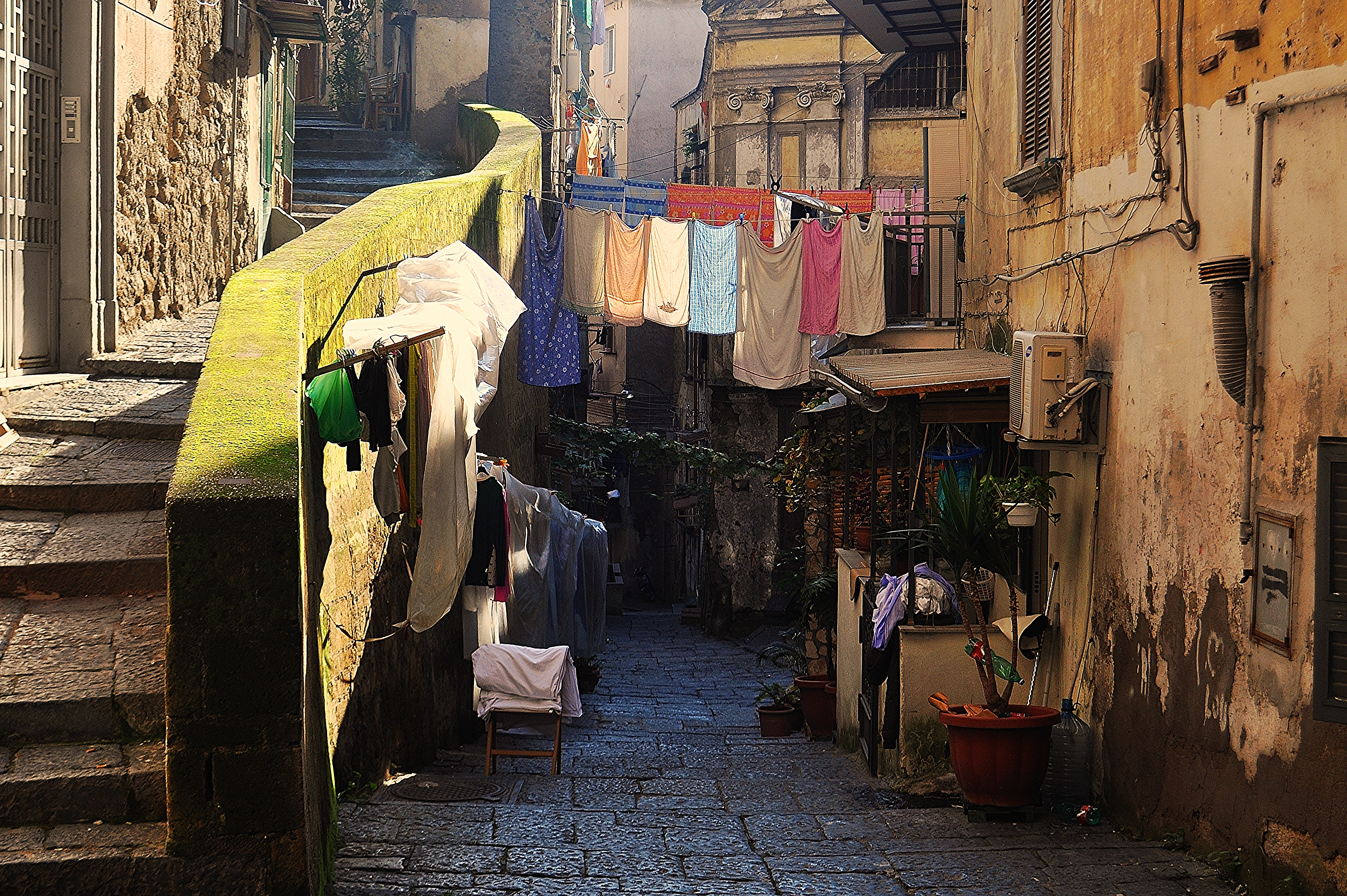
Sant'Antonio ai Monti stairs.

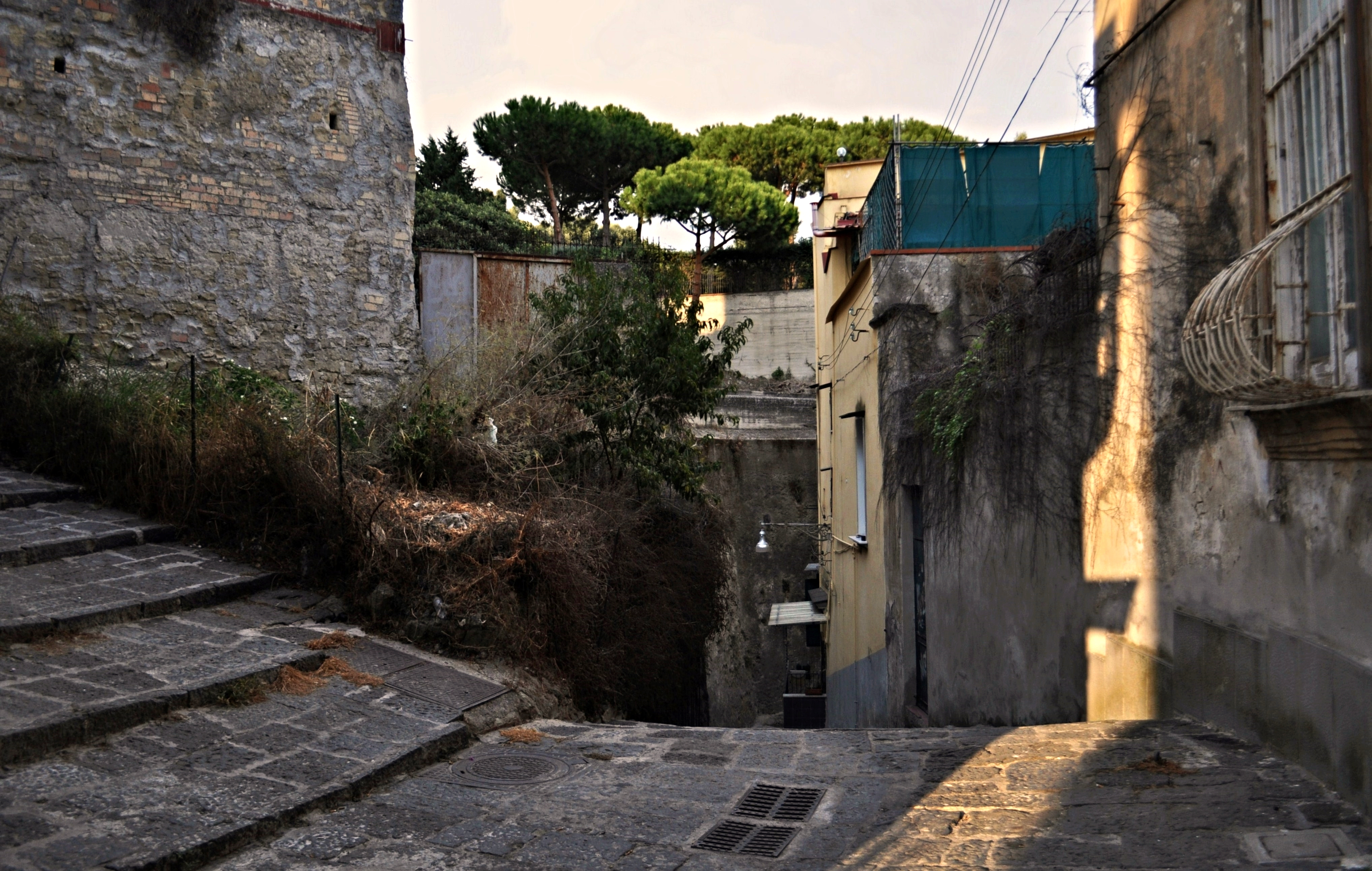
Petraio stairs.

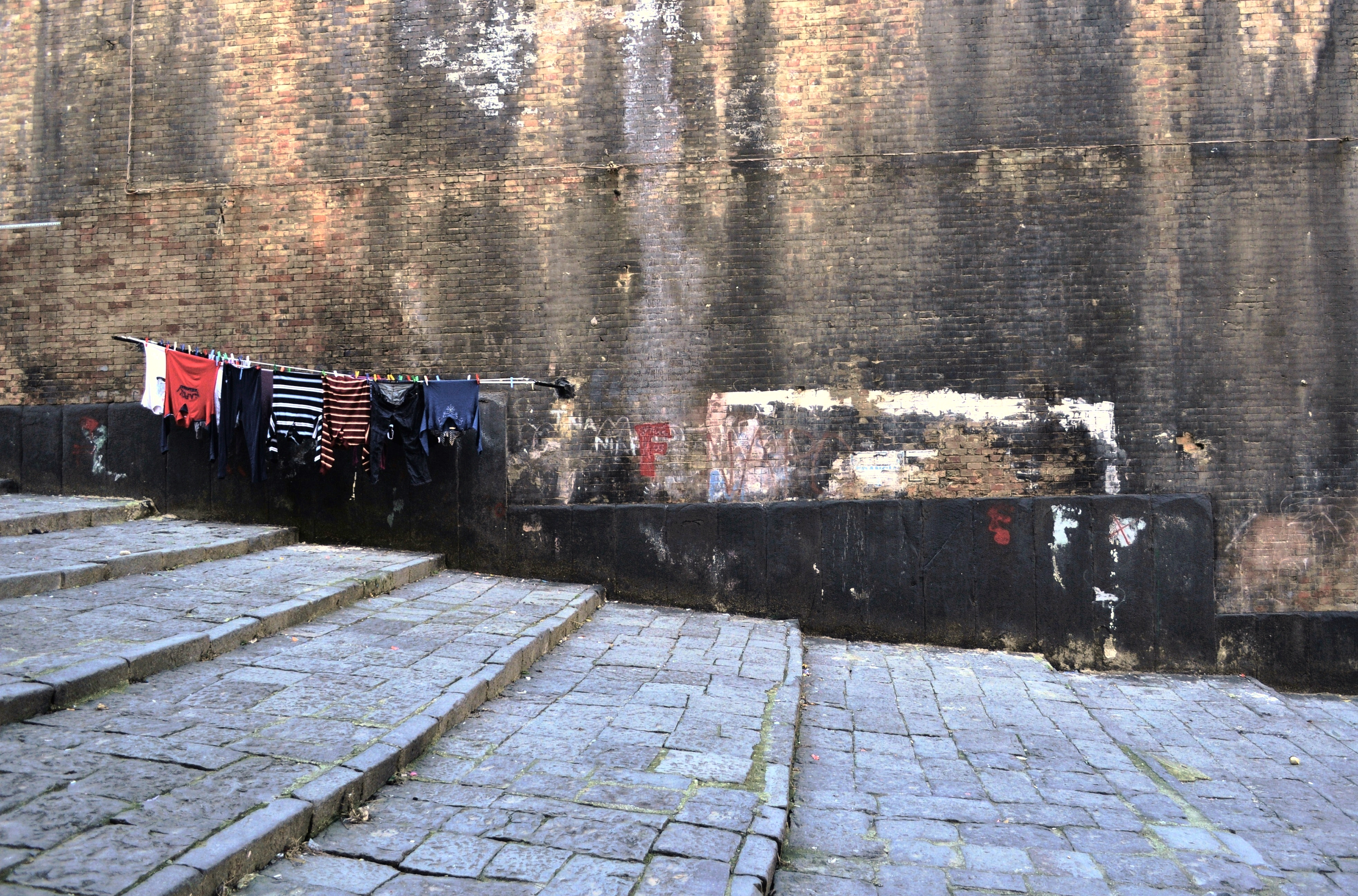
San Marcellino stairs.

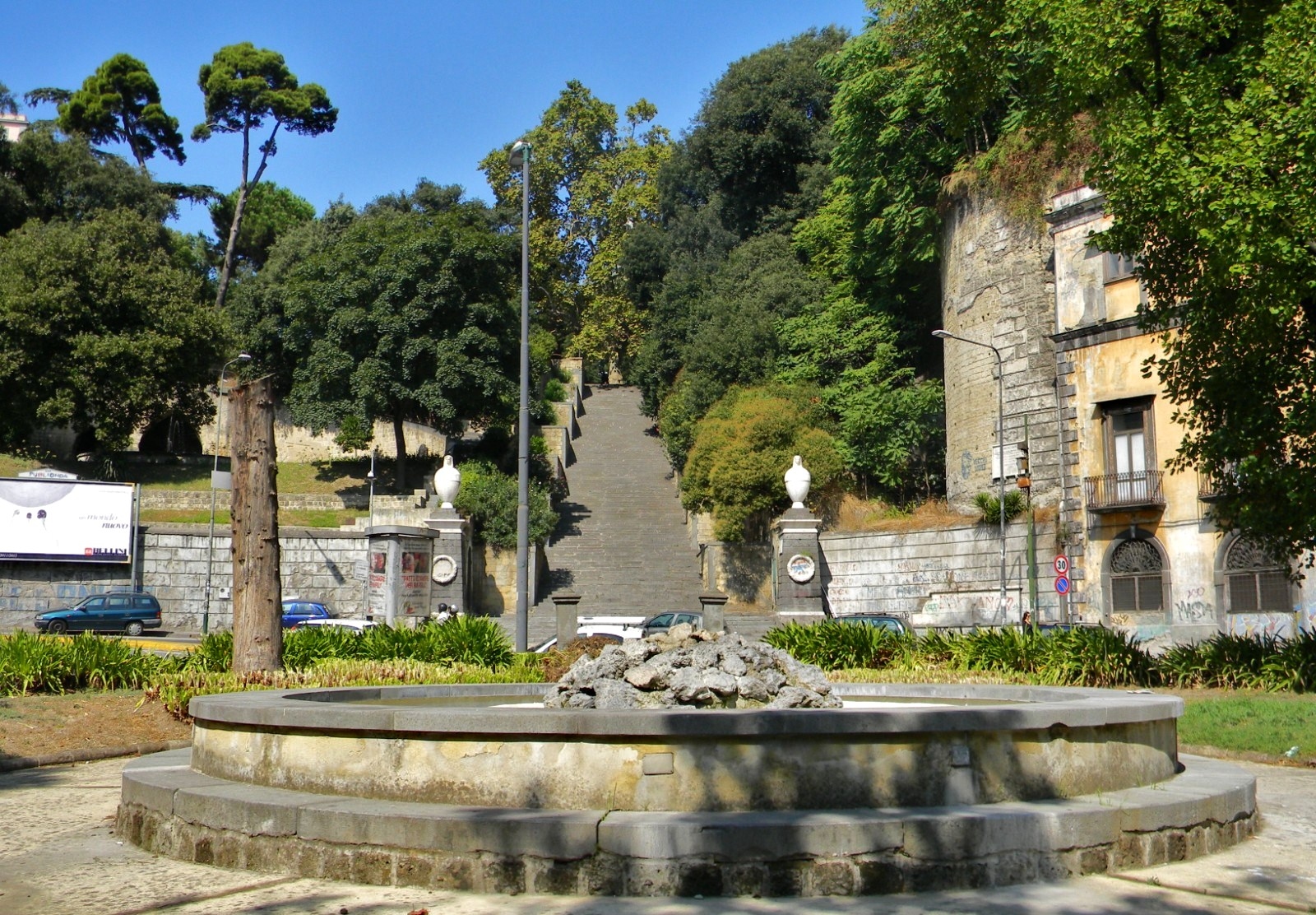
Capodimonte stairs.

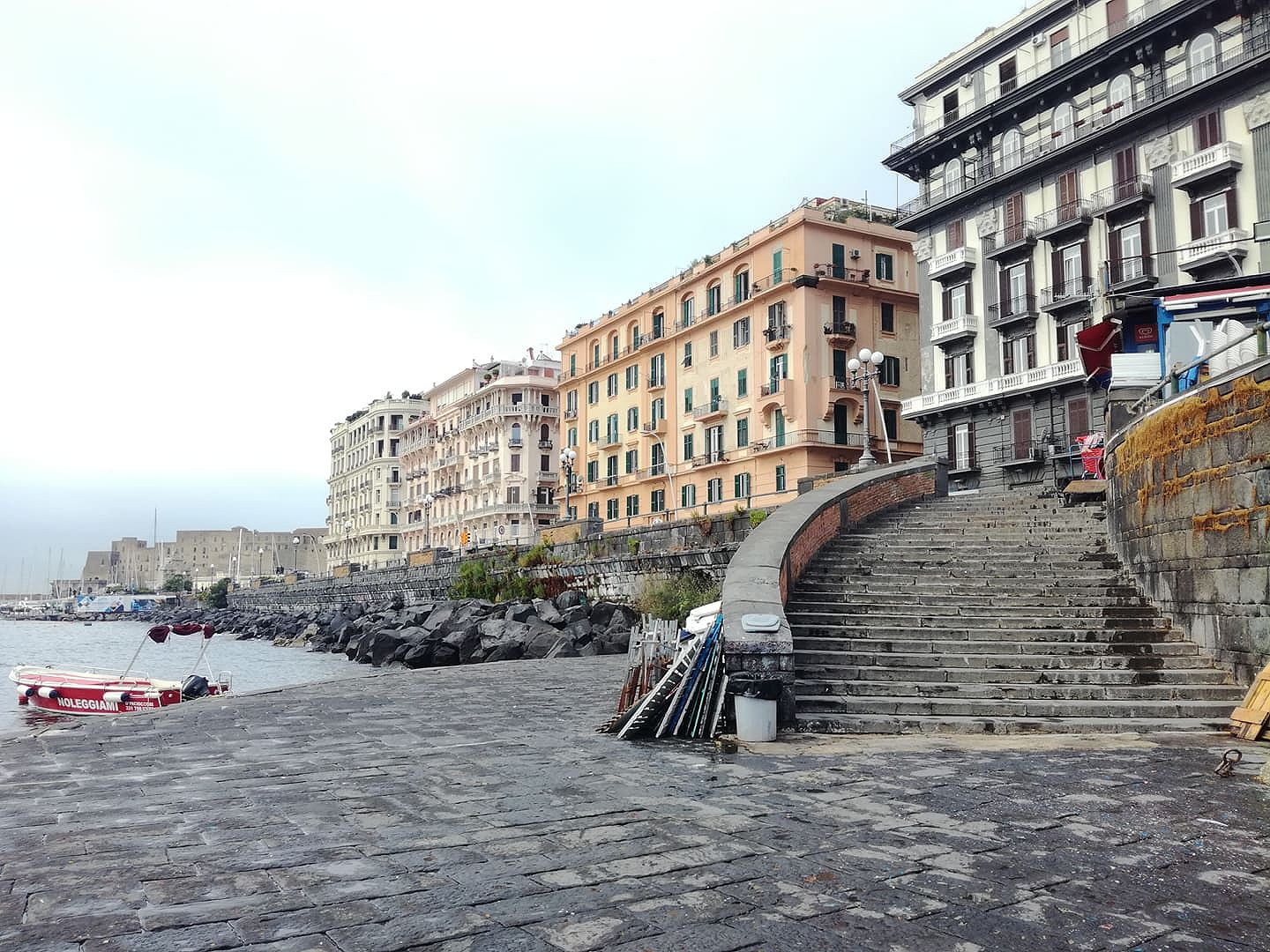
Nazario Sauro stairs.

The stairways of Naples are over 200 and are complex urban systems that connect various areas of the city comprising often narrow interconnected stone paths, walks, alleys, steps and ramps — varying in slopes and width, at points bifurcating or overarched by buildings. The history of these features is mainly due to expansions outside the walls of the sixteenth century.

== History ==
The stairways of Naples are ancient pedestrian paths that connect the hills with the center and the coast. The oldest graded paths of the city, most of the time, were born thanks to the coverage of streams or springs, which once flowed just outside the city.

These paths were also made to easily connect the various monumental, especially religious, emergencies: monasteries, retreats, churches, etc. or above all, for urban planning needs.

They are still the subject of study and are considered real urban masterpieces.

=== Main stairs ===
- Pedamentina di San Martino
- The Petraio
- Capodimonte stairs
- Santa Maria Apparente stairs
- Moiariello stairs
- Giuseppe Piazzi stairs
- Cacciottoli stairs
- San Francesco stairs
- Montesanto stairs
- Bernando Celentano stairs
- Cosma e Damiano stairs
- Paradiso stairs
- Santa Barbara stairs
- Cupa vecchia stairs
- Nazario Sauro stairs
- San Marcellino stairs
- Sant'Antonio ai Monti stairs
