= Dario Pinelli =

Italian guitarist

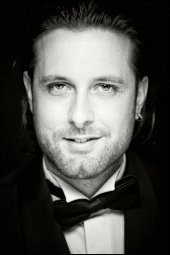
Dario Pinelli

Dario Pinelli (born March 27, 1982, in Manduria, Italy), is an Italian jazz manouche guitarist.

== Early life ==
Pinelli began studying the classical guitar at a very young age and began performing as a concertist in baroque music. Hereinafter, upon winning a scholarship by Jazz Music International, he transferred to New York where he began studying the jazz guitar. Later passing from classic jazz to typical European jazz, at which he dedicated himself to revamp and renew the style with new harmonic solutions, rhythms and melodies.

== Career ==
In 2010, Pinelli began a collaboration with BinarioSwing (Michele Biancofiore - rhythm guitar; Umberto Calentini - double bass; Teo Carriero - drums). The new group performed his music at "Metropolitan Room" in New York City and later, at the jazz hotspot, "Birdland" of New York. During their 2009 USA Tour, Dario Pinelli & BinarioSwing performed as guests invited by David Amram, 'father' of the Beat Generation, at the club "The Village Gate" (now known as "Le Poisson Rouge") in NYC.

His music has featured in "La Casa Sulle Nuvole" (film with Adriano Giannini, Warner 2009/Luce/Rai Cinema); ABC Australia - Classic Breakfast; The Poets Cafe Show - CTN, USA (conducted by Steve Luttrell); El Mundo del Jazz - Argentina (with Mr. Nano Herrera); Dimitry Shakin Show - Vladivostok, Russia;and others. Dario Pinelli & BinarioSwing started their world tour "You did it!" in 2012 including United States, France, Germany, Denmark, Russia, England, Japan, Australia, Morocco and other countries.

== Discography ==
- 1998 About Jazz,
- 2004 Jazz Guitar Solo
- 2007 The Godfathers, (TRJ)
- 2009 Just Wine About It!, (TRJ)
- 2010 La Casa Sulle Nuvole, (Warner Chappell)
- 2011 Black Deceit, (MoraMora)
- 2012 One by One, (MoraMora)
- 2013 Made for That, (MoraMora)
