= Rione Antignano =

Area of the Vomero district in Naples (Italy)

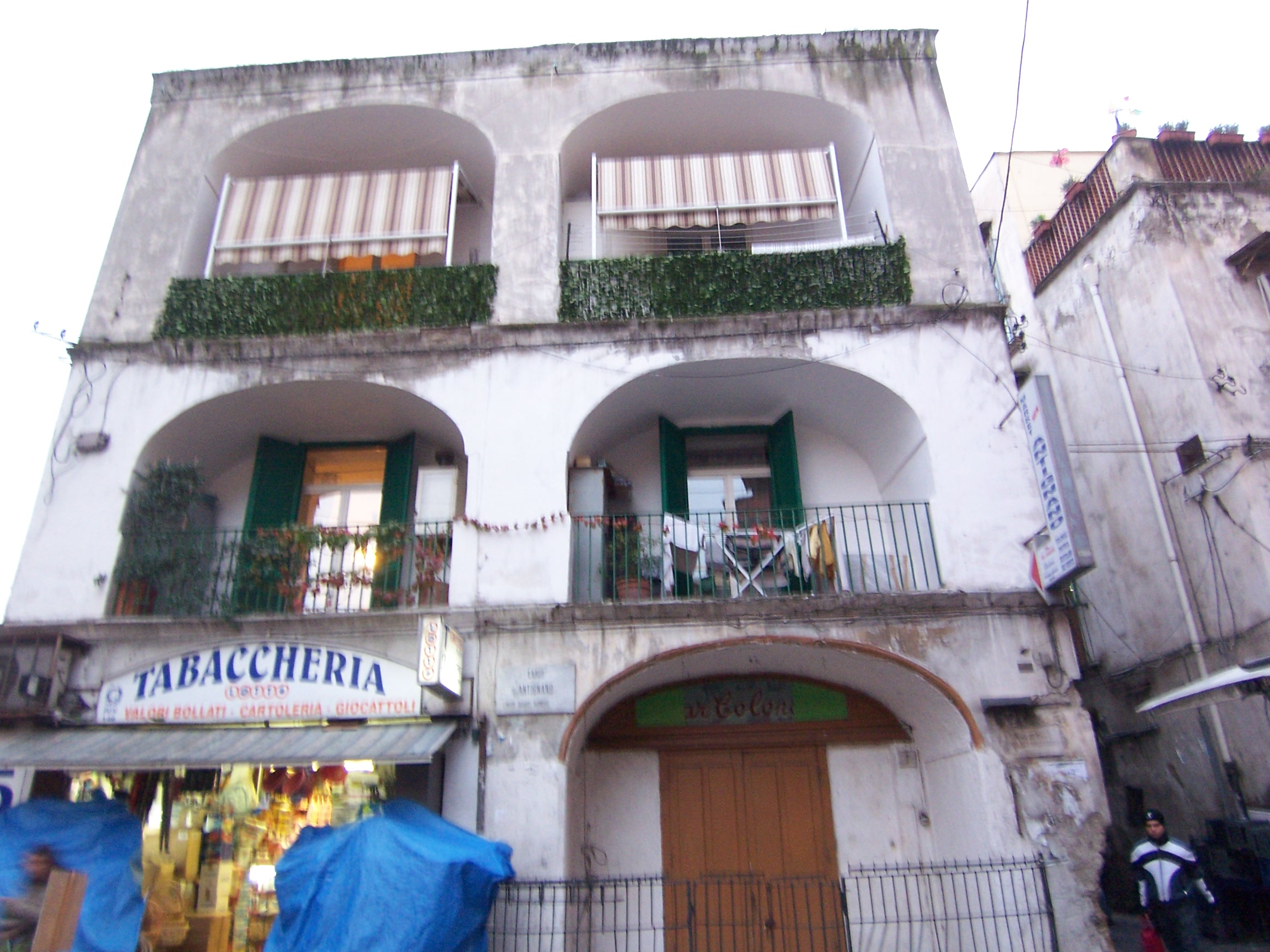
Structure in Antignano, Naples.

Rione Antignano is one of the oldest areas of the Vomero district in Naples; currently it extends along via Antignano, largo Antignano, vico Antignano, via Giuseppe Recco (formerly via Nuova Antignano), as well as the upper section of via Annella di Massimo, part of piazza degli Artisti and via San Gennaro in Antignano.

== Historical notes and descriptions ==
Antignano arose in Roman times as a simple rural settlement, on via Puteolis Neapolim per colles, the road which before the much later tunnels between Fuorigrotta and Mergellina had become the primary land crossing between the Phlegraean area and Naples proper.

Around the 2nd century AD the road was rearranged and called via Antiniana (either from ante Agnano as it faces the small lake of Agnano, which had dried up centuries previously, or from the adjective Antonianum, referring to a particular owner of the area). At the beginning of the Middle Ages, innumerable small agricultural settlements formed along the road and others that linked Naples to Nola, Atella, Capua and Cuma, which were called "casali".

Antignano had more than fifty farmhouses that surrounded Naples since the time of the Dukes, whose inhabitants came down to the city to sell agricultural products.

In the 15th century, Antignano was the home of the noble Capece family, including Scipione Capece, Lord of Antignano and of San Giovanni a Teduccio. Toward the end of the century, the poet Giovanni Pontano, minister of Ferrante I and of Alfonso II of Aragon, had a magnificent villa built in Amtignano with the famous horti, which he himself sang in his compositions.

The basilica of San Gennaro in Antignano on the homonymous street, dates to the early twentieth century, devoid of stylistic merit. Near the entrance to via della Cerra is a tiny aedicule with a marble effigy of the saint's head, taken from the pre-existing church erected in 1707, demolished in 1893 to make room for the current basilica, then built in 1904 on a project by Giuseppe Pisanti; this complex stands in the place where, traditionally, the miracle of the liquefaction of the blood of San Gennaro took place for the first time.

In the Bourbon period Antignano was a nerve center of the Dazio, of which the seat is still preserved, a small building with two arches on the side of which the inscription: "Here you pay for the census regj". Along the Via Arenella, which since the Middle Ages has connected the Vomero Vecchio, Antignano and the Arenella, has seen the great procession of the Risen Christ take place since the 17th century, also known as "the mystery of Antignano": a religious and folkloristic event, typical projection of the ancient medieval theater, perhaps introduced in the viceregal period.
