= Petraio =

Neighborhood and road in Naples, Italy

Location of the Petraio, within downtown Naples

Pensione Haase, Salita del Petraio

The Petraio is a lineal urban neighborhood and pedestrian road in Naples, Italy. It descends from what was once an expansive upper agricultural area (the present day hilltop district of Vomero) and connects adjacent neighborhoods to downtown Naples — terminating just outside the original perimeter walls of Naples, near the present day Chiaia district.

The path arose from an ancient self-formed alluvial channel that followed a natural and narrow watercourse, depositing rocks, stones and pebbles; meandering and bifurcating as it descended. As it became trafficked, inhabited and developed, the path was improved to connect a rustic series of paved stone gradini (steps), discese (descending steps), vici (alleys), largi (widenings), rampe (ramps) and salite (climbs) — varying in slope and width — and framed by buildings, churches, and small businesses.

As one of Naples' roughly more than 200 neighborhood stairs, inclined walks and ramps, the Petraio is accessible only on foot, and is noted for its range of architecture — from Neapolitan Liberty villas to bassi, small one and two room dwellings directly accessed off the Petraio itself — as well as its picturesque character and broad views of the city, the Gulf of Naples, Sorrento and the isle of Capri.

Originally, called il Imbrecciata (the debris-field) and later O'Petraro, the Petraio takes its name from the paths's original rocky character — the word stone translating to pietra in Italian and petra in Neapolitan.

== Access and sections ==
At its summit, the Petraio can be accessed by Via Annibale Caccavello in the San Martino section of Vomero, near Castel Sant'Elmo and the Montesanto Funicular — and at its lower terminus near the Chiaia area. Midpoints of the Petraio are served directly by the other funiculars of Vomero: via the Palazzolo-Parco Marcolini station of the Chiaia Funicular and the Petraio station of the Central Funicular. As well, the Petraio can be accessed by numerous cross-streets. It terminates at Naples' longest street, the prominent Corso Vittorio Emanuele.

From its lower terminus at the Corso V. Emanuele, the Petraio connects to the Chiaia neighborhood by a number of adjacent streets and loosely connects to the Monetesanto Stairs and the Gradoni Santa Maria Apparente.

- The upper Petraio terminus: 40°50′35.87″N 14°14′10.70″E
- .The lower Petraio terminus:40°50′22.69″N 14°14′25.76″E

Prominent sub-sections include:

- Gradini (steps) del Petraio
- Discesa (descending steps) del Petraio
- Vico (alley) del Petraio
- Largo (widening) del Petraio
- Rampe (ramp) del Petraio
- Salita (climb) del Petraio

== Paul Klee ==
On his 1901-1902 soujourn in Italy, noted Swiss-born painter Paul Klee stayed at Pensione Haase (Salita del Petrajo, Villa De Rosa 48, Pensione Haase, Naples), a Villa directly adjacent to the Petraio. In his diaries, he compared Genoa and Naples:

"It is already impossible for me to even enumerate what I have seen. Compared to Genoa, Naples is indolent, messy and sick. Compared to Naples, Genoa is one-sided. Naples has the greatest splendor alongside the greatest misery. Port life, carriage ride, high-level opera house, even a piece of Rome: the National Museum. Beside this the heavenly nature, unmatched. The sea of Genoa more imposing, but also more monotonous. Here (Naples) a placid cove, framed by strange mountains and closed by characteristic islands. And all I can see from the balcony of my room. Like a giant amphitheater, the wonderful city with its intense buzz lies at my feet. On the left the old city with the docks of the port and the ancient Vesuvius, on the right the modern Villa Nazionale and Posillipo. All around the house there are gardens of fresh green, fantastic shapes and myriads of flowers. Salita del Petraio, Villa De Rosa 48, Pensione Haase, Naples, is called this fabulous panoramic lookout. The sea is wonderfully blue and calm. The city is a lively picture of clarity, facades of blocks of houses, in the light and darkness, white streets, sections of dark green parks. Faced with such a spectacle one thinks of the temptation of Christ. We are exalted by joy, we are hovering between shining spheres, which have become the center of a world."

== In popular culture ==
- In the film The Four Days of Naples, in the early stages of the Neapolitan uprising, a young man can be heard shouting: "Pe 'e criatur' ro Petraio!".
- Popularly, the expression salirè 'ncoppo' is used in Santarèlla, which indicates the need to go from the Petraio to Villa La Santarella and Piazza Vanvitelli.
- Author Nicola Pugliese in his book Malacqua, cites Petraio, describing the origin of its name.

== See also ==
- Stairways in Naples
- Matera
