= Vomero =

Borough of Naples, Italy

- Quarter of Naples
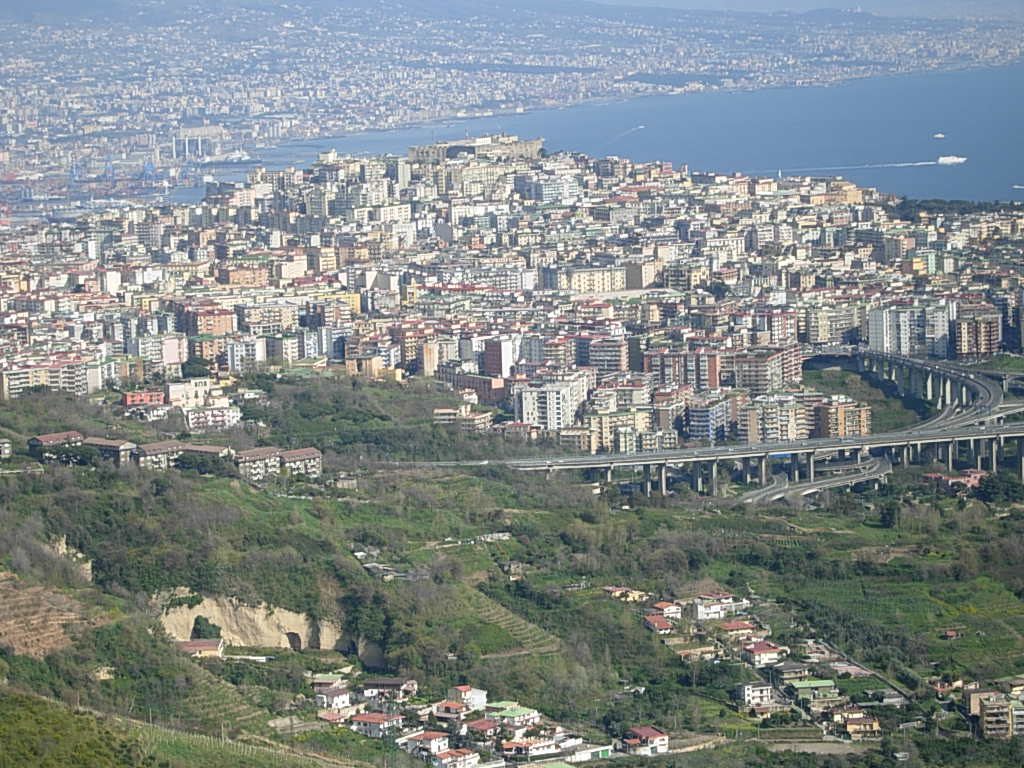
- Aerial photo of Vomero.

- Location of Vomero within Naples
- Country: Italy
- Region: Campania
- City: Naples
- Municipalità: 5th

Area
  - Total: 2.17 km^{2} (0.84 sq mi)

Population
  - Total: 44,791
  - Density: 20,600/km^{2} (53,500/sq mi)
- Postal codes: 80127, 80128 and 80129

Vomero (pronounced [ˈvɔːmero]; Neapolitan: Vommero) is a hilltop quarter of Naples, Italy — comprising approximately two square kilometres (0.77 sq mi) and a population of 48,000.

Vomero is noted for its central square, Piazza Vanvitelli; the ancient Petraio, its earliest path up and down to the original city of Naples; its ancient district of Rione Antignano; Floridiana Park and Villa Floridiana; the medieval fortress, Castel Sant'Elmo; three funiculars connecting to downtown historic districts; its active pedestrian zone (ZTL) — and its prominent location overlooking greater Naples, Mount Vesuvius, the Bay of Naples and the Tyrrhenian Sea.

Adjacent to the Arenella, Soccavo, Fuorigrotta, Chiaia, Montecalvario and Avvocata districts, the street and placenames within Vomero are typically named after noted artists, painters, sculptors, musicians, composers or architects, each with a prominent Neopolitan connection at the time of Vomero's development.

Residents go by the demonym, Vomeresi.

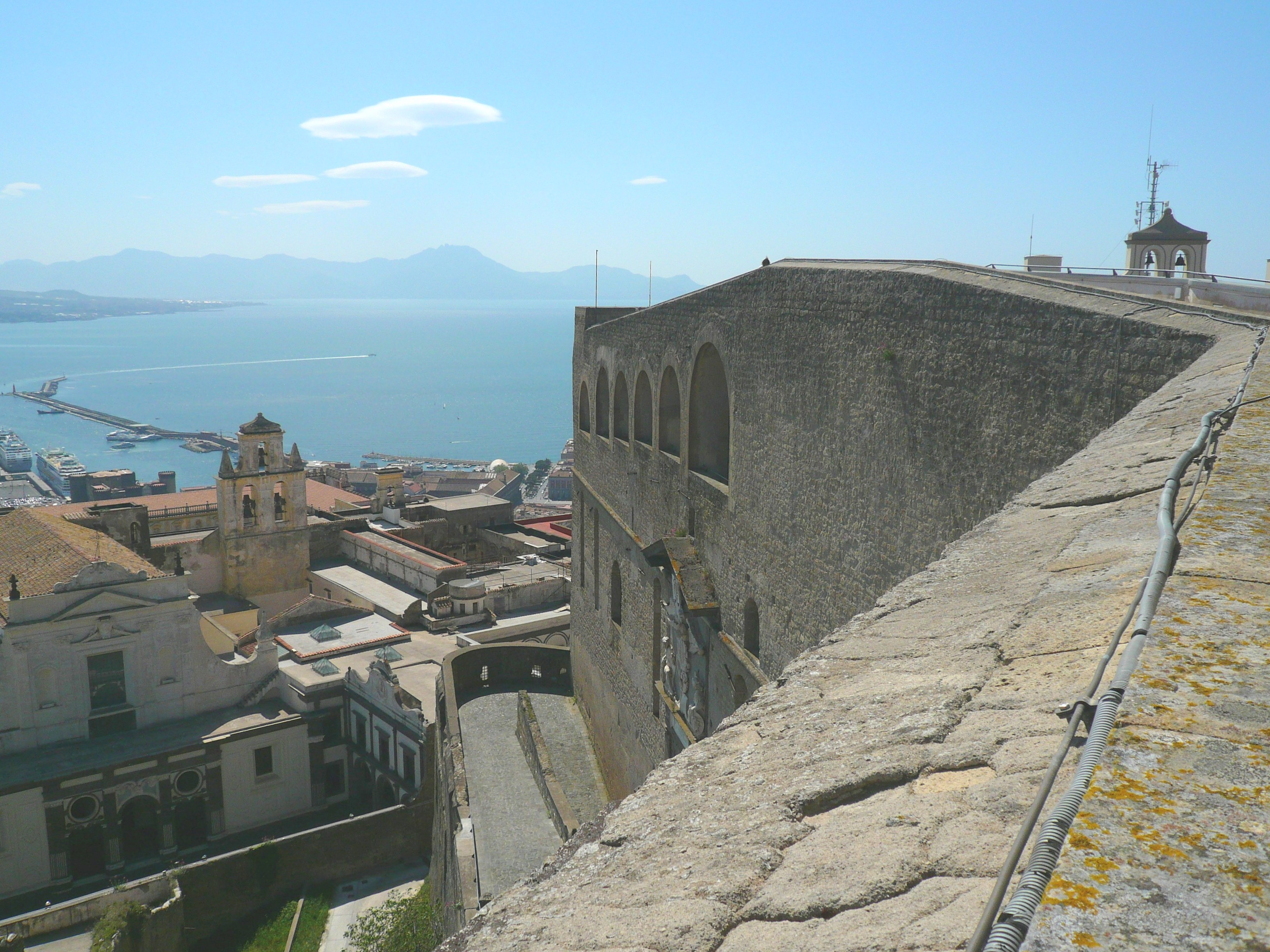
Aerial photo from Sant'Elmo fortress.

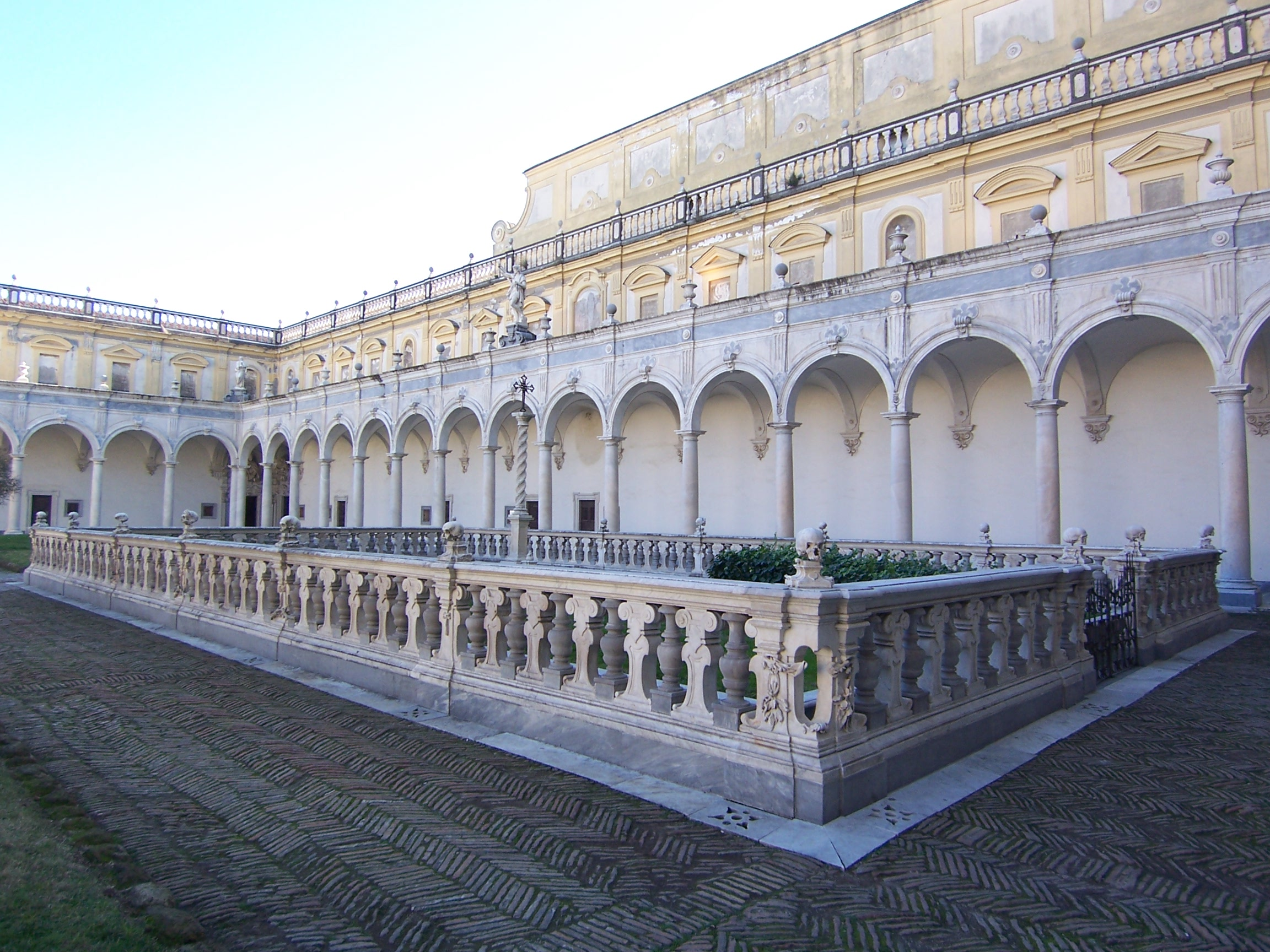
St. Martin's cloisters, 14th century.

== Etymology of Vomero ==
During the very earliest period, when Greek settlements were established in the Naples area in the second millennium BC, the Vomerese hill was called Bomòs (βωμός, or "high ground"). By the sixteenth century the name Vomero was used, possibly a corruption of the Greek Bomòs.

In Roman times, the hilltop area was called Paturcium, from Patulcius, a name related to Giano, the god to whom the hill was dedicated. In the early Middle Ages, via linguistic corruption, this became Patruscolo or Patruscio.

The name Vomero took hold at the end of the sixteenth century, deriving from the area's agricultural history – and initially referring to a historic farmhouse located on the hill, rather than the hill itself.

Notably, the word vomere, is used to describe a ploughshare (the blade of a plough) and was the name of agricultural game, the winner being the plowman who could trace the straightest furrow.

The hilltop's agricultural activity earned it various nicknames, including Broccoli Hill, il Quartiere dei Broccoli and Collina dei Broccoli.

== Transit ==
To access Vomero, residents and visitors use an array of well-traveled vehicular streets and roundabouts; a system of subway, bus, funicular and metro line; and an extensive pedestrian network that includes escalators, historic stairs and paths, and a modern pedestrian zone.

The Petraio The oldest access to Vomero remains intact today: an extensive network of pedestrian stairs and paths from the city's original neighborhoods below. One of the most notable of these paths is the historic Petraio, which arose from an ancient meandering watercourse — ultimately to be improved, inhabited and connected by a series of rustic steps, alleys and ramps — varying in slope and width — and framed by buildings, churches, and small businesses.

Funiculars As development expanded between 1800 and 1900, the municipality constructed three funiculars, railways each with two counterbalanced passenger cabs attached at opposite ends of a cable system, the two cabs ascending in descending in concert between their upper and lower stations. The stations of the Chiaia, Montesanto and Central Funicular are closely located in Vomero and connect to three radially-distant lower stations across the Naples downtown.

Metro Since 1980, Vomero has been served by Line 1 of the Naples Metro, specifically at Quattro Giornate and Piazza Vanvitelli stations.

ZTL Augmenting the neighborhood sidewalks and prioritizing pedestrian movement, Vomero inaugurated an active Limited Traffic Zone (ZTL) in 1994, connecting Piazza Vanvitelli, via Cimarosa and via Alessandro Scarlatti. In 2008, the zone incorporated via Luca Giordano, linking upper and lower Vomero, the San Martino area, via Cilea, via Belvedere and the oldest area of Vomero, Antignano.

Escalators Three urban, outdoor escalators help compensate for Vomero's hilly terrain, connecting Piazza Fuga to Via Morghen and connecting the upper end of Via Scarlatti to two higher intermediate small piazzas (piazzettas) on the way to the upper station of the Montesanto Funicular and the prominent tourist destinations, Castel Sant'Elmo and the Certosa di San Martino.

Vehicular access Vehicular access to Vomero is served directly by Exit 9 of the Autostrada A56, commonly known as the Tangenziale di Napoli (Naples Bypass or simply the Tange). The exit accesses via Cilea and via Caldieri as well as via Pigna junctions, the latter which leads to the neighboring districts of Soccavo and Arenella. Car, truck, motorcycle and scooter traffic to Vomero is also accessible via numerous streets connecting to adjacent neighborhoods. Numerous bus lines connect Vomero to greater Naples.

== History ==
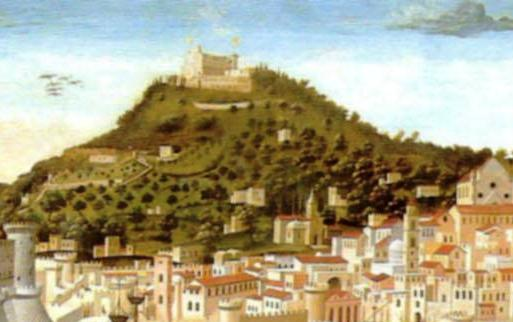
Il Vomero (particolare della Tavola Strozzi, 1474)

Until the end of the nineteenth century, Vomero was a largely uninhabited area, relatively distant from the city of Naples. Its oldest area, around present day Antignano, consisted of scattered rural dwellings and villages remaining from Roman settlements, near what was a relatively important road. Before underground tunnels connected Fuorigrotta and Mergellina, (Galleria Laziale and Galleria Quattro Giornate), the hill road known as Via Puteolis (Pozzouli) Neapolim per colles crossed what is now the Vomero ridge as the primary connection between the Phlegraean area (e.g., Pozzouli) to the west and the city of Naples, proper. Around the 2nd century AD the street was reconfigured and renamed via Antiniana, giving name to the Antignano district, where the Miracle of San Gennaro is said to have taken place for the first time, between 413 and 431 AD.

After subsequent Norman and Swabian domination, with the Angevins, Naples in 1266 became the capital of the Kingdom of Naples, remaining the capital until the Italian Unification in 1860. During this period, development began to move uphill for strategic reasons, toward present day Vomero. The area began to populate after the construction a Carthusian Cloister, the Certosa di San Martino, in 1325. Around this time, the Angevins replaced the ancient Norman watchtower near the cloister, with the Castle of Belforte, what ultimately expanded to become Castel Sant'Elmo. The adjacent areas remained largely rural.

Under the Aragonese and subsequently the Spanish, Naples experienced a rapid population increase, due to immigration from the Iberian peninsula and the remaining kingdom. The need to enlarge the city, led Viceroy Pedro Álvarez de Toledo to direct the development of Naples outside its then current boundaries in the flattest area of the city, the present day Centro Storico. Development up the adjacent unsettled hillsides was encouraged. Laws, first in 1556, forbid construction of new buildings immediately around Castel Sant'Elmo — and, in 1583, on the adjacent hillsides.

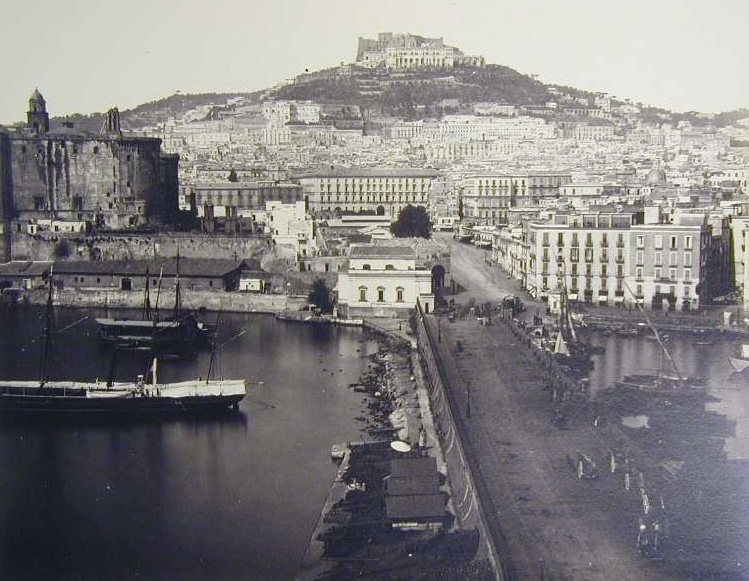
Vomero in a photo by Giorgio Sommer of 1860–70 circa

In the period of the Viceroys following Don Pedro, the building expansion followed, leading innumerable villages and hamlets to merge. Construction on Vomero hill first appeared on maps with the seventeenth century.

During the Naples Plague of 1656, Naples nobility and clergy sought refuge, with the aristocracy establishing second homes in what would become Vomero, a trend that continued during the eighteenth century, especially after development of via Salvator Rosa (the "Infrascata street"). Noble families settling in Vomero included the Carafa, the Counts of Acerra, the Ruffo di Sicilia, the Cacciottoli, the Cangiani.

In 1809, a new administrative division of the city of Naples was formed, operated by Joachim Murat, whereby the villages of Vomero became part of the city proper, in the district of the Avvocata. Toward the middle of the 19th century, Ferdinando II commissioned Corso Maria Teresa (renamed Corso Vittorio Emanuele after 1860), establishing the effective lower border of Vomero.

In 1817, Vomero's noble residents were joined by royalty, when Ferdinand I of Bourbon acquired the future Villa Floridiana.

This district called the Vomere is rich in monasteries and beautiful little houses to be the healthy air having an aspect to the sea (Questa contrada detta il Vomere è ricca di monasteri e di bellissime casine per essere l'aria salutifera avendo un aspetto al mare)

— Carlo Celano

=== Founding and urbanization ===
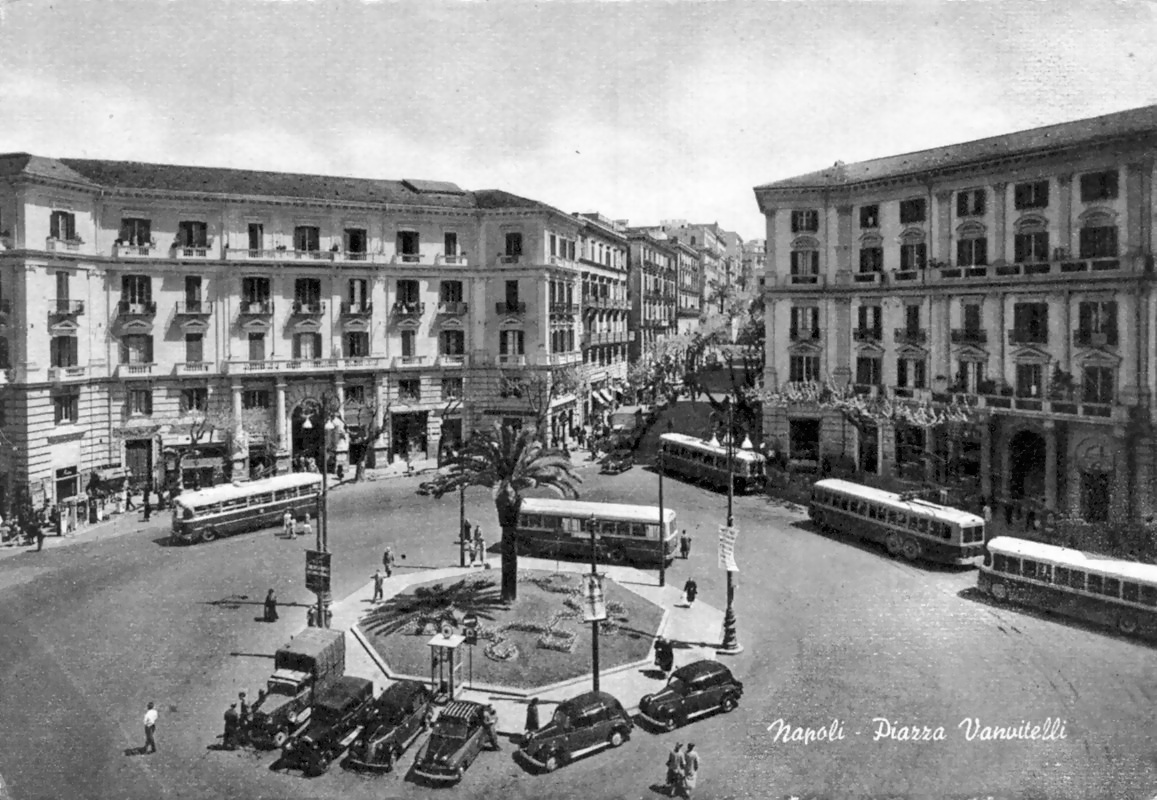
Piazza Vanvitelli in the fifties

Vomero residential development began in earnest in 1885, with the district's official founding (under the law "for the Restoration of Naples") and development of its rectilineal street pattern, punctuated by roundabouts — using a common European urban approach, informed by Baron Haussmann's Paris and the Roman districts of Esquilino and Testaccio. The neighborhood was conceived as an upper-middle class residential neighborhood with large villas and residential buildings, often in late Liberty style, starting near the Villa Floridiana and the area around Castel Sant'Elmo and the San Martino Certosa. The neighborhood would change distinctly in the mid-20th century.

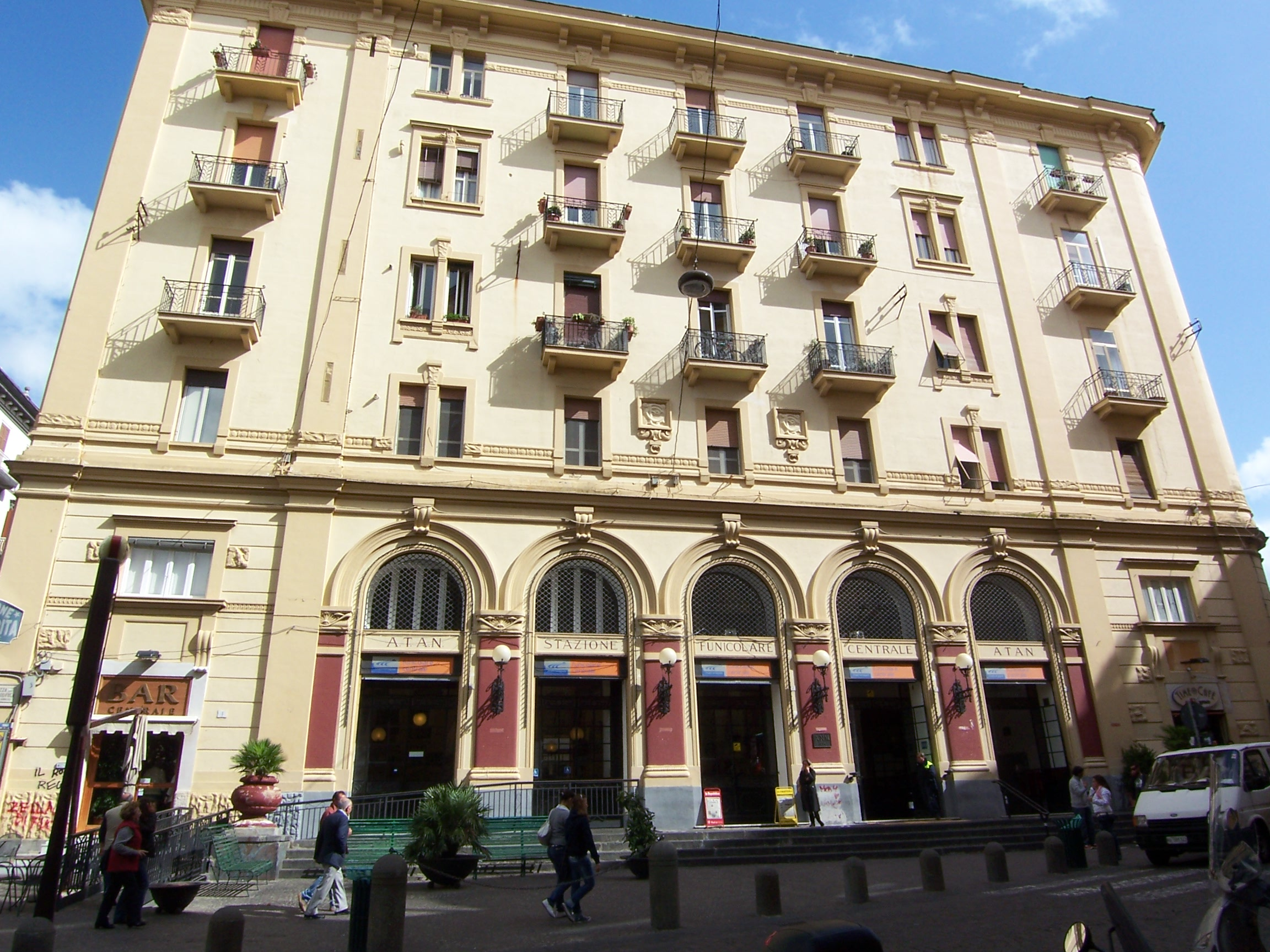
Upper station of the Central Funicular, in Piazza Fuga

In addition, before the law on recovery, a Piedmontese bank, the Banca Tiberina, had purchased land at the Vomero between San Martino, via Belvedere and Antignano, with the intention of building a new neighborhood (Garibaldi had already thought of this to the hilly areas as potential new wards, where, however, he believed the proletariat should be hosted) The laying of the foundation stone by the sovereigns took place on 11 May 1885 and, on 20 October 1889, the new district was inaugurated, with the opening of the Funicular of Chiaia, followed by the Funicolare di Montesanto in 1891.

Until that date, but still for several decades later, life and therefore the history of the Vomerese hill and that of the city of Naples evolved separately. "I go to Naples", "I go down to Naples" were the sentences of the vomeresi to indicate the journey to the center of the city. But, after 11 May 1885, the Vomero slowly began to settle territorially with the city.

The first example of "urban" buildings was the "Four Palaces" in Piazza Vanvitelli, built at the beginning of the 20th century by Banca Tiberina. After the beginning of the works, however, the scarce reactivity of the market (due to the economic difficulties of the time and the still difficult connections between the city and the hill) pushed the bank (owner of the built-up areas and of the two funiculars) to yield in the 1899 its rights to the Bank of Italy. This caused the suspension for several years of the works envisaged by the urbanization plan (the result of the agreement signed between the Municipality and Banca Tiberina). At the beginning of the twentieth century, only a part of the buildings in the center of the Vomero (between Piazza Vanvitelli, along Via Scarlatti and Via Morghen) were made (in addition to the layout of the subdivision). All the new buildings were in neo-Renaissance style, which in Naples will last until the first three decades of the twentieth century, dragging the projects of the late nineteenth century through the years.

The Bank of Italy, to recover the capital invested, decided to sell the buildings already built and the land, and split the blocks into smaller lots that could be more easily sold. Consequently, in the early years of the twentieth century there was no impetuous urban development, but less intensive construction of small, two-storey and small-scale villas was built, surrounded by pretty gardens; which, moreover, had the ability to better enhance the landscape aspects of the places, compared to the large Umbertine buildings. The architectural taste that characterized the period, up until the mid-twenties, was that defined liberty together with the so-called neo-eclectic.

The construction of small lots, which began at the beginning of the century, continued even after the first world war and continued to attract a new social class, able to acquire single-family homes or for a few families, formed mainly by professionals, entrepreneurs, people anyway wealthy who, with their needs and their way of life, defined the character of the new neighborhood, where in this period life began to take its habits, revolving around Piazza Vanvitelli, the funiculars, the axes of via Scarlatti and via Luca Giordano. [...] The development of the areas of via Aniello Falcone, via Palizzi, the "Santarella" continued; large prestigious schools opened (the "Vanvitelli", the "Sannazaro"), elite places of leisure, such as the "Diana" theater, inaugurated in 1933 by Prince Umberto, cinemas, restaurants, cafes [...]; clean and efficient clinics, the elegant early Christian basilica style church of San Gennaro, the new sports center of Littorio, elegant shops. The artists were not counted then. The Vomero of this period is what is described with regret in the books that recall it, the one that created the myth in the collective imagination, that of nostalgia, the "Vomero disappeared", the "Paradise Lost", that of a unique reality and unrepeatable

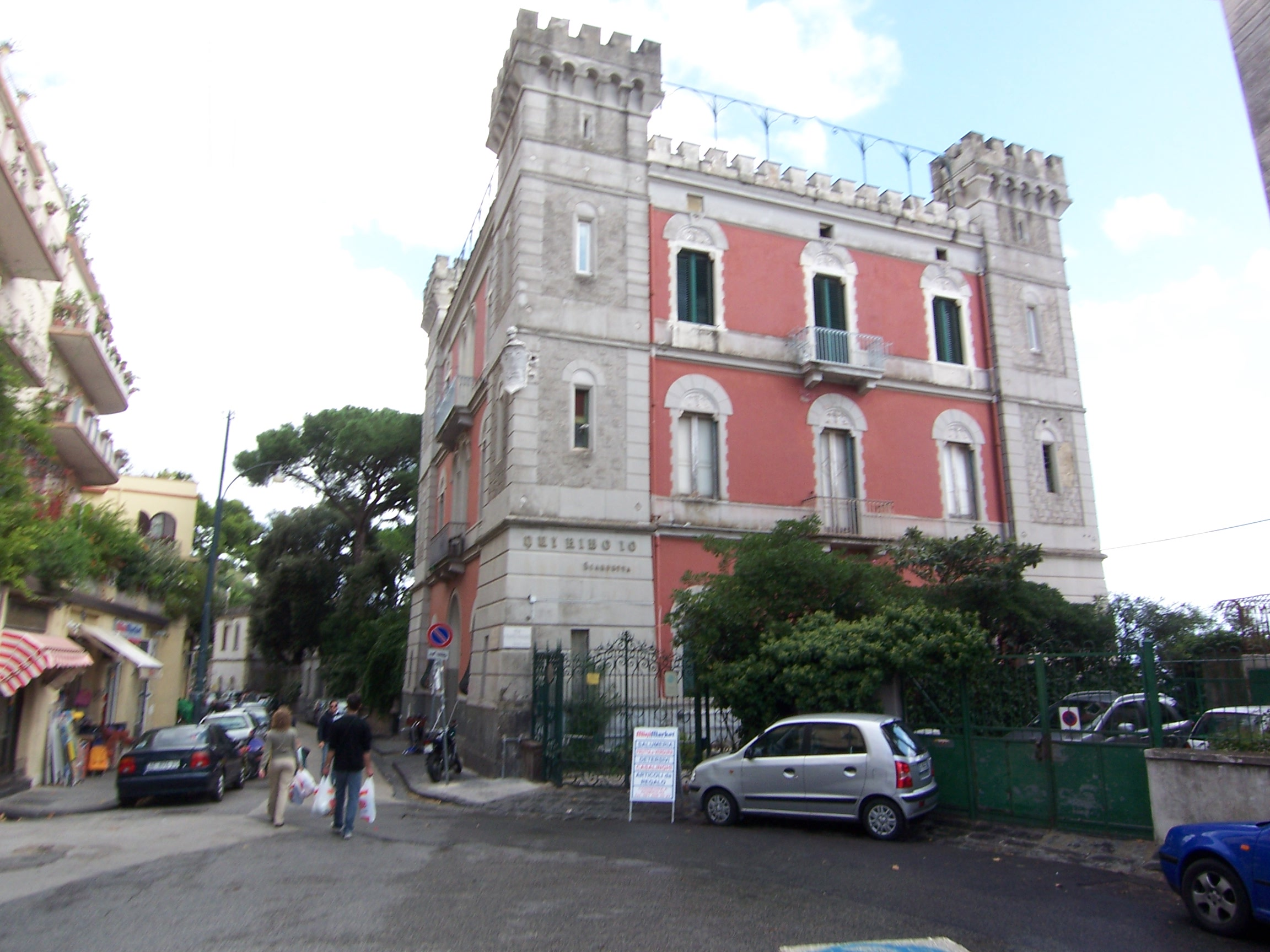
Villa La Santarella by Eduardo Scarpetta

The opening of the new Central Funicular (Funiculare Centrale), in 1928, facilitating the movement between the Vomero and the center, led to a significant increase in urbanization, which again turned towards the large buildings, also built according to the various styles then in fashion (from the liberty to neo-eclecticism, to the first rationalism). The new inhabited center expanded to reach the ancient villages (Vomero Vecchio, Antignano), incorporating them.

=== Four Days of Naples ===
Vomero played a crucial role in the Four Days of Naples (27–30 September 1943), the critical juncture in World War II when the people of Naples began resisting the Germans, marking a turning point in the war.

Resistance and clashes against the German occupiers were first recorded in Vomero near the Pagliarone farm on Via Belvedere, when armed citizens stopped a car, killing its driver, a German marshal. Subsequently, at a cross street between Via Scarlatti and Via Cimarosa, a German motorcar was overturned — causing the death of the two occupants, in turn leading to a German retaliation. After learning of the death of a Neopolitan sailor, shot with a pistol by a Nazi soldier, unrest erupted in various locations around Vomero, including at Piazza Vanvitelli, where a dozen young Vomeresi left a bar and attacked three German soldiers.

At what is now Piazza Quattro Giornate (then Piazza Mascagni, the square at Littorio Stadium), Germans had been using the stadium to imprison roughly 8,000 captured insurgent civilians. A group of Vomeresi, organized by a retired teacher, Antonio Tarsia, as well as a military group commanded by Lieutenant Enzo Stimolo, mobilized to surround the site and free the captives. Roughly 200 civilians and 50 military reinforcements attacked the stadium relentlessly, raining machine gun fire from atop surrounding buildings for hours. Realizing they were trapped and outnumbered, the Germans surrendered. Negotiations later began at the German command center on Corso Vittorio Emanuele.

The previous night the armory of Castel Sant'Elmo had fallen, not without bloodshed. Germans, stationed at Villa Floridiana, intervened in force to give battle.

The Sannazaro High School became a meeting and coordination place for the Resistance, where Professor Antonio Tarsia in the Curia declared himself head of the insurgents on 30 September 1943, assuming full civil and military powers.

Today in Vomero, in addition to numerous prominently sites marking the events (e.g., Piazza Quattro Giornale, Quattro Giornale station of Metro Line 1, The Medaglie d'Oro traffic circle) three memorial plaques mark the events: on the facade of the Liceo Sannazaro; next to the entrance of the Carabinieri barracks in Piazza Quattro Giornate; and perhaps most importantly, on Via Belvedere in front of the ancient main entrance of the Pagliarone farm, where the initial resistance occurred.

=== World War II to today ===
Housing demand and building speculation, after World War II and especially during the sixties, replaced the sober and elegant architecture of the Vomero area with tall, mostly reinforced concrete buildings. With the elimination of most gardens and green areas, and destruction of many of Vomero's Art Nouveau villas and Umbertine buildings, Vomero became a middle-class neighborhood, incorporating Arenella and pushing toward Camaldoli hill. Difficult resolutions included the infamous Chinese Wall of Mario Ottieri on Via Aniello Falcone, and the buildings on Via Caldieri.

The district still retains many examples of the original architecture, a heritage for all Italian architecture including historical buildings, such as some of the oldest noble villas (Villa del Pontano, Villa Belvedere, Villa Regina, Villa Lucia, Villa Haas, Villa Presenzano or Diaz, Villa Ricciardi, Villa Leonetti, Villa Salve) an ancient Bourbon duty building, in the Antignano district.

Between the Corso Vittorio Emanuele and the gardens of the Certosa di San Martino there is the Vigna San Martino extant for over six centuries.

== Notable Vomero ==
=== Monuments, museums, historic sites ===
- Castel Sant'Elmo (houses the museum of the 20th century)
- Certosa e Museo di San Martino
- Villa Floridiana and the Duca di Martina National Museum of Ceramics
- Chiesa di San Gennaro ad Antignano
- Chiesa di San Gennaro al Vomero
- Chiesa di San Gennariello al Vomero
- Chiesa del Sacro Cuore dei Salesiani
- Chiesa di San Francesco d'Assisi al Vomero
- Chiesa di Maria SS. del Buon Consiglio
- Chiesa di Santa Maria della Libera
- Chiesa della Madonna della Luce
- Chiesa dell'Architiello

=== Film industry ===
In the early twentieth century, some of the first Italian film production houses were born at Vomero. The first in the city was the Partenope Film (originally Fratelli Troncone & C.), of Guglielmo, Vincenzo and Roberto Troncone, who, born in 1906, was active for about twenty years, with headquarters and theaters in via Solimena.

In 1915 the Polifilms of Giuseppe Di Luggo was officially founded. The company, founded in 1912 as a film distribution company with the name De Luggo & C., was transformed in 1914 into a film factory, originally called Napoli Film, with headquarters and theater in via Cimarosa.

In 1919 the Polifilms in economic difficulties ceded its installations and theaters of installation to Gustavo Lombardo, already owner of the distribution company SIGLA (Italian Society Gustavo Lombardo Anonima), which gave life to Lombardo Film, the future Titanus.

Napoli Film Festival is one of the most significant film festivals in Campania; it has taken place every year since 1997 in June at Castel Sant'Elmo.

=== Holocaust: Sergio De Simone ===
In front of the apartment building at Via Morghen 65 bis (at Via Bonito), a memorial plaque and a pavement Stolperstein mark the life and death of Sergio De Simone (1937-1945), a seven year old Naples-born victim of the Holocaust's Bullenhuser-Damm Massacre.

Sergio's mother fled Naples with Sergio to her family in Rijeka, Croatia. Sergio was arrested with his Jewish family; deported to Germany; subjected to human experimentation in Hamburg, Germany — and subsequently murdered. His life is commemorated annually on Naples' Remembrance Day, January 27.

Via Morghen 65 bis: 40°50′41.9″N 14°14′03.7″E

=== Culture and sport ===
Napoli Comicon – Salone Internazionale del Fumetto is an annual fair dedicated to comics and animation that took place every year, in Castel Sant'Elmo (now held at the Mostra d'Oltremare, in the Fuorigrotta district).

Internapoli Camaldoli S.S.D. is the area's main football team. The neighborhood also hosts the sports complex that grew up around the Stadio Arturo Collana in Naples, where rugby, judo, athletics, swimming, volleyball, artistic gymnastics, skating, tennis, fencing, American football and soccer are practiced.

The stadium, built during the Fascist era with the name "Stadio dei martiri fascisti" or "Stadio Littorio", has long been the home field of Naples before the completion of the San Paolo Stadium in 1959, and is still that of the A.P. Partenope Rugby.

It was also the scene of dramatic events during the Four Days of Naples, and therefore the adjacent square took on the name of Piazza Quattro Giornate.

The Vomero was also the seat of the women's basketball team Vomero Basket, champion of Italy in the 2006–07 season, even though she played for a long time at PalaBarbuto due to the impracticability of the necklace gym.

Finally from the 2012–13 season the Stadio Arturo Collana hosts the women's soccer team of Naples.

In this district there is also the seat of the Vomero Tennis Club, which hosts every national and international tennis event.

The highest point of the neighborhood is the Certosa di San Martino, with an altitude of 251 metres.

== See also ==
The Petraio
