= Pino Pinelli (painter) =

Italian painter (1938–2024)

- Born: 1 October 1938; Catania, Italy
- Died: 30 April 2024 (aged 85); Milan, Italy
- Occupation: Painter

Giuseppe "Pino" Pinelli (1 October 1938 – 30 April 2024) was an Italian painter.

== Life and career ==
Born in Catania, after gaining initial recognition in Sicily, in 1963 Pinelli moved to Milan, where in 1968 he held his first solo exhibition at La Bergamini gallery. In the 1970s, he was among the major representatives of the Pittura analitica ('analytic painting') art movement.

Pinelli's art was characterized by aniconism, and after the series "Topologie" and "Monocromi", starting from the second half of the 1970s his art focused on fragmentation. A key role in his art was given to perception, intended as 'part and parcel of an indivisible sensory and psychic totality that is at the origins of our emotional as well as our rational response to images and what they suggest', and an important function was given to the often unusual choice of materials.

Active until his later years, Pinelli died in Milan on 30 April 2024, at the age of 85.
