= Massimo Pica Ciamarra =

Italian architect (born 1937)

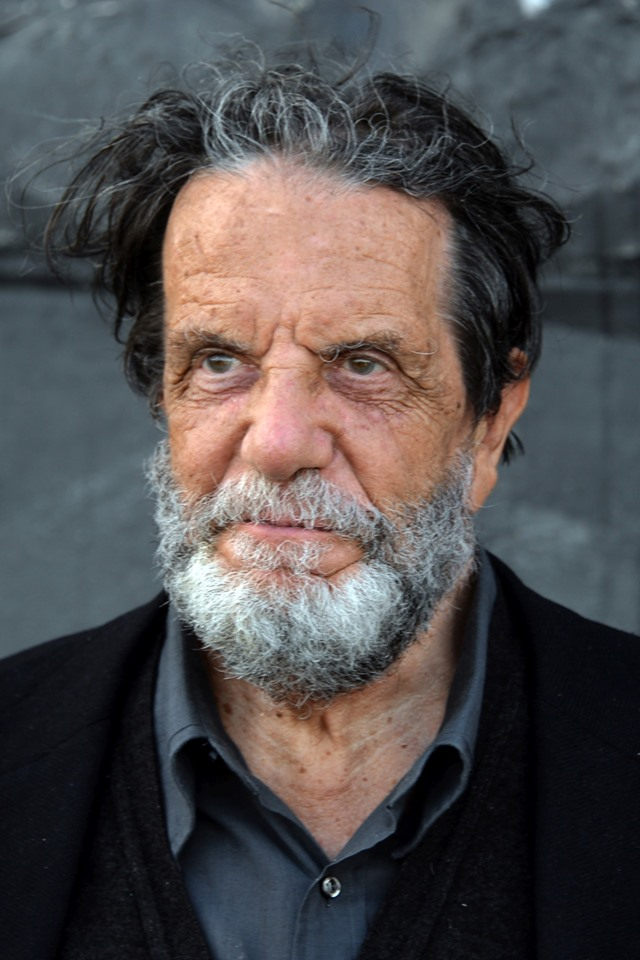
- Born: 9 July 1937 (age 89); Naples, Italy
- Occupation: Architect
- Buildings: Città della Scienza; buildings in the Centro direzionale di Napoli; Monte Sant'Angelo Campus; San Giorgio library; Casa Bianca.

Massimo Pica Ciamarra (Naples, 9 July 1937) is an Italian architect and theoretician. He has been active since the 1960s, designing over thirty buildings recognised by the Italian Ministry of Culture as "significant for the history of contemporary architecture" in Italy, across nine regions, including, in Naples, the ENEL Twin Towers, the Monte Sant'Angelo Campus of the University of Naples Federico II, and the Piazzale Tecchio in Fuorigrotta. He served as vice-president of the Italian Institute of Architecture from 1997 until 2011, and has been, since 2006, the editor-in-chief of The Carré Bleu. From 1971 until retirement in 2007, he held a professorship in architectural design at the University of Naples Federico II.

== Biography ==
=== Early years ===
Pica Ciamarra was born in Naples to an upper-class family, shortly before the beginning of World War II, which would result in widespread devastation in the city. He studied architecture at the University of Naples Federico II, graduating in 1960. Shortly thereafter, between 1961 and 1968, the first building he designed, the Officine Angus in Casavatore, was completed – in 1969, the building won the Italian Institute of Architecture Campania prize. In 1971, he was appointed Professor of Architectural Design at his alma mater, where he stayed until retirement in 2007. The following year he founded his own practice, Pica Ciamarra Associati, which is to this day headquartered in the Casa Bianca in Naples, an old family farmhouse he had entirely remodelled for mostly residential use between 1964 and 1970.

=== Mid-career to present ===
Since the early 1970s and until the 2000s, his firm was heavily involved in designing University and Faculty buildings throughout Italy, several of which have since been included in the Italian Ministry of Culture's Census of Italian Architectures from 1945 to today. His first such works were, in 1971, the pharmacy building for the University of Messina, and the following year the Arcavacata campus of the University of Calabria.

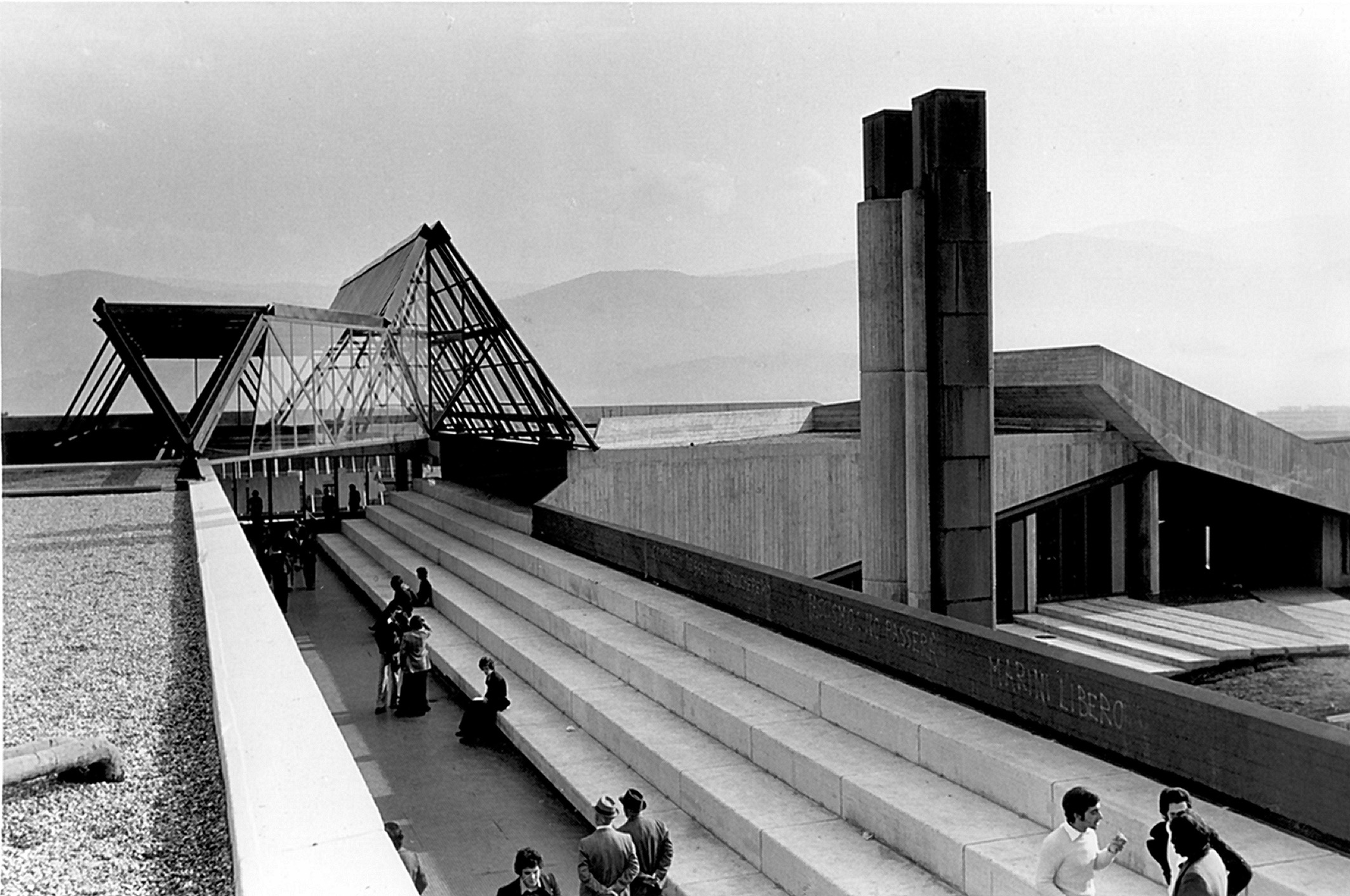
Arcavacata Campus of the University of Calabria

In the 1980s and 1990s, he designed several buildings for the University of Salerno, as well as the new sciences and economics Monte Sant'Angelo Campus for the University of Naples Federico II, the main campus and law building of the University of Molise, and the medicine building for the University of Campania – Vanvitelli in Caserta. His contribution to university buildings also includes the 1980 renovations of the 16th-century Saluzzo di Corigliano palace in Naples and of the Mascabruno palace in Portici, which now host departments of the University of Naples "L'Orientale" and University of Naples Federico II respectively.

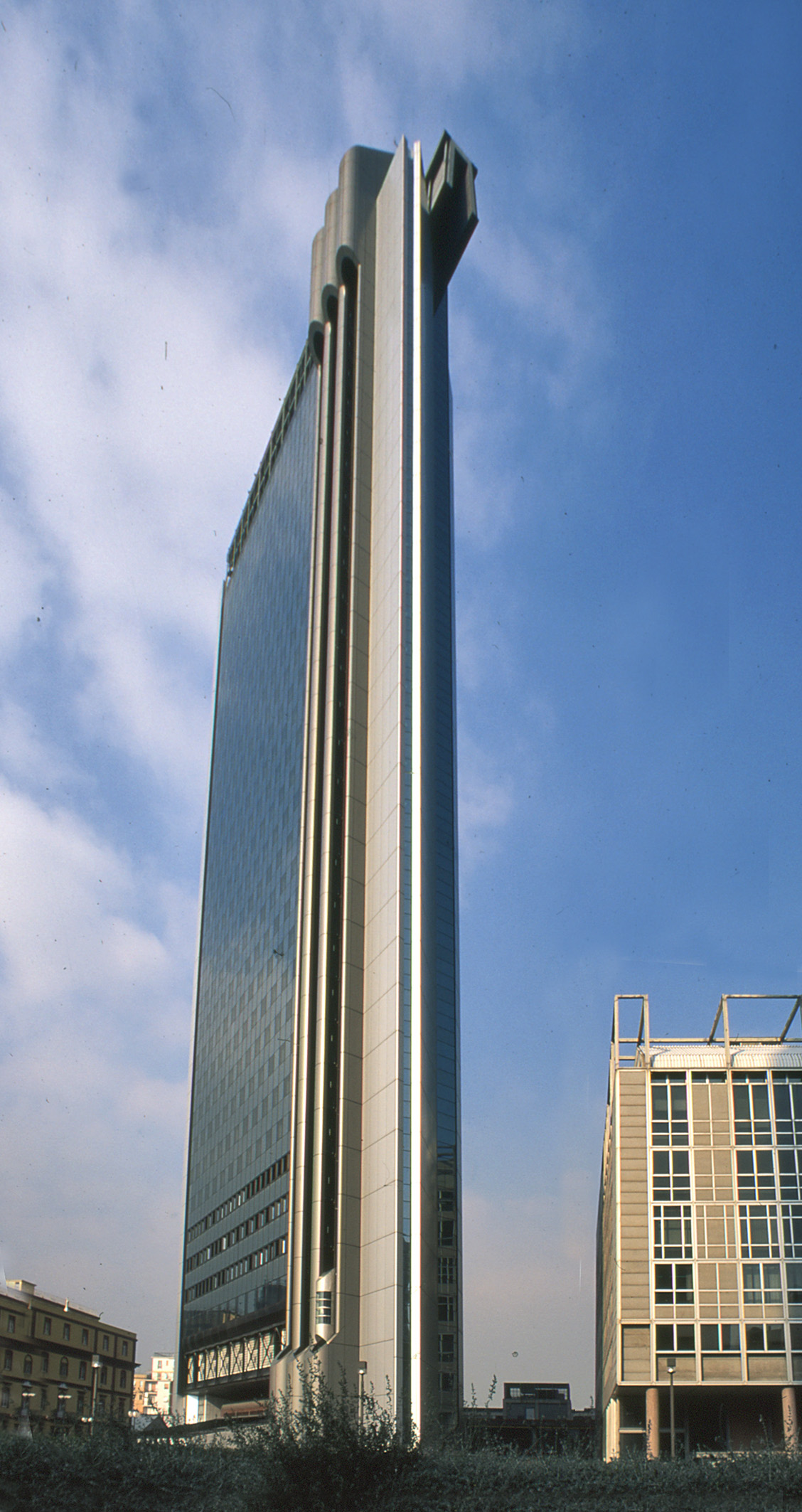
One of the ENEL "twin" towers in the Naples business district.

In those years, his practice was very active in Naples, designing multiple buildings which went on to significantly alter the landscape and the skyline of much of the city. Between the late 1980s and the early 1990s, he designed several buildings as part of the then-new business district, including the second-tallest buildings in Naples, the ENEL "twin" towers. These are adjacent to the Naples court house, which he had designed in the early 1970s. At the opposite end of the city, in the Fuorigrotta district, his design of the CNR "Istituto Motori" and of the nearby square majorly modified the area's layout. In the neighbouring Bagnoli district, he designed in 1993 the Città della Scienza (Italian for "City of Science") museum, which – until partly destroyed by a fire in 2013 – was visited by hundreds of thousands of visitors yearly.

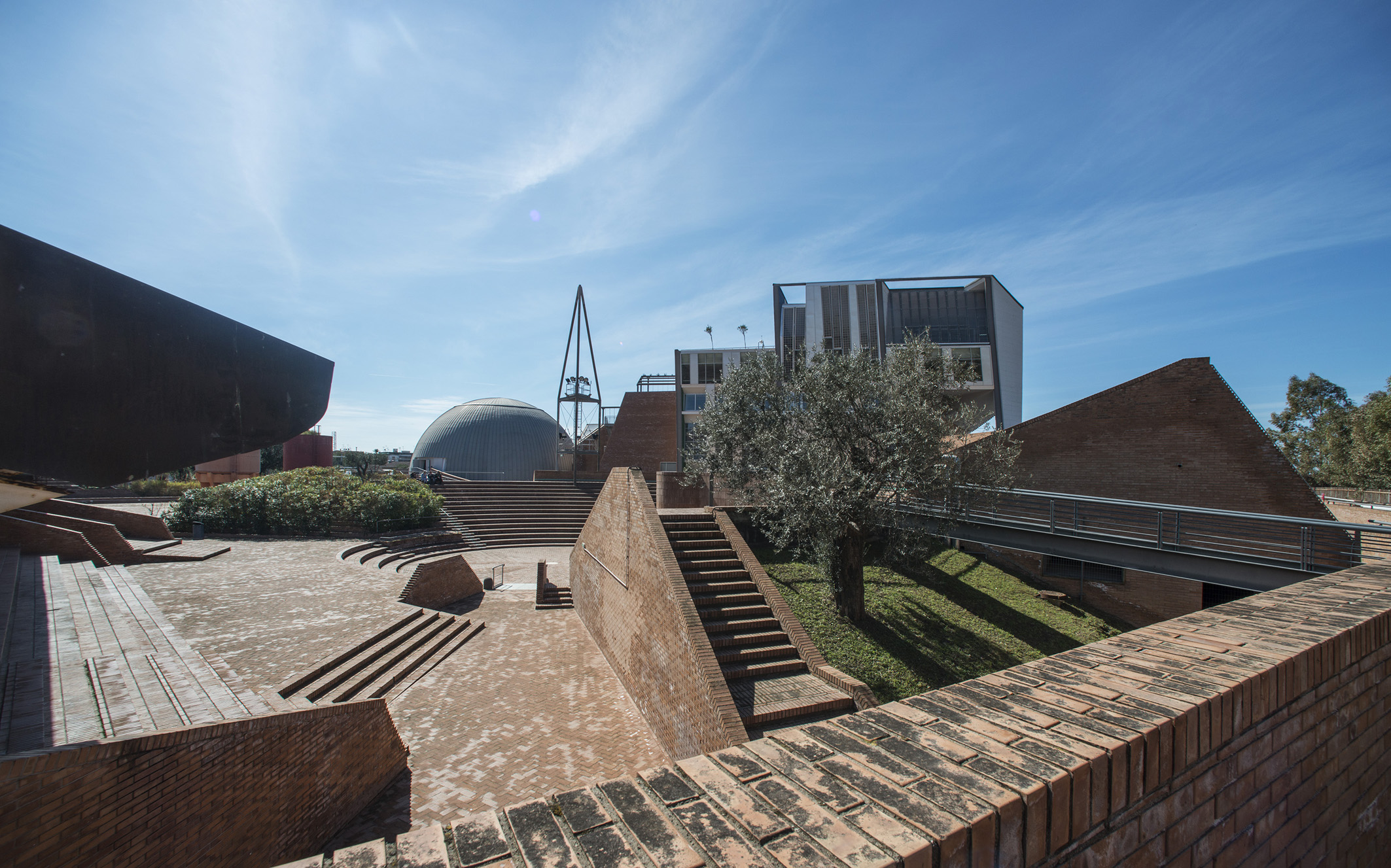
Museum of the Human Body – Corporea, Naples

In the 2000s, he continued developing the Città della Scienza, by designing in 2003 the Corporea Museum of the Human Body, completed in 2017. The year after, in 2004, the CEINGE building he designed was completed. His other 21st century buildings recognised as significant by the Italian Ministry of Culture include the San Giorgio library in Pistoia and an Auchan shopping mall in Naples.

=== Theoretical activity ===
Alongside his professional activity, Pica Ciamarra has kept an active interest in architectural theory, particularly promoting a relational view of architecture, which above all values the interactions between the buildings and their natural, architectural and human context. For much of his life, from 1971 until 2007, he held a professorship in architectural design at the University of Naples Federico II. Since 1997, he has held leadership roles within the Italian Institute of Architecture, first serving as vice-president until 2011, and since then as a member of the consultative board of the wise. Starting in 2006, he has also been the editor-in-chief of the architecture journal Le Carré Bleu, published in Italian, French and English. Since 2012, he has been the vice-president of the Italian foundation for bioarchitecture and a professor at the International Academy of Architecture.

More recently, from the mid-2010s onwards, he has been collaborating with the Center for Near Space of the Italian Institute for the Future, developing the new conceptual framework of Orbitecture, aimed at proposing novel lines of development for the space architecture of the mid- and late-21st century. As a framework for all of his theoretical activity – which, especially since the early 2020s, has been increasingly focussing on addressing climate change and the energy conversion from within an architectural framework -, he founded in 2018 the Civilizzare l'Urbano ("Civilising the Urban") foundation, this collaboration led to the publication of the book of the same name[13], which explores the roots, theses, and perspectives of the extensive theoretical and experimental research featured in the large-scale monographic exhibition at the Museo della Pace / MAMT of the Fondazione Mediterraneo. On this occasion, Pica Ciamarra received the Mediterranean “Architecture” Award—Special Edition 2018[14]. Among the most recent honors are the Nations Award 2025 (Ancient Theatre of Taormina) and the IN/Architettura 2026 Lifetime Achievement Award (Venice Biennale, Ca’ Giustinian), accompanied by the lecture "From Architecture to 'Living Environments'"

== Main works ==
This list only includes completed works recognised as significant for the history of contemporary architecture in Italy by the Italian Ministry of Culture.

- Officine Angus, Casavatore, 1961–68
- "Ina Casa" Neighbourhood, Ostuni, 1961–67 (with Riccardo Dalisi and Francesco Della Sala)
- Casa Multifamiliare a Posillipo ("Multifamily house in Posillipo"), Naples, 1964–70
- Nuova Borsa Merci ("New Commodity Exchange"), Napoli, 1964–71 (with Michele Capobianco and Riccardo Dalisi)
- Wenner House, Naples, 1970–71
- G. House in Punta Lagno, Massa Lubrense, 1971–73
- Pharmacy building – University of Messina, Messina, 1971–80 (with R. Dalisi)
- New courthouse, Naples, 1971–90 (with Michele Capobianco, Corrado Beguinot, Daniele Zagaria)
- Arcavacata Campus – University of Calabria, Rende, 1972–75
- C. House, Massa Lubrense, 1975–78
- Renovation of the Saluzzo di Corigliano palace, Naples, 1980– 87 (with Ezio Bruno De Felice)
- Monte Sant'Angelo Campus – University of Naples Federico II, Naples, 1980–97 (with Michele Capobianco, Daniele Zagaria and Renato Raguzzino)
- Humanities Library – University of Salerno, Fisciano, 1983–2001
- Rettorato (President's office) – University of Salerno, Fisciano, 1983–2002
- Aula Magna ("Great Hall") – University of Salerno, Fisciano, 1983–2002
- Istituto Motori – National Research Council (Italy), Naples, 1984–90
- "Quadrifoglio" lecture theatre – University of Basilicata, Potenza, 1985–87
- ENEL Twin Towers, Naples, 1986–95 (with Renato Avolio De Martino and Giulio De Luca)
- New Square in Fuorigrotta, Naples, 1987–90
- Twin Towers, Naples, 1988–95
- Law building – University of Molise, Campobasso, 1988
- CEINGE centre – University of Naples Federico II, Naples, 1988–2004
- University laboratories – University of Salerno, Baronissi, 1989–97
- "San Paolo" shopping mall, Naples, 1989–2000
- Cittadella Universitaria ("University Campus") – University of Molise, Campobasso, 1990–2009
- House and Park in Marianella, Naples, 1991–95
- Città della Scienza ("City of Science"), Naples, 1993–2003
- Teuco-Guzzini office building, Montelupone, 1995–1996
- San Giorgio library, Pistoia, 2000–06 (with F. Archidiacono, F. Calabrese, A. Verderosa)
- Museum of Hydroelectric Energy, Cedegolo, 2000–08 (with C. Gasparotti and others)
- Auchan shopping mall, Naples, 2002–10
- Museum of the Human Body – Corporea, Naples, 2003–2017

== Bibliography ==
- Del Seppia M, Sainati F. (2023), Massimo Pica Ciamarra – progettare secondo principi. LetteraVentidue. (in Italian)
- Lima A.I. (2019). The architecture of Pica Ciamarra Associati – from urban fragments to ecological systems. Axel Menges. (in English)
- Zevi B., Koenig G.K., Schimmerling A., Nicoletti M, Locci M., Scaglione P. (1988). Pica Ciamarra Associati / Architettura e Progetti – a collection of essays. De Luca Mondadori. (in English, French and Spanish)
- Scaglione P. (1985). Pica Ciamarra Associati: architettura per i luoghi. Kappa. (in Italian)
