= Michele Capobianco =

Italian architect

- Born: 8 June 1921; Vitulano, Province of Benevento, Kingdom of Italy
- Died: October 2005 (aged 84)
- Education: University of Naples
- Occupation: Architect

Michele Capobianco (8 June 1921 – October 2005) was an Italian architect, mainly active in the city of Naples.

== Life and career ==
Born in 1921 in Vitulano, province of Benevento, Capobianco graduated in architecture in 1946. During his university years, he was a student of Marcello Canino and worked in his studio starting in 1943. Immediately after graduating, he opened a studio with Arrigo Marsiglia and Marialfredo Sbriziolo. In 1948, Capobianco received his first commissions: a building in Poggioreale, the Latin America Pavilion (1948–52), and several residential buildings in the Commola Ricci park (1952–55).

In 1950, following a visit by a delegation of Swedish professors and students to study new popular neighborhoods, Capobianco was invited to Sweden. In Stockholm, he studied under Sven Markelius and explored Nordic urban culture. In 1955, he designed a residential building in Piazzetta Santo Stefano (then Via Piave), for which he won the IN/Arch prize in 1961. At the same time, together with Giulio De Luca, he designed the Decina building in Grifeo Park.

In the 1960s, Capobianco was actively involved in the design of popular neighborhoods. In 1964, together with Riccardo Dalisi and Massimo Pica Ciamarra, he co-designed the Nuova Borsa Merci Building. From 1973 to 1988, he served as an emeritus professor of architectural design at the Faculty of Federico II University. He collaborated with his brother Antonio, Pica Ciamarra, Daniele Zagaria, and Corrado Beguinot on the design of the new Naples Courthouse. He also conceived a new building for the Scientific High School in the Arenella district, primarily to serve the nearby Rione Alto. IN 1973, he designed the Technical Institute in Pomigliano d'Arco.

In the 1980s, he designed several popular districts in Miano as part of the PSER program, as well as multiple buildings in the Naples Business District, and the Vanvitelli, Medaglie d'Oro, and Colli Aminei metro stations. In 1992, he was awarded a second IN/Arch prize and later founded the architecture magazine ArQ. His son, Lorenzo, also pursued a career in architecture.

Capobianco died in October 2005.

== Sources ==
- D'Auria, Antonio (1993). Michele Capobianco. Milan: Electa.
- Lama, Diego (2007). Storie di cemento. Gli architetti raccontano. Naples: CLEAN.
