= Naples Courthouse =

Judiciary building in Naples, Italy

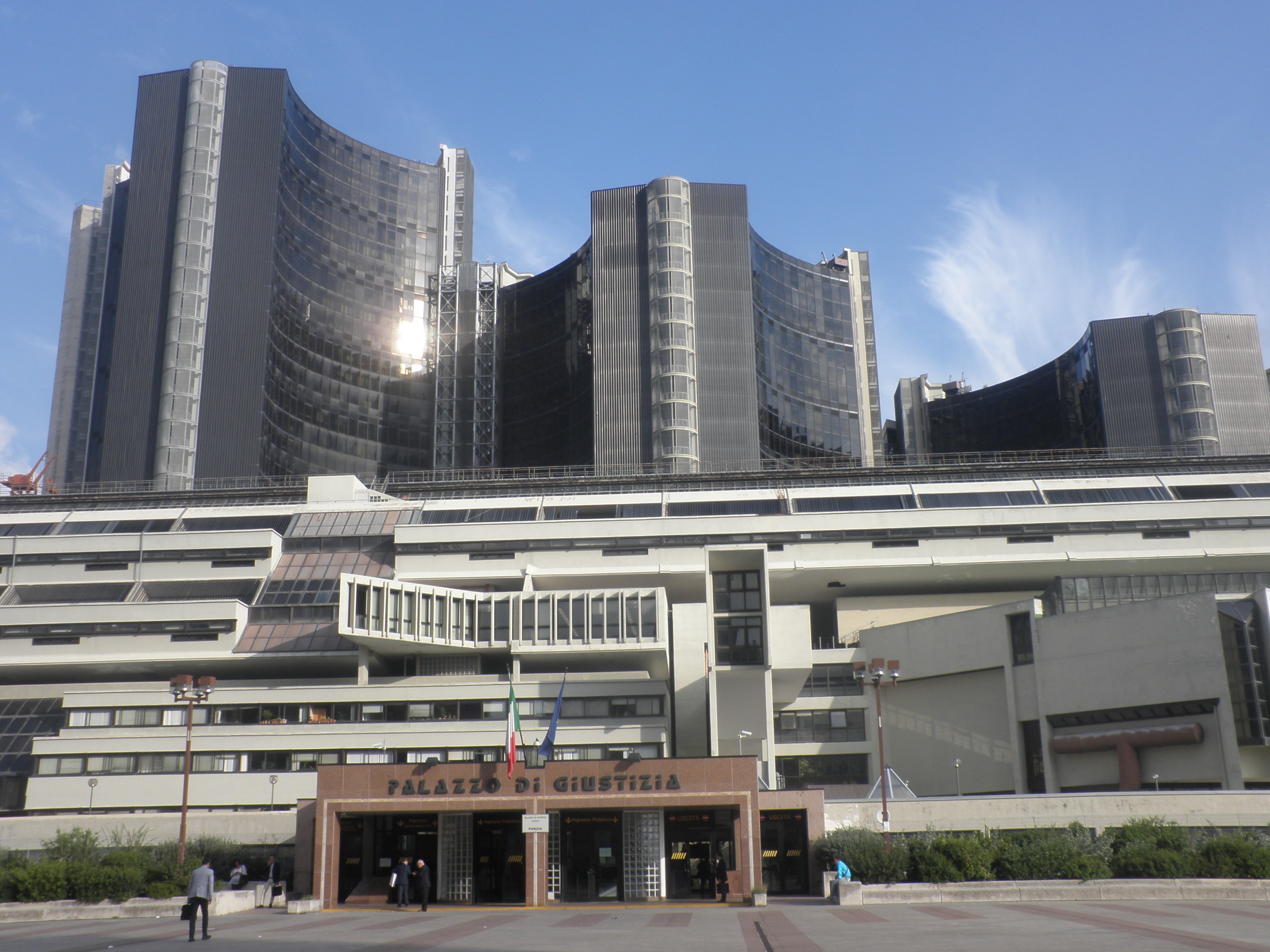
- Interactive map of the Naples Courthouse area

General information
- Location: Naples, Campania, Italy
- Coordinates: 40°51′35.63″N 14°16′59.43″E
- Construction started: 1980
- Completed: 1995
- Opening: 6 November 1995; 30 years ago

Design and construction
- Architects: Michele Capobianco, Antonio Capobianco, Massimo Pica Ciamarra, Daniele Zagaria
- Structural engineer: Corrado Beguinot

The Naples Courthouse (Italian: Palazzo di Giustizia di Napoli, lit. 'Palace of Justice of Naples') is a judicial complex located at the Business District in Naples, Italy.

The building consists of three towers and houses the Court of Naples, the Court of Appeal, the Public Prosecutor's Office, the Attorney General's Office, the Surveillance Court, the UNEP office, and the criminal division of the Giudice di pace.

== History ==
Before the construction of the new building, the judicial offices of Naples were dispersed across more than thirty different locations. Recognizing the need to centralize these functions, plans were made as early as 1957 to consolidate the main judicial offices in a single facility. The Court was at that time housed in Castel Capuano on Via dei Tribunali. In 1966, legislation was introduced to facilitate the construction of a new "Palace of Justice" in a yet-to-be-determined area.

In 1970, a budget of 16 billion lire was allocated for the development of the judicial complex. Construction officially commenced in 1980; however, work was immediately halted due to the Irpinia earthquake. Further delays ensued after an arson attack in 1990.

The building was finally completed and became fully operational on 6 November 1995. The project was carried out by Mededil, a company belonging to the IRI-Italstat group, which also developed the nearby Business District (Centro Direzionale). The complex was designed by architects Michele Capobianco, Massimo Pica Ciamarra, Antonio Capobianco, and Daniele Zagaria, and engineer Corrado Beguinot.

== Sources ==
- Napoli e dintorni. Milan: Touring Club Italiano. 2001.
- Castagnaro, Alessandro (1998). Architettura del Novecento a Napoli. Il noto e l'inedito. Edizioni Scientifiche Italiane.
