= Mostra d'Oltremare =

Exposition grounds in Naples, Italy

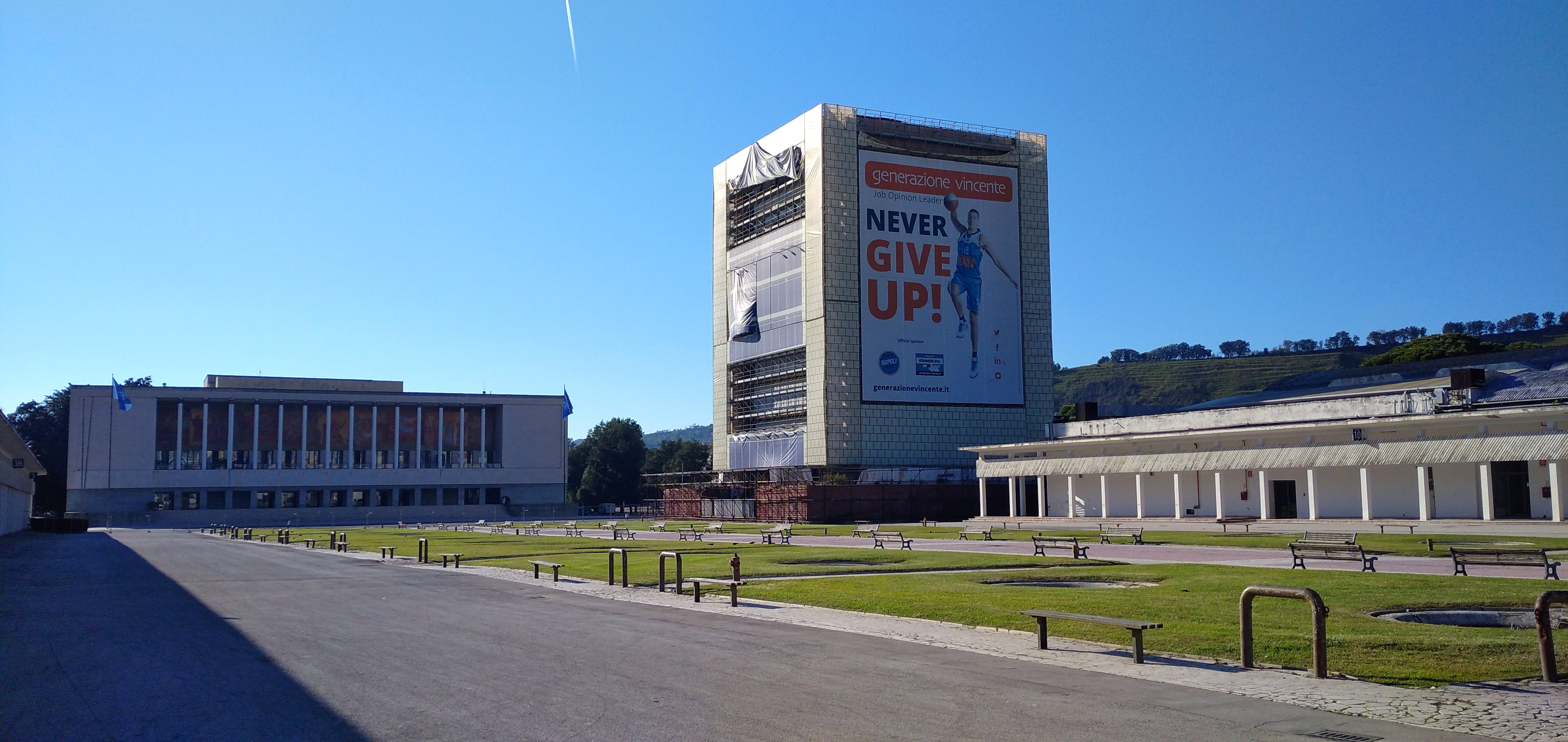
Mostra d'Oltremare, piazzale Colombo

The Mostra d'Oltremare ("Overseas Exhibition") in Naples is one of the main trade fair venues in Italy and, together with the Fiera del Levante in Bari, the largest in Southern Italy. The venue covers an area of 720,000 square metres (7,800,000 sq ft) and includes buildings of considerable historical and architectural interest, as well as more modern exhibition pavilions, fountains (including the monumental Fountain of the Esedra), a tropical aquarium, gardens with a great variety of tree species and an archaeological park.

== Location and connections ==
The exhibition is located in the neapolitan district of Fuorigrotta: the area is connected to the rest of the city through the integrated transport system, thanks to the Cumana, line 6 (Mostra) and line 2 of the underground, the latter housed in the inside the Campi Flegrei railway station.

== History ==
The exhibition, born as the Triennale d'Oltremare, was conceived as a "Universal Thematic Exhibition", together with the park of the Universal Exhibition of Rome (later EUR), and set up in 1937, to host an event aimed at celebrating political expansion and economy of fascist Italy on the seas and in the so-called overseas lands.

For this purpose, the city of Naples was chosen, which, by virtue of its central position in the Mediterranean, was considered the ideal starting point for the enterprising colonial policy of the fascist regime. The subject chosen for the first exhibition was a "Celebration of the glory of the Italian Empire in North Africa and the Mediterranean".

The decision to locate the fair in the neapolitan capital was followed by lively discussions in the city on the location of the initiative: among the proposed locations, the Conca Flegrea – between Bagnoli and Fuorigrotta – was finally chosen, which due to its flat configuration, proximity to the sea and to the archaeological areas of Cuma and Averno, according to the promoters it could perform the function of tourist and commercial pole better than any other place.

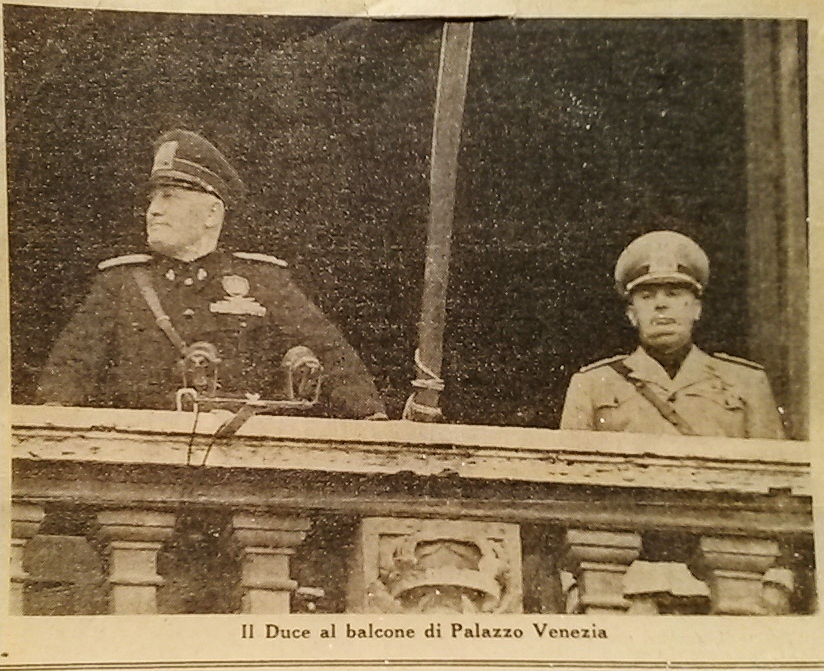
Benito Mussolini with Pietro Capoferri on the balcony of Palazzo Venezia.

In this way, the project was historically placed within the wider program for the revitalization of the city that Mussolini had enunciated under the slogan "Naples must live" and had articulated in the famous five points listed to neapolitan citizens in 1931: "agriculture, navigation, industry, crafts, tourism".

Inevitably, the construction of the exhibition influenced the entire surrounding urban environment, which, if it underwent the demolition of the ancient agricultural farmhouse of Castellana, however, saw the creation of a real business and residential center, whose fulcrum became the modern Viale Augusto, road axis with two carriageways separated by a large central flowerbed with palms and pines, a road with a slightly and imperceptibly curved course, suitable for leading up to the square at the entrance to the exhibition.

It took just sixteen months to build the entire structure. Built on over 1,000,000 m^{2} (11,000,000 sq ft), it consisted of: 36 exhibition pavilions; an office building; an outdoor arena with a capacity of more than 10,000 people; two theaters; an Olympic swimming pool; restaurants and cafes; an amusement park, a wildlife park and a tropical aquarium; a pre-existing archaeological area of the Roman period, included within the perimeter.

The exhibition re-proposed in its architectural structure the characteristics of the overseas colonies – in a context of evident imperial propaganda of the regime – and was conceived according to the models of green architecture; in fact the complex was configured from the beginning as a picturesque environment and today it can be considered as a significant episode of coexistence of the various artistic doctrines of the time.

This colossal ornamental plant, arranged to integrate the architecture, immediately presented innovative and contradictory aspects, as it was the vast repertoire of a provisional nature that represented a significant avant-garde role, compared to real works of art, assuming a function primary homologation with the spaces of the entire complex.

Officially inaugurated on May 9, 1940, by the Hon. Vincenzo Tecchio, then president of the exhibition and in the presence of King Vittorio Emanuele III, the "I Triennial Exhibition of the Italian Overseas Lands" ended just a month later, due to the start of World War II and the subsequent bombings that hit it with 60% of the buildings suffering extensive damage. This unforeseen event determined the total closure of the area, which was left in a total state of abandonment at the end of the conflict, due to economic but also ideological reasons.

In 1948 the "Triennial Exhibition of the Italian Overseas Lands" was transformed into the "Overseas Exhibition and Italian Labor in the World body", starting the reconstruction for the reopening. This happened on June 8, 1952, when the doors of the "I Triennial Exhibition of Italian Labor in the World" opened wide; the enormous damage caused by the war had meanwhile been repaired: the buildings, destroyed or half-destroyed, had been restored or rebuilt, the pre-existing ornamental cycle had been suitably restored and enriched, as well as the immense tree park.

The new function of the fair organization was initially identified in that of organizing documentary exhibitions on Italian activities and work in the world, as well as in pursuing purposes suitable for the promotion and economic and tourist enhancement of the city. The economic failure of the event caused an aggravation of the already very precarious financial situation, which was irreparably compromised and caused the cancellation of all the projects undertaken.

The exhibition was closed again, if not for some spaces and some periods; this gave rise, especially starting from the sixties, to a long and inexorable process of dispossession and decay, characterized by the partial and improper use of many structures, by the neglect of the green areas and, in particular, by the damage caused by occupation of the land on which the displaced people of the 1980 earthquake were arbitrarily settled, with no respect for the work, under the banner of a widespread condition of decay, which reached its peak in the early nineties.

=== Current and future ===
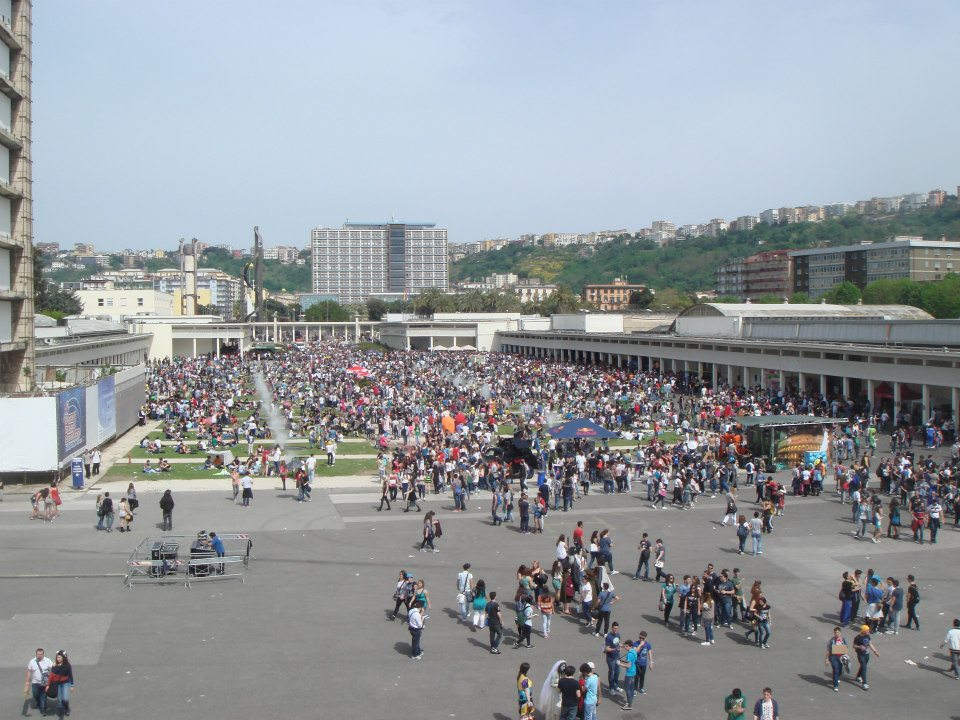
Piazzale Colombo seen from the Mediterranean Theater (Napoli Comicon 2013)

From January 1999, the core exhibition complex, an integral part of the historical-artistic heritage of the city, was able to rise to new life. In 2001 the organization became "Mostra d'Oltremare Spa", a new management company, owned by the Municipality of Naples, the Campania Region, the Province of Naples and the Naples Chamber of Commerce, and started a significant program of redevelopment and enhancement, combined with an economic-business development project.

The entire exhibition area has undergone a major renovation that brought it back to the level of an exhibition center of national and international interest and now the arrangement of the new Parco della cultura e del tempo libero (in Italian: Park of culture and leisure) is about to be completed, which, next to the Archaeological Park, the Congress Park and the exhibition Park, it will represent one of the four areas, the newest and most innovative one, in which the exhibition will be divided in the future.

More and more open to citizens, as well as to visitors, the exhibition will see two modern hotels and other structures built inside it that will allow the public to stay there and be able to enjoy the exhibition area and the numerous monuments of contemporary architecture, including the 'Arena Flegrea – where numerous festivals take place (including the Carosone Award) – the Mediterranean Theater, the Olympic Swimming Pool and the majestic Fountain of the Esedra.

Since 2003 it has been the permanent venue of the international Pizzafest event.

Since 2010 it is the seat of the annual fair dedicated to comics and animation Napoli Comicon.

In 2019 it hosted the media center and the press office of the XXX Universiade, as well as some sporting events. Diving competitions were held at the Fritz Dennerlein pool, while halls 3 and 6 hosted shooting and judo competitions, respectively.

== Pavilions and other architectural elements ==
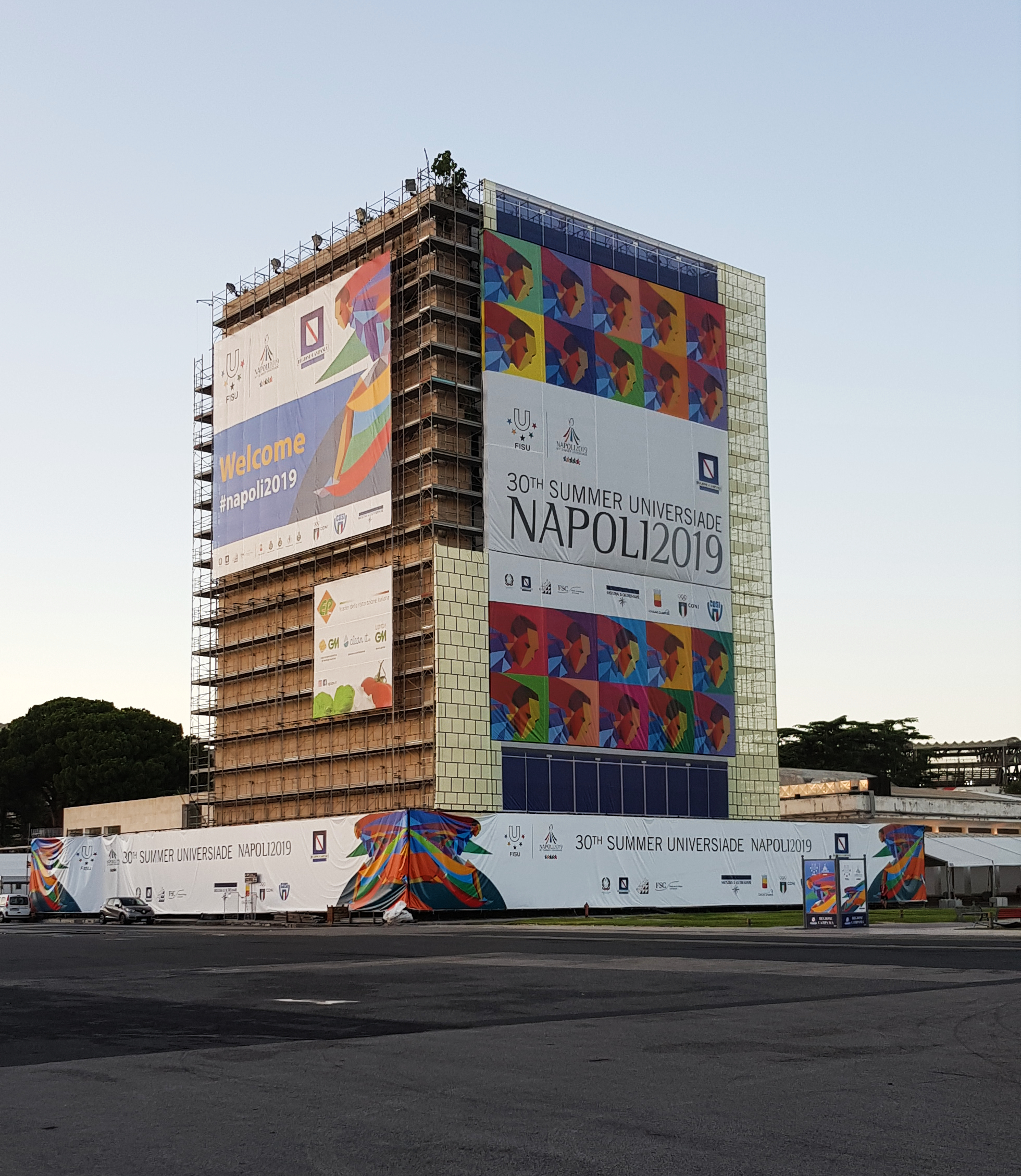
Pavilion of the Universiade to celebrate the XXX Universiade.

The exhibition park is one of the most valuable architectural complexes of pre-war and post-war Italian Rationalism. The planimetric simplicity of the detailed plan of the area, designed by Marcello Canino in 1938, contrasts with the contemporary EUR by Marcello Piacentini. The latter is characterized by the monumental thrust desired by the regime. The exhibition is set up on a plan that recalls the hippodamus system of the consolidated city through three axes that act as decumani and connected by axes that replace the hinges and at the end of them there is a pavilion that breaks the linearity of the paths. This design attitude of the plant by Canino shows that Naples, despite the neo-eclectic upsurge, has nevertheless absorbed the theoretical lesson of the Modern Movement, declining it to its geographical situation. The complex was heavily damaged during the Second World War and between the 1940s and 1950s it was restored using almost all the same designers who participated in 1938. Further damage occurred after the 1980 earthquake when most of the exhibition spaces were destined to host the displaced, on this occasion of emergency some pavilions representative of the modern neapolitan were demolished such as the botanical greenhouses of Carlo Cocchia and the Flegrean arena, demolished in the late 1980s and rebuilt again by Giulio De Luca after the impossibility of recovering the damaged arena of 1938.

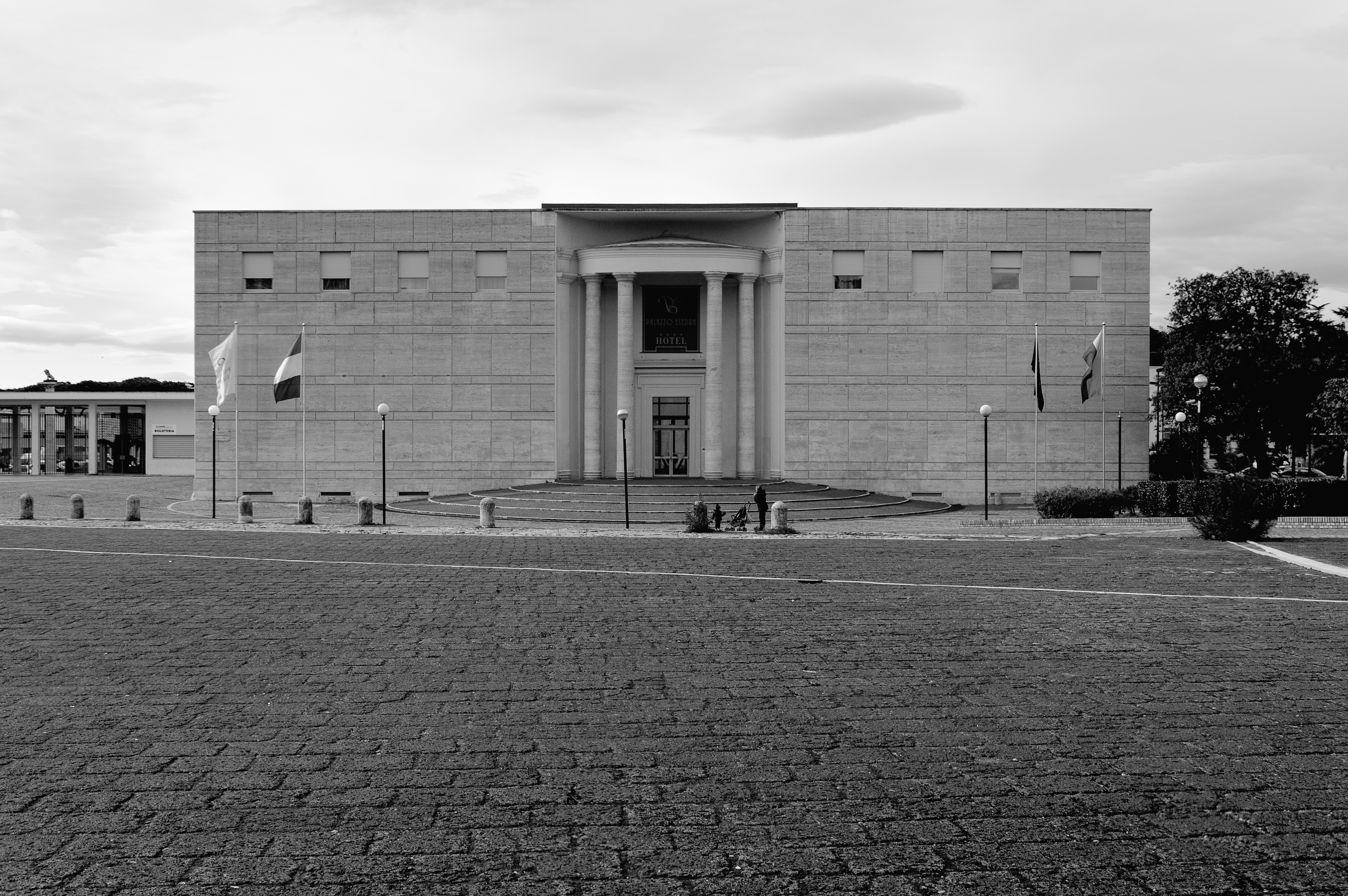
A frontal view of the Palazzo Canino

The Pavilion of the Italian Aegean Islands (the ‘Rhodes Pavilion’) was designed in 1938 by the Roman architect Giovanni Battista Ceas for the Geographical section of the Mostra d'Oltremare to celebrate the Italian occupation of the Dodecanese archipelago in May 1912.

=== Palazzo Canino (formerly the Office Building) ===
It forms the corner head of the main entrance. It was designed by Marcello Canino in 1940 and rebuilt in the rear part in 1952 by Delia Maione and currently restored by Luigi Casalini who has re-functionalized it in a hotel. The building is configured as a compact block with three levels in tuff and covered with travertine; in the center there is the full-height cut of the entrance hall decorated with a semi-elliptical colonnade pronaos. The interior is characterized by the succession of three courtyards that recall the Roman Domus. The interiors are decorated with frescoes by Emilio Notte and Franco Girosi.

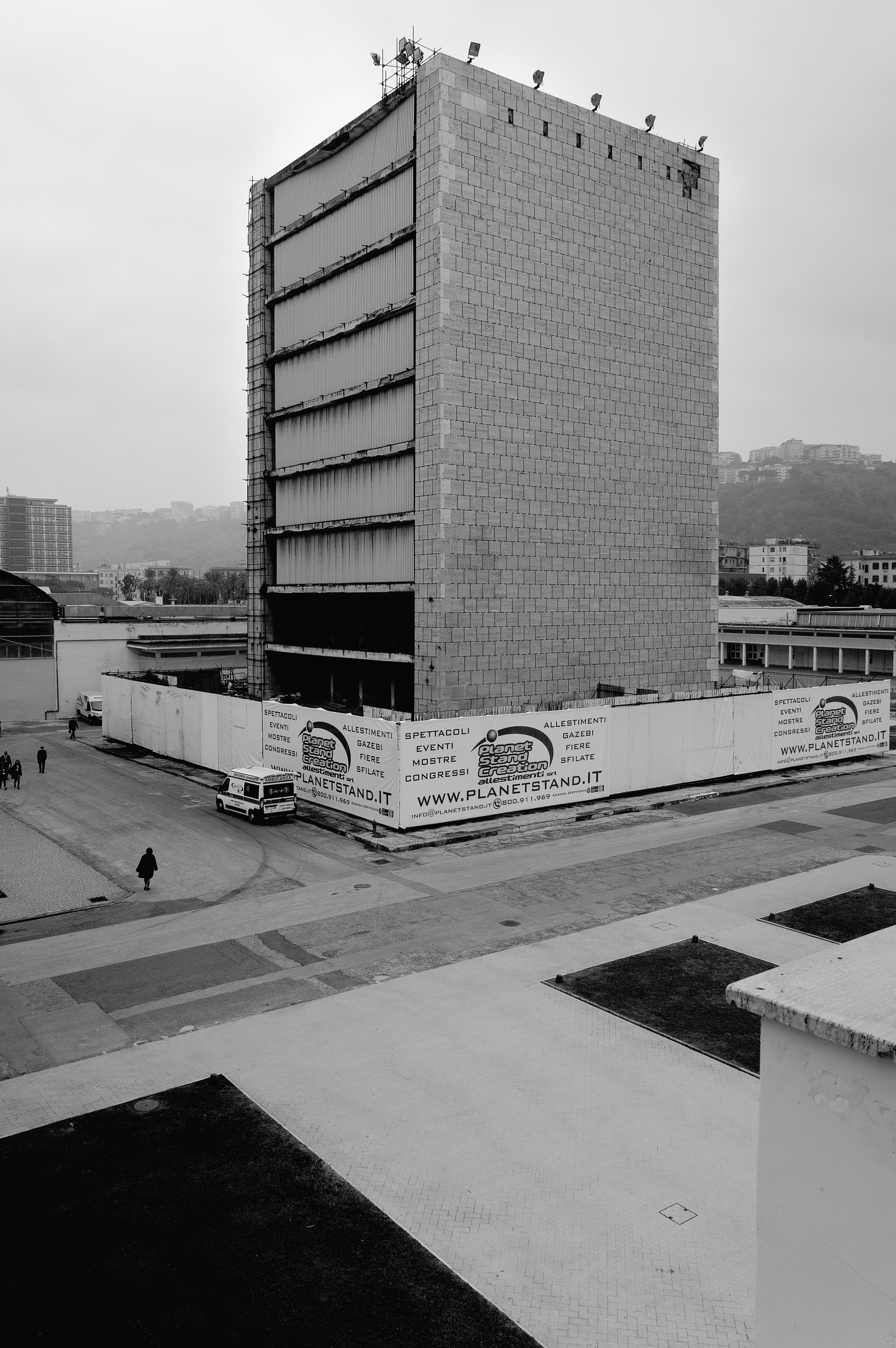
Torre delle Nazioni

=== Tower of Nations (formerly Tower of the National Fascist Party) ===
Made in 1940 by Venturino Ventura after winning the competition. The tower is a squat parallelepiped 24.50 m (80.4 ft) long by 42 m (138 ft) high, it rests on a base, originally decorated with bas-reliefs that exalted the regime by Pasquale Monaco and Vincenzo Meconio; the structure is characterized by the presence of two solid fronts in travertine that alternate with the empty elevations. The interior is characterized as a single room served by the elevator and stair block located in the center. Interesting is the play of the reinforced concrete overhangs of the floors, which at the time were considered daring due to the available calculation technology. It is currently being recovered on a project by the Corvino+Multari studio.

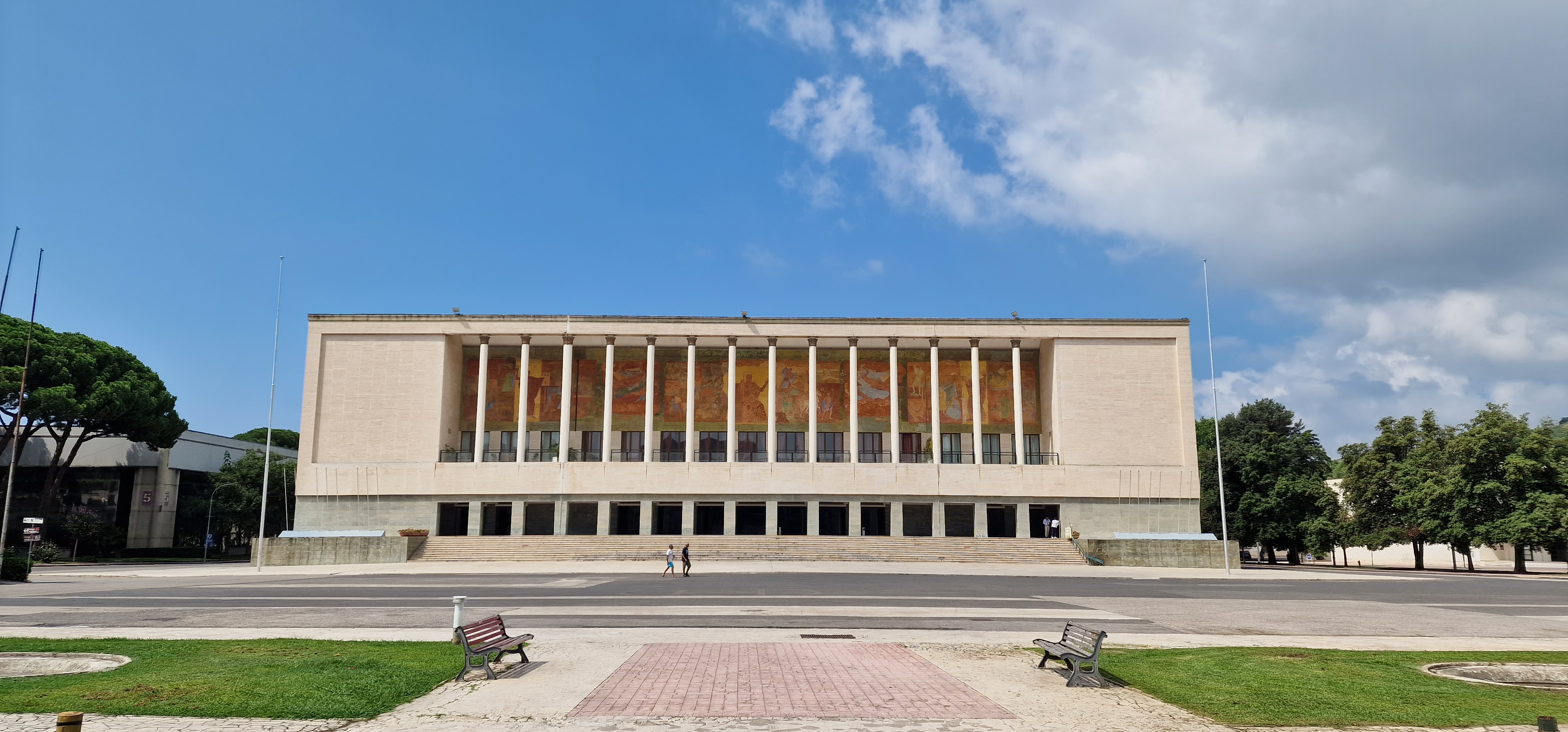
Frontal view of the Mediterranean Theater

=== The Mediterranean Theater (formerly the Palazzo dell'Arte) ===
It is the result of a national competition that featured designers with different linguistic and architectural approaches and is set to absorb the scenic backdrop of the main axis. The group of designers was composed of Nino Barillà, Vincenzo Gentile, Filippo Mellia and Giuseppe Sanbito, the interiors were handled by Luigi Piccinato who intervened both in the 1940 version and in 1952. Currently it has been restored by Cherubino Gambardella and the stage and dressing rooms in 2009.

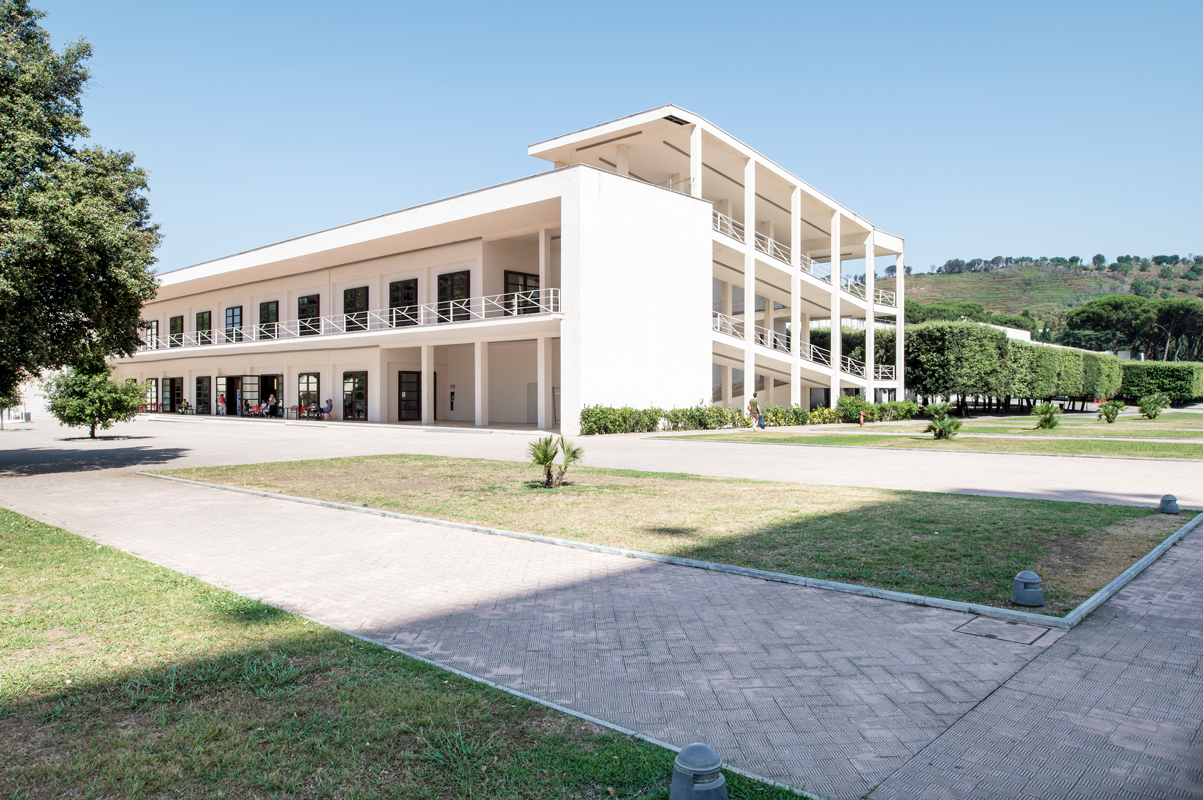
Restaurant with the swimming pool

=== Restaurant with swimming pool ===
The building, together with the Latin America pavilion, forms the head of the Fountain of the Esedra. This constraint strongly conditioned Carlo Cocchia to design the building in 1938 according to an asymmetrical T-shaped scheme characterized by the unusual functional coupling of an Olympic-size swimming pool with diving board in the stem of the T and the restaurant room at the head. The connection to the various floors is guaranteed by an architectural promenade of clear Lecorbusieran ancestry. In the 1952 restoration, carried out by Cocchia himself, the ramp was reconfigured by knocking down the roof slab and opening the lateral infills of the loggia on the main façade. Currently the building has been recovered by Massimo Pica Ciamarra who has recovered the original forms of the work and has adapted the entire building to the new requests by also adding an underground pool below the original one. The interiors are characterized by the three-tiered division of the dining room which allows spectators, guests of the restaurant, to easily observe the 180-degree view of the swimming pool, the Flegrea Arena and the Esedra Fountain. The floor is decorated with Neapolitan majolica with references to Mediterranean cuisine.

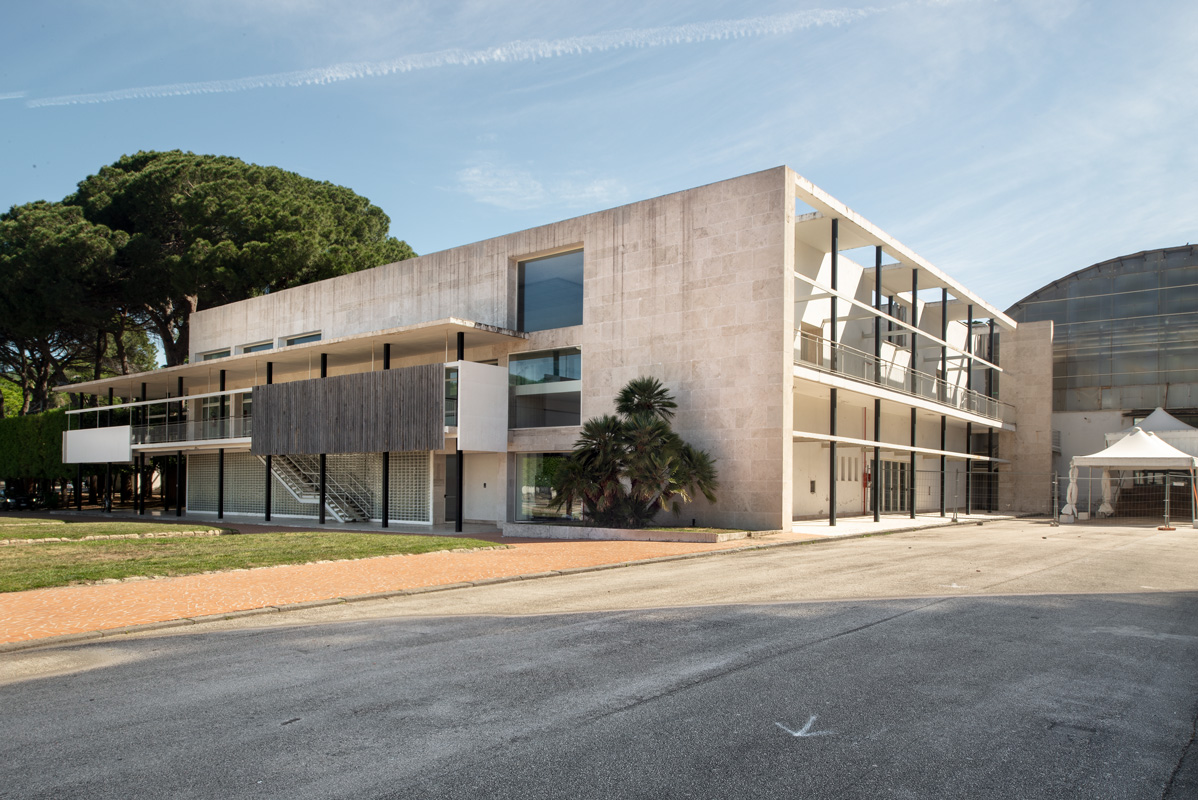
Latin America Pavilion

=== Latin America Pavilion (former Bank of Italy, Credit and Insurance Pavilions) ===
The Latin America Pavilion constitutes the other half of the headway leading to the Fountain. Designed in 1938 by Bruno Lapadula as a group of Bank of Italy pavilions arranged around a garden courtyard. On the façade overlooking the fountain was a painting by Giorgio Quaroni. The pavilions were damaged by war bombings and subsequently restored for the reopening in 1952 on a project by Michele Capobianco, Arrigo Marsiglia and Alfredo Sbriziolo. The 1952 project endowed the pavilion with a loggia characterized by a rationalist appearance with typical Nordic origins that recall in particular the Dutch neoplasticism and the slender steel structures of Ludwig Mies van der Rohe. Currently the pavilion has been recovered by Studio Campagnuolo and Cherubino Gambardella.

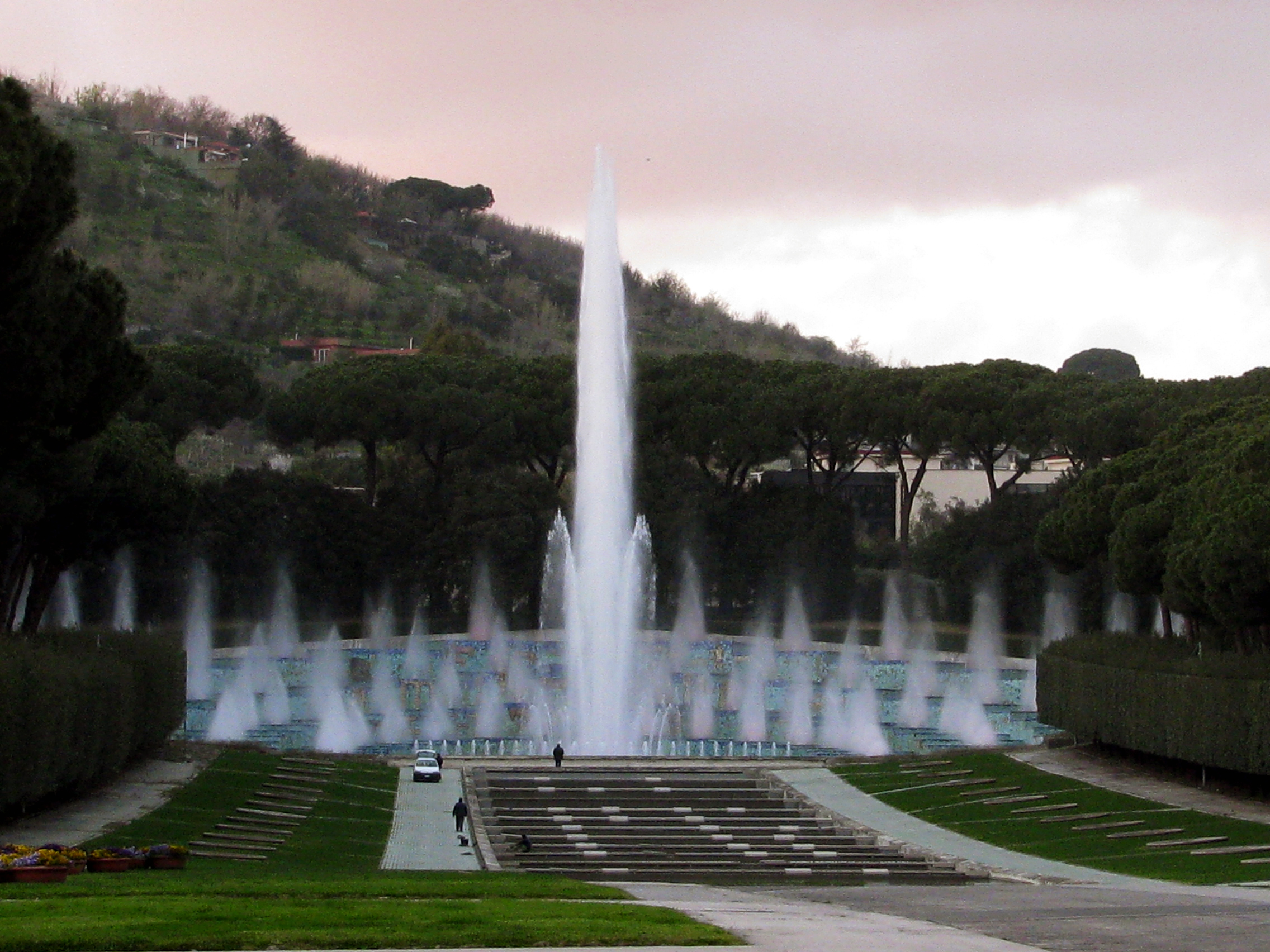
View of the Fountain of the Esedra

=== Fountain of the Esedra ===
The Fountain of the Esedra is one of the city's monumental fountains. Designed by Luigi Piccinato and Carlo Cocchia in 1938, on the occasion of the realization of the exhibition park, it is inspired by the monumental fountains of the eighteenth-century garden of the Royal Palace of Caserta; the scenic backdrop is entrusted to Monte Sant'Angelo, a relief of the Campi Flegrei. The fountain consists of two bodies, a rectangular one that slopes down towards Piazzale Colombo characterized by a sequence of twelve communicating pools, and the other semicircular, called the water amphitheater, composed of four concentric crowns where the jets are positioned. On the occasion of the reopening of the complex in 1952, the amphitheater of the waters was decorated with mosaics by Giuseppe Macedonio. At the edges, along the parterre, there are twenty-four small tanks that surround the main basins, all the space is enclosed between rows of pines. Currently it has been recovered and re-functionalized.

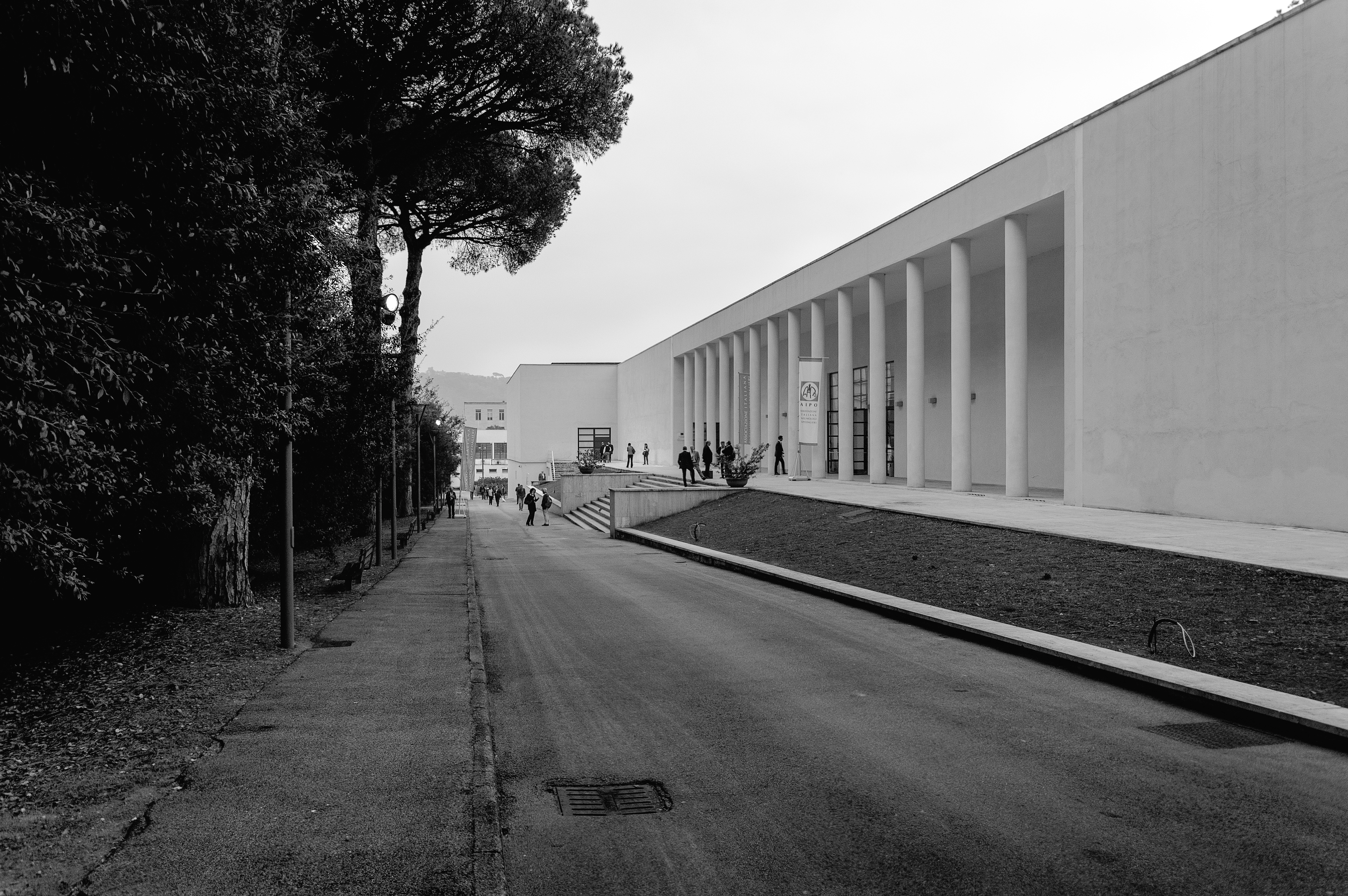
Main elevation of the Congress Center.

=== Congress Center (former Health, Race and Culture Pavilion) ===
Designed in 1938 by Ferdinando Chiaromonte, one of the most active neapolitan designers of the period, and restored for the 1952 reopening based on a design by Delia Maione and Elena Mendia. It is characterized by the marked academic setting of the volume, the intention was to create a filter building between the fountains and the nearby Arena Flegrea. The façade, about one hundred and fifty meters long, is equipped with a pronaos of clear classical taste served by a staircase that acts as a stylobate to absorb the steep slope of the ground. The double-height interior was reorganized after the restoration work that involved various pavilions of the complex.

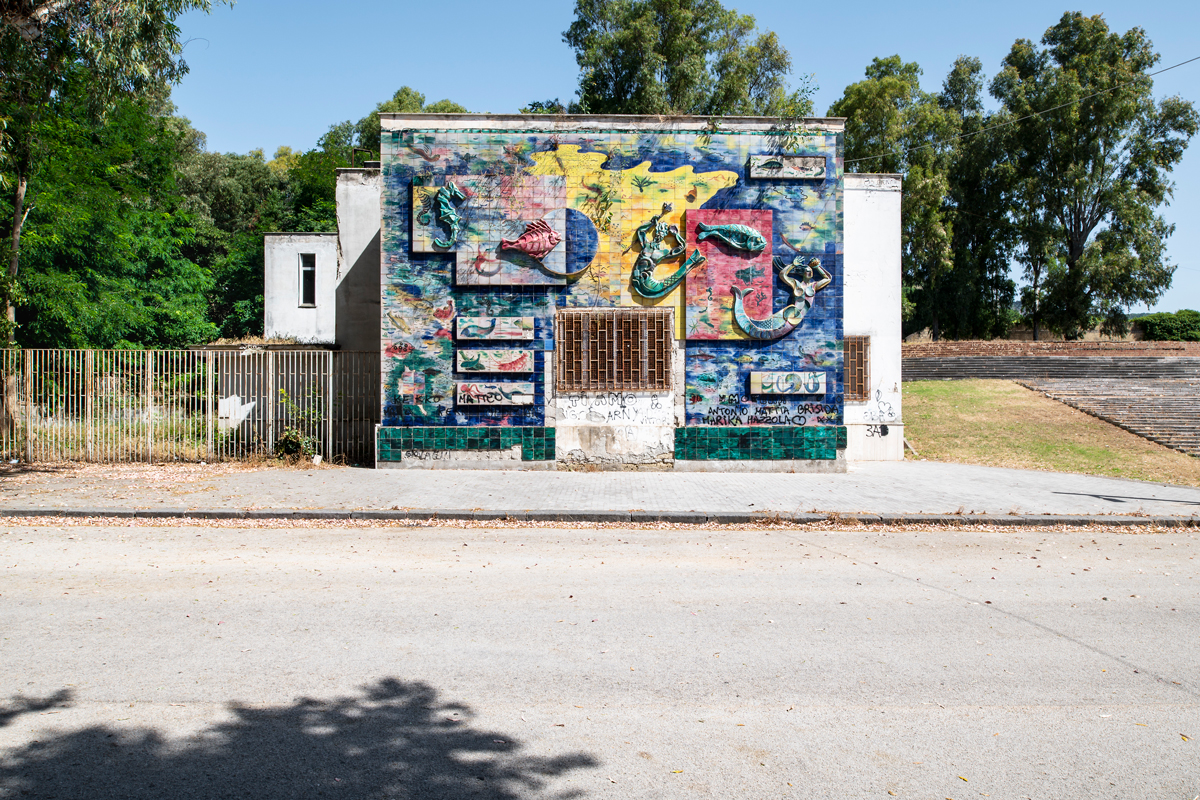
Main elevation decorated with Posillipo ceramics

=== Tropical aquarium ===
Designed in 1938 by Carlo Cocchia, already author of the restaurant and the greenhouses, it constituted the expansion of the historic aquarium on the Riviera. It was conceived as one of the heads of the north entrance of the exhibition, Cocchia endowed the building with a sculptural note emphasized by the ceramic façade painted with three-dimensional elements. An absolutely new effect in the neapolitan architectural panorama, the ceramic decoration was entrusted to the ceramist Paolo Ricci, exponent of the so-called Posillipo ceramics. The interior was characterized by the rationality of the paths that visitors had to follow. Currently the building is distorted by some elements, for example the main entrance has been transformed into a simple window, losing the access stairs, the travertine ornaments, the front access and the original fixtures; the current function is no longer that of an aquarium.

=== Arena Flegrea ===
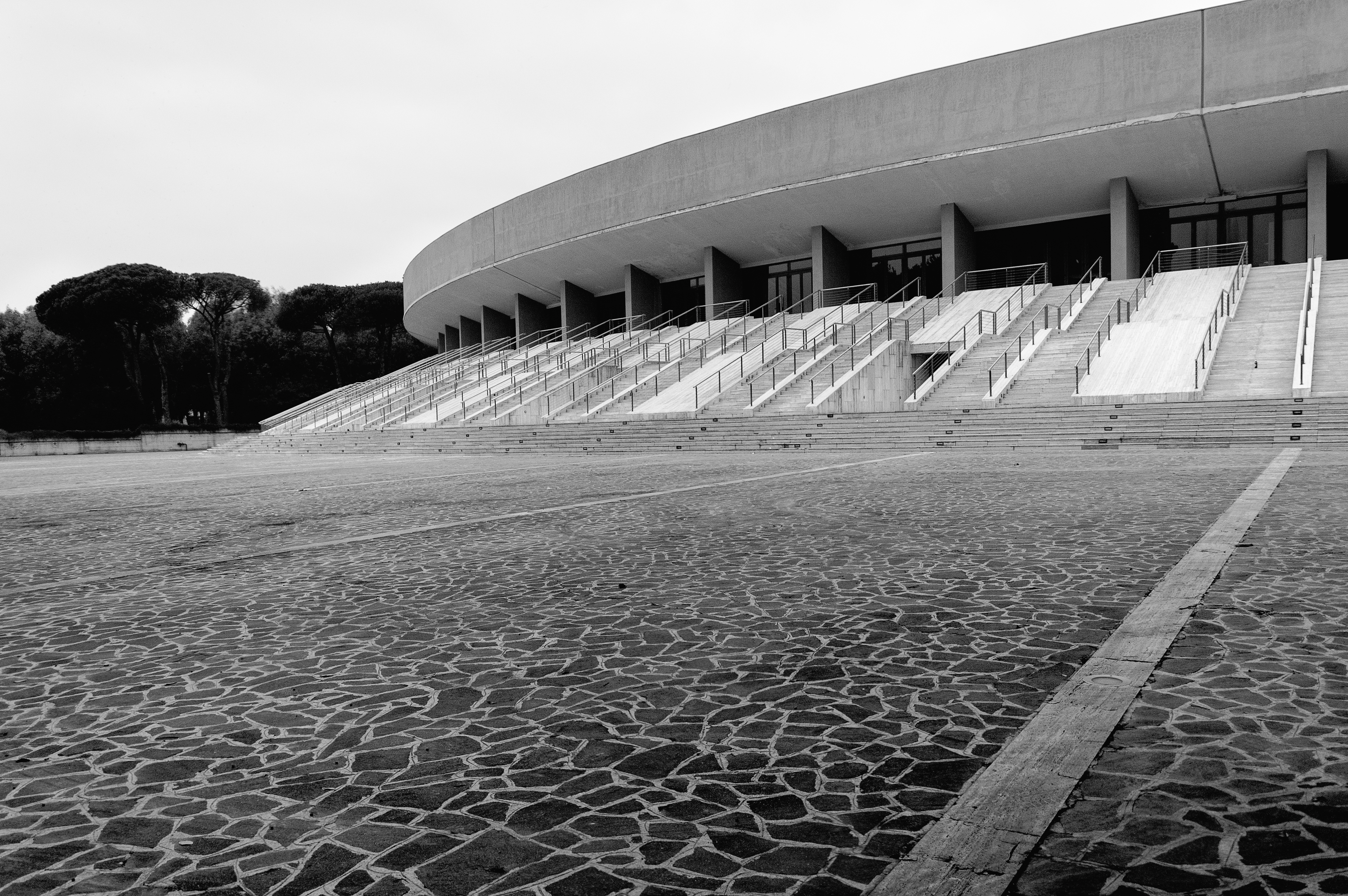
Prospectus of the Arena

It is one of the best works of the exhibition. It is the first permanent construction of an open theater capable of holding a large mass of spectators, about 12,000. It plays a decisive role for neapolitan rationalist architecture, as it can be considered the first work with rational intentions. It was designed and built between 1938 and 1940, at the age of only twenty-six, by Giulio De Luca who was inspired by the architectural models of Greek and Roman theaters scattered around Magna Graecia. De Luca was able to master his skills as a designer attentive to the problems of an open theater, managing to solve the complex problems of acoustics and visibility of the auditorium by playing on the section and on the internal elevation, creating an interaction of remarkable interest between landscape and architecture. The structure, as a whole, is in counter-slope, this means that the reading of its front is canceled, which is reduced to the crowning pediment. The access level rises eight and a half meters from the ground level and above, a peristyle of pilotis supporting the long curved pediment, 114 meters long, decorated with a mosaic by Nicola Fabbricato. After the Second World War it was damaged, like all the structures of the complex, and subsequently restored for opening in 1952. Over time it fell into decay again due to poor maintenance and the post-earthquake emergency that worsened the conditions. decided in 1989, in agreement with the designer, to demolish the old arena and build a similar one with acoustic and visual improvements. The new arena, bare of the mosaic on the façade, was inaugurated in 2001 with a Bob Dylan concert. In 2015, with a rent of 50,000 euros per year and a percentage of the proceeds, the entrepreneur Floro Flores was awarded the management of the Flegrea Arena for twelve years. Following extensive renovations, from the following summer it hosts the Noisy Naples Fest review which, for the 2018 edition, will bring in concert in Naples, among others, international artists of the caliber of Noel Gallagher with Noel Gallagher's High Flying Birds and Sting.

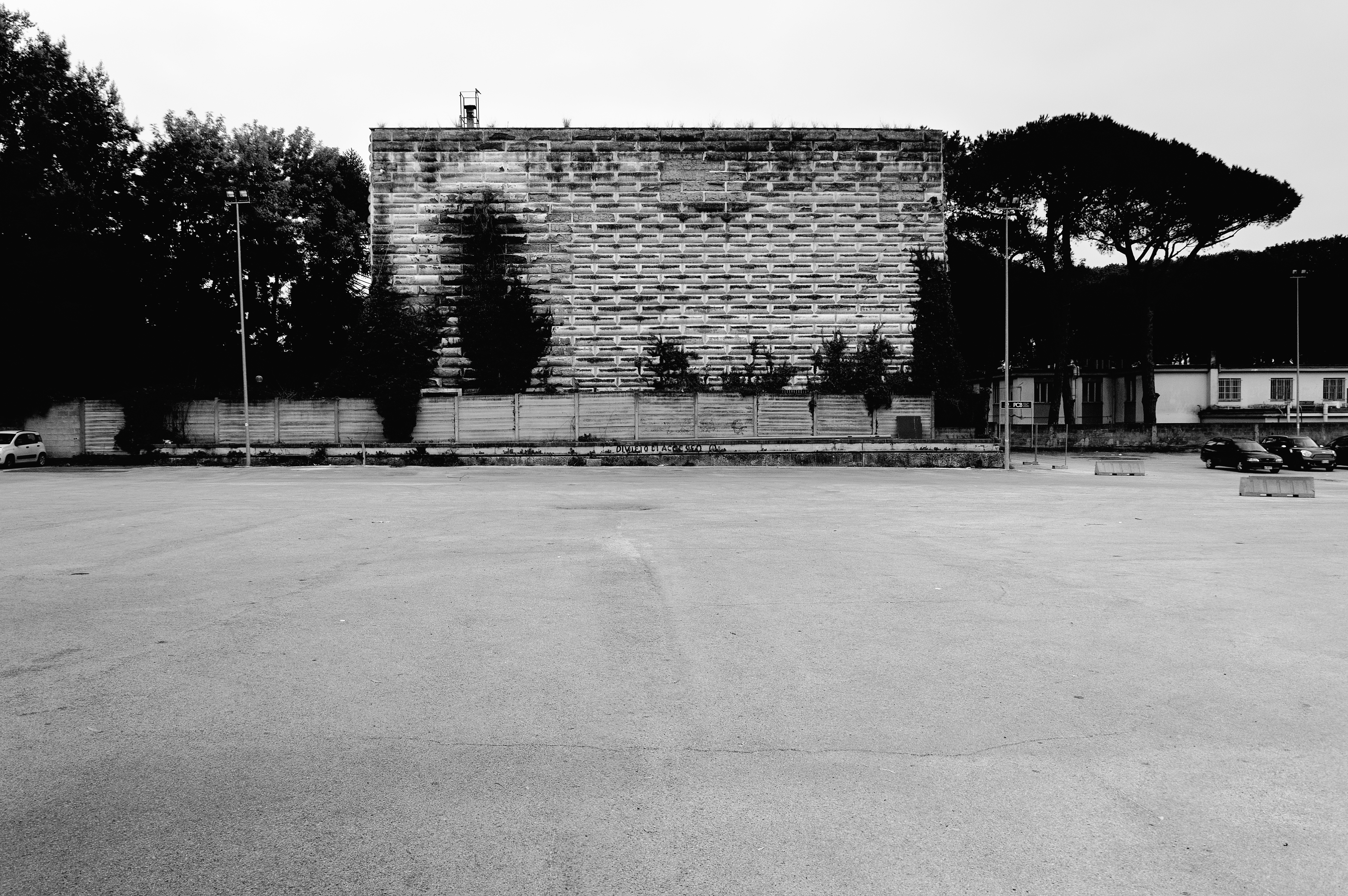
View of the Pavilion of Albania

=== Pavilion of Albania ===
Designed in 1938 by architects Gherardo Bosio and Nicolò Berardi, it is characterized by an architecture that is inspired by the Albanian fortress house. The façade, now tampered with, was conceived as a two-dimensional ashlar front that frames the insertion of the central pillared element on three levels that houses the loggia and the front portch. The pavilion was recovered in 1952 with the interior design by Luigi Cosenza. It is currently in disuse and is attacked by vegetation that has grown wild enough to prevent access and has favored an acceleration of the degradation of the pavilion.
