= Aulis Blomstedt =

Finnish architect

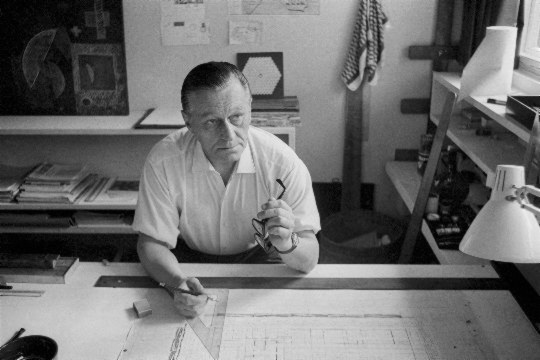
Blomstedt in 1966

Yrjö Aulis Uramo Blomstedt (28 February 1906 – 21 December 1979) was a Finnish architect and professor of architecture at the Helsinki University of Technology. He was a renowned modernist architect and architectural theoretician in the decades following the Second World War. Blomstedt was born into an architect family: his father Yrjö Blomstedt was an architect known for his National Romantic Jugend architecture, while his older brother Pauli E. Blomstedt was, until his premature death at the age of 35, a pioneering early modernist architect. His other brother, Jussi Jalas (formerly Armas Jussi Veikko Blomstedt), was a composer. Blomstedt was married to Heidi Blomstedt, the daughter of the composer Jean Sibelius. They had two children, the artist Juhana Blomstedt and the architect Severi Blomstedt.

== Life and career ==
Blomstedt spent his childhood in the city of Jyväskylä, and attended the same school as the renowned architect Alvar Aalto. From 1924 to 1930 Blomstedt studied architecture at Helsinki University of Technology. After qualifying he worked in various architects' offices before establishing his own office in 1945. He was appointed Professor of Architecture at Helsinki University of Technology in 1958, a position he held until 1972. In 1972 he was briefly a visiting professor at Washington University in St. Louis, USA. Blomstedt's position in Finnish architecture history is seen as the chief proponent of a highly rational modernist architecture, in sharp distinction to the more organic architecture of the chief figure in Finnish architecture, Alvar Aalto. To that end, Blomstedt was intrigued by architecture theory and building standardization, for which he proposed a number of highly elaborate proportional systems based on musical harmonics, the best known of which was the so-called Canon 60. One of his drawing analyses on harmonic proportions from 1973 was adopted as the logo of the Museum of Finnish Architecture. Many of Blomstedt's theoretical writings were published in the journal Carré Bleu, which he had co-founded in Helsinki in 1958, with Finnish architects Keijo Petäjä and Reima Pietilä, Finnish architecture historian Kyösti Ålander, and French architect André Schimmerling, whom together formed the CIAM Helsinki group, the Finnish group associated with CIAM (Congrès Internationaux d'Architecture Moderne).

== Key works by Aulis Blomstedt ==
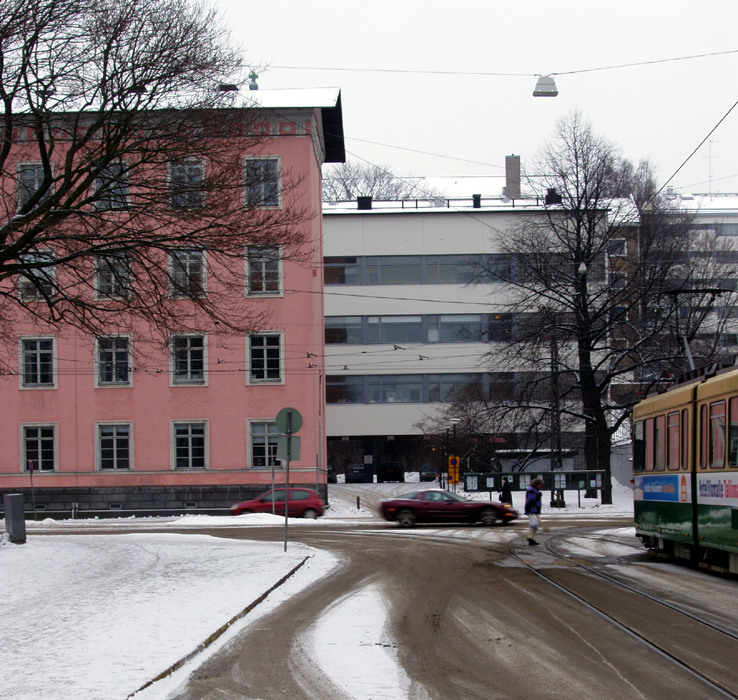
Finnish Language Workers' Institute, Helsinki, 1927 and extension by Aulis Blomstedt, 1959.

- Finnish Language Workers' Institute Annex, Helsinki (1954–59)
- Ketju and Kolmirinne residential buildings, Tapiola, Espoo (1954)
- Finnish Artists' Association studio terraced housing, Tapiola, Espoo (1955)
- Karhunpojat apartment blocks, Tapiola, Espoo (1957)
- Riistapolku apartment blocks, Tapiola, Espoo (1961)
