= Fountain of the Esedra =

Ornamental water fountain in Naples, Italy

Coordinates: 40.8276°N 14.1874°E

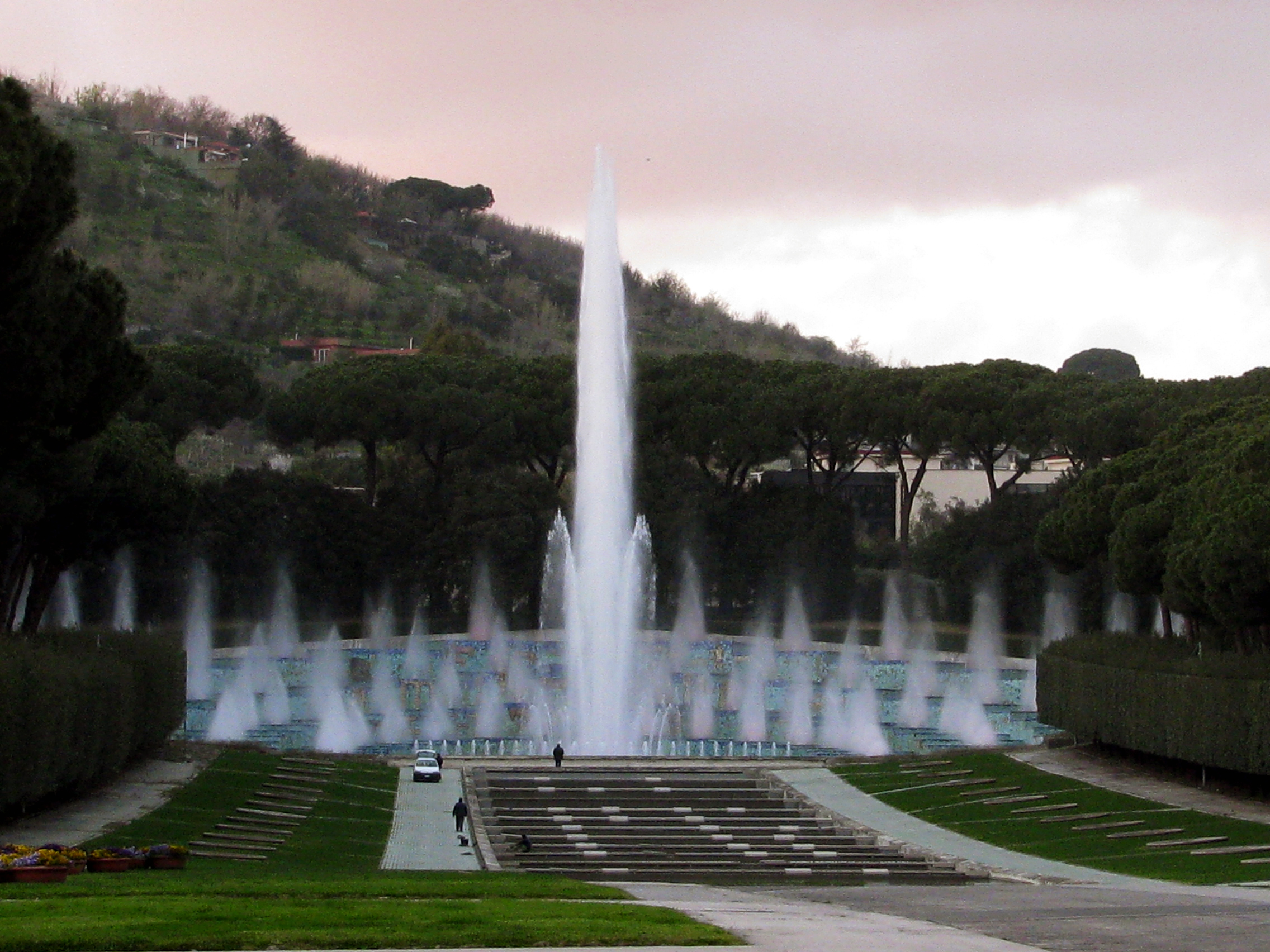
Frontal view of the Fountain of the Esedra.

The fountain of the Esedra is the largest fountain in Naples, Italy, in the vast architectural complex of the Mostra d'Oltremare.

== History ==
The fountain was designed in 1938 by two architects, Carlo Cocchia and Luigi Piccinato, and inaugurated in 1940. It was commissioned by the fascist regime, as it was to celebrate the Italian colonial policy. The inauguration was spectacular: the symphony "Fontane d'Oltremare" (composed by Guido Pannain) was performed and the water jets were synchronized with the music.

On May 23, 2006, after about 30 years of almost total abandonment and two and a half years of work that cost about six million euros, the fountain was restored and inaugurated again.

== Features ==
The structure, inspired by the eighteenth-century models of the fountain of the Royal Palace of Caserta, with its extension of 900 square metres (9,700 sq ft), it contains 4,000 cubic metres (140,000 cu ft) of water and emit jets up to 40 metres (130 ft) high. Around it is surrounded by 800 tall trees, especially pines and holm oaks. Currently the fountain counts 76 exedra basins, 1,300 nozzles made of brass and bronze, 12 cascading fountains and as many electric pumps. Thanks to about 800 projectors that emit lights of various colors and an audio system, the fountain is able to offer very suggestive shows. The decoration of the fountain, made in ceramic, is the work of Giuseppe Macedonio.

== Gallery ==
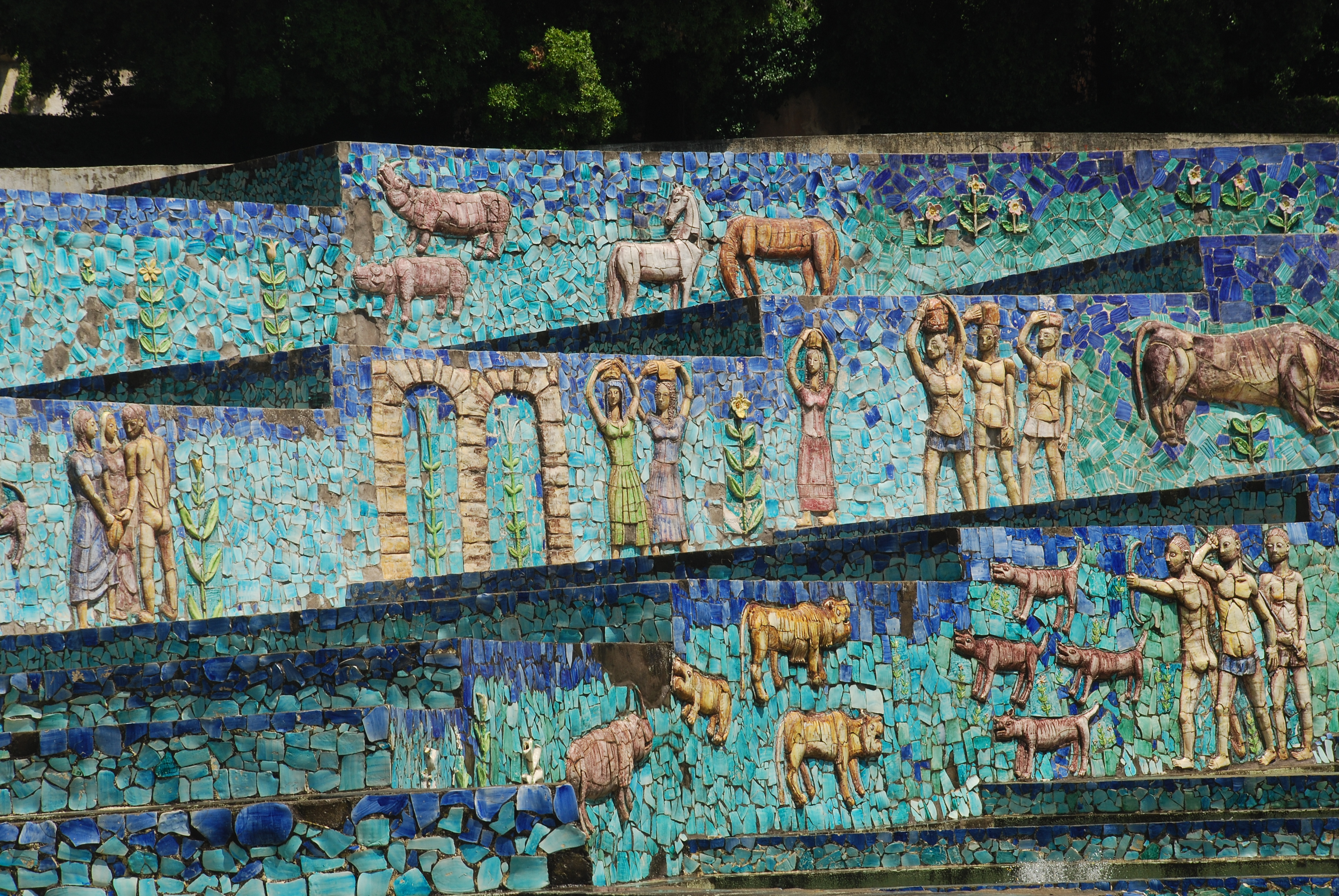
Decorations of mosaics found on the fountain

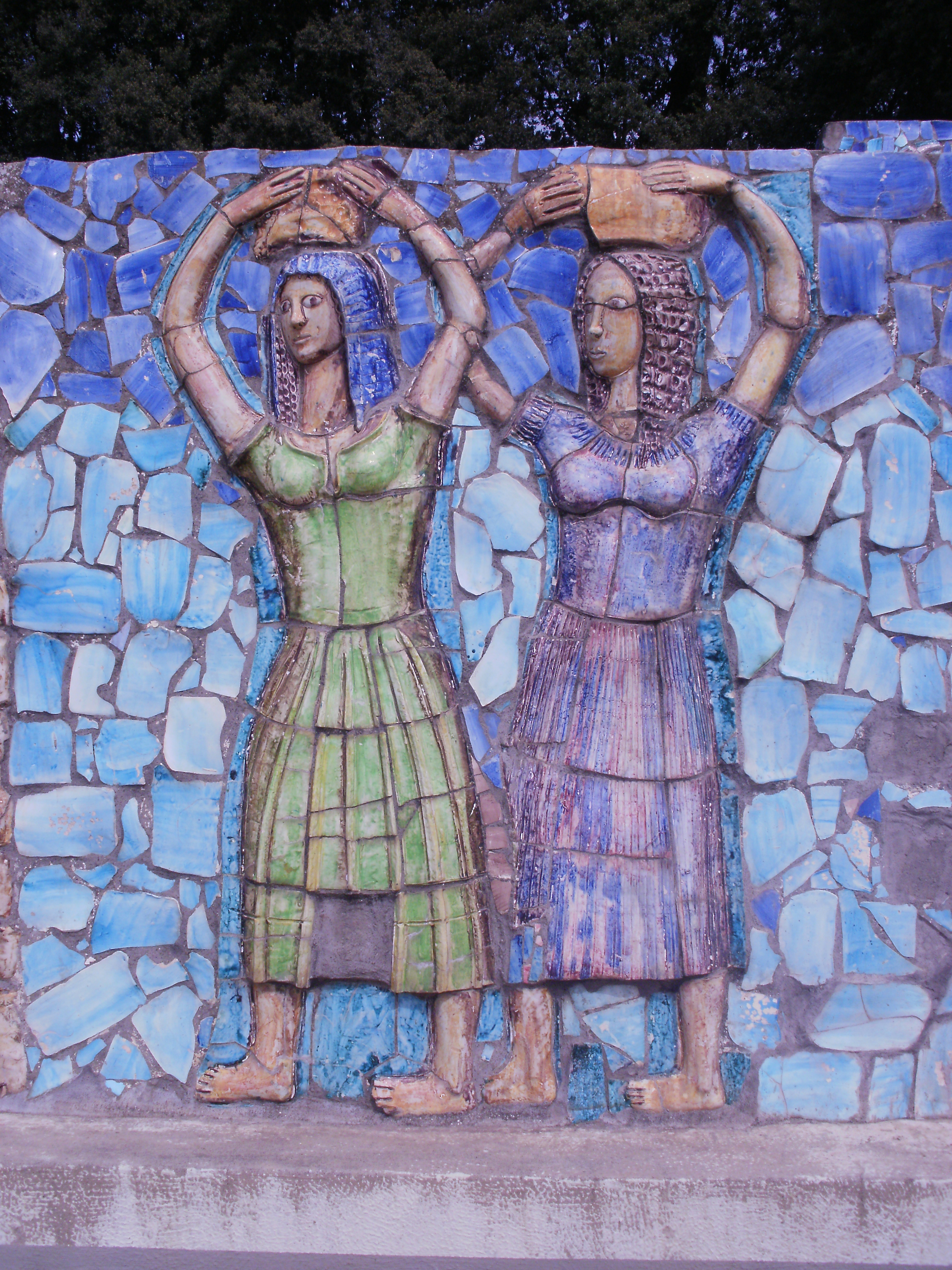
More zoomed mosaics

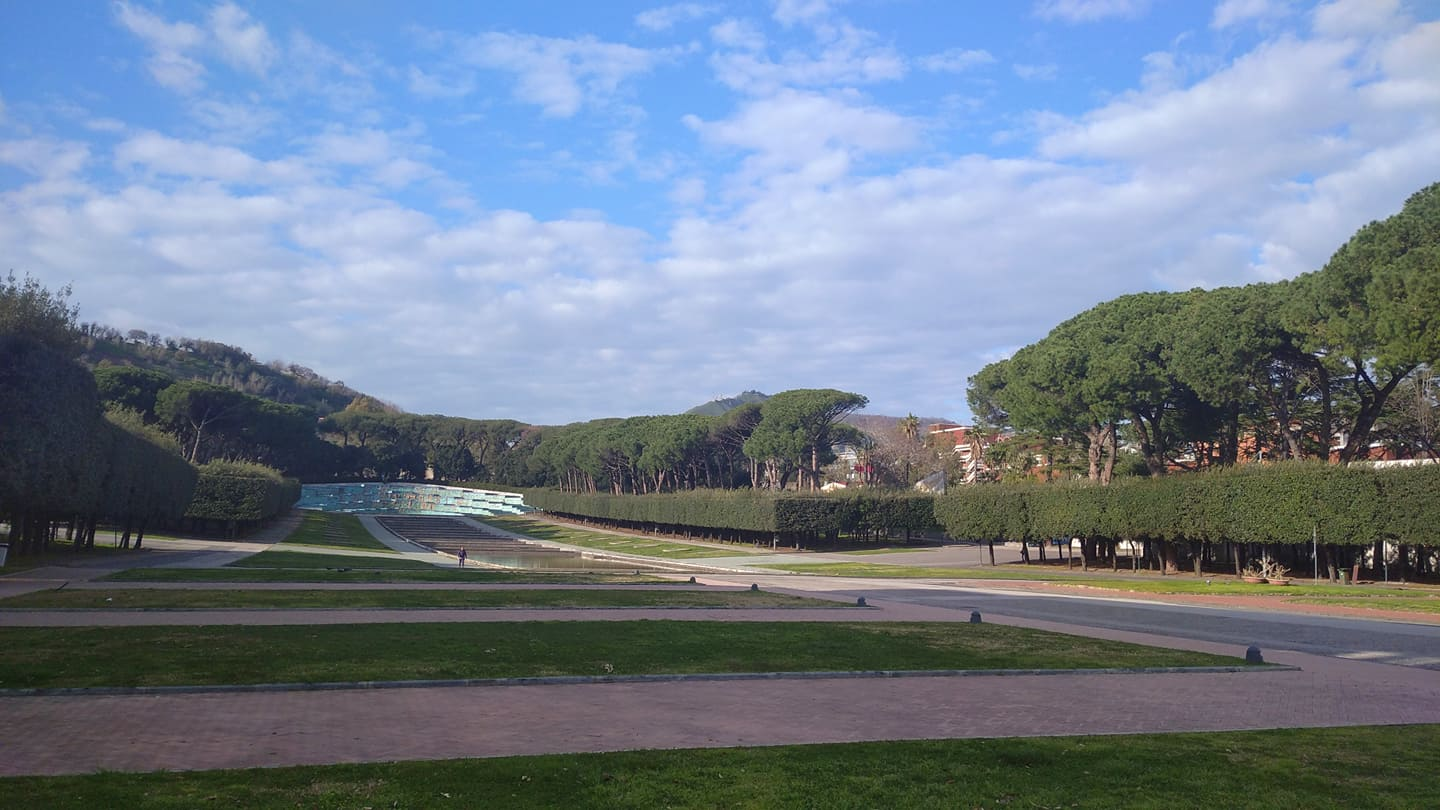
View of all the park

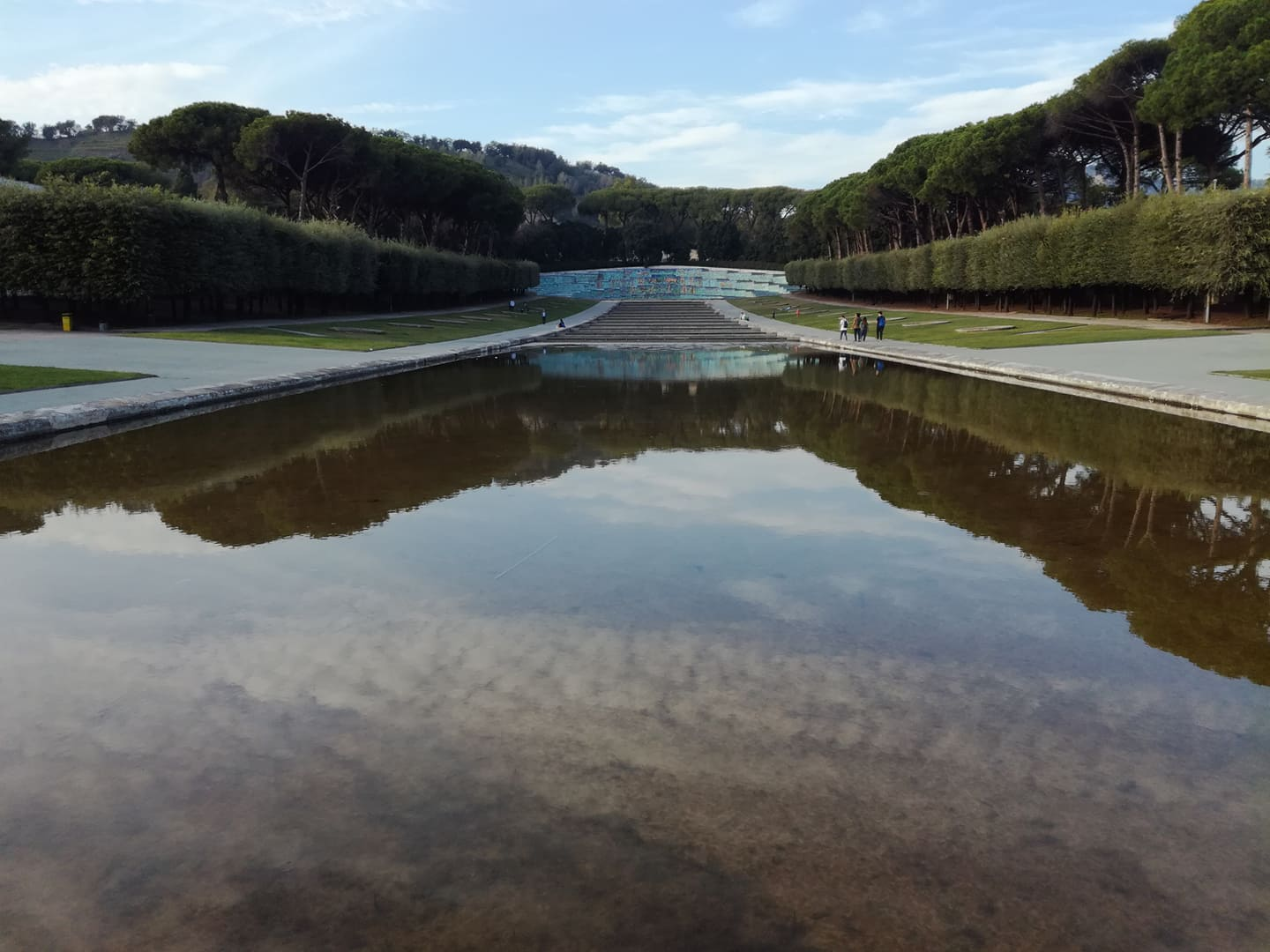
View of the river of the fountain
