= Heidi Blomstedt =

Finnish designer, ceramicist (1911–1982)

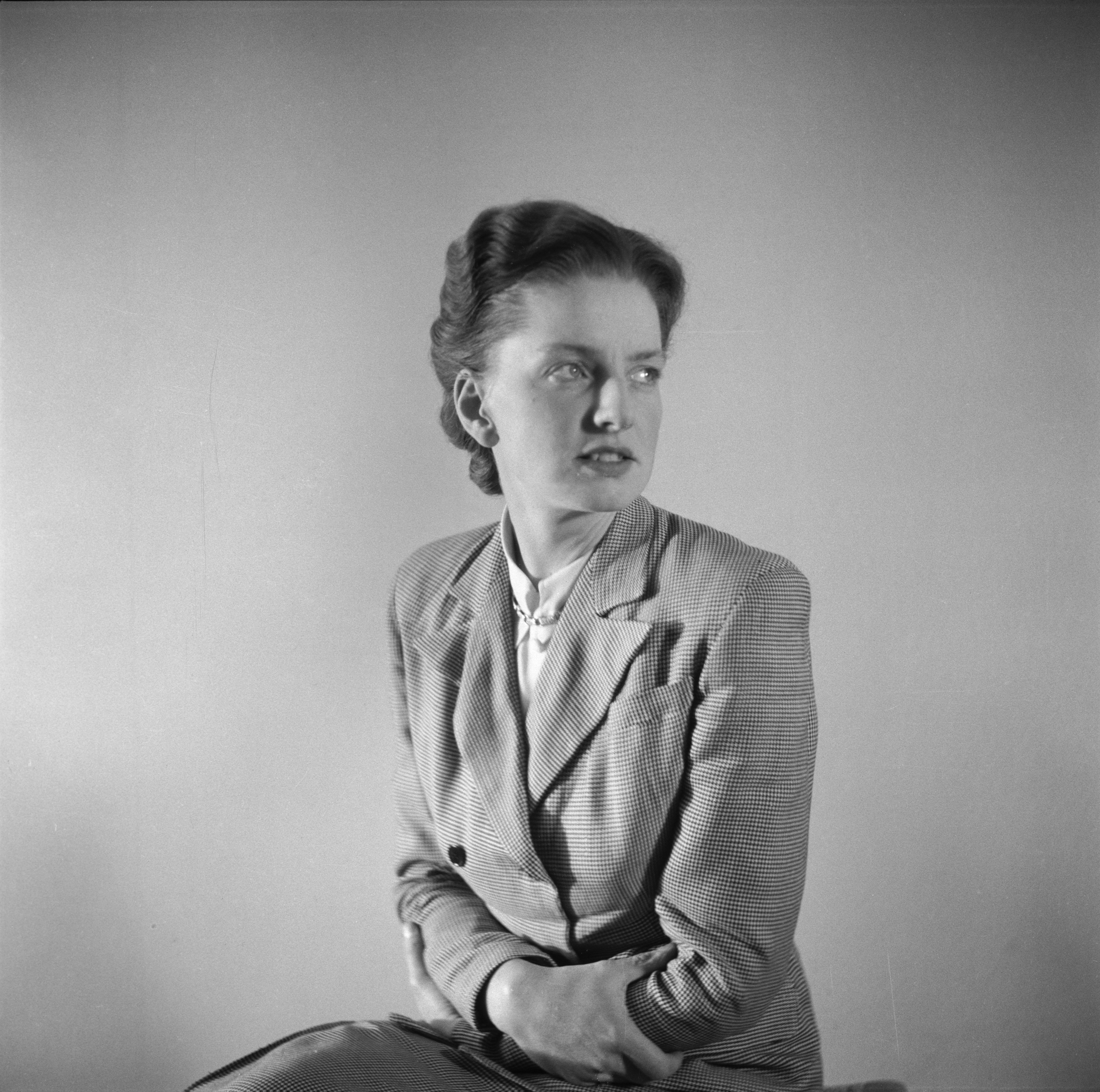
- Heidi Blomstedt, 1940
- Born: Heidi Sibelius; 20 June 1911; Järvenpää, Finland
- Died: 3 January 1982 (aged 70); Helsinki, Finland
- Known for: Ceramics, Design
- Spouse: Aulis Blomstedt

Heidi Kristina Blomstedt (née Sibelius; Järvenpää, 20 June 1911 – Helsinki, 3 January 1982) was a Finnish designer.

She began her education in Helsinki, and later continued her studies at the Ateneum School of Art.

She graduated in ceramics at the Taik School of Art and Design in 1932, and worked as a freelance ceramist and for the Arabia company.

She married the modernist architect and architectural theoretician Aulis Blomstedt, and they had four children: Juhana Blomstedt (1937–2010), Petri Blomstedt (1941–1997), Anssi Blomstedt (b. 1945) and Severi Blomstedt (b. 1946).

Her parents were the composer Jean Sibelius and Aino Sibelius.
