= The Carré Bleu =

Finland-based architecture publication

Le Carré Bleu, originally known as feuille internationale d'architecture ("International Folio of Architecture"), is an architecture publication founded in Helsinki, Finland, in 1958, published quarterly in three languages (English, French, Italian) and distributed internationally.

== History and profile ==
Following the final CIAM (International Congresses of Modern Architecture) congress, CIAM X, held in Dubrovnik in 1956, a CIAM Helsinki group met leading to the establishment of the magazine in 1958 to the birth of the journal of architecture theory Le Carré Bleu. The founding group consisted of the Finnish architects Aulis Blomstedt, Keijo Petäjä and Reima Pietilä, Finnish architecture historian Kyösti Ålander, and French architect André Schimmerling, who was then living in Finland. The first editions were published solely in French with rare English additions. The original headquarters of the magazine was in Helsinki. The production moved to Paris in 1963 and started publishing in French and in English before adding Italian in 2001.

Prominent international figures have contributed to the Carré Bleu and various projects presented and discussed in the CB were then realized: for example, the Freie Universität Berlin (Candilis, Josic, Woods); the university buildings in Urbino (by Giancarlo De Carlo); the Linear Centre, Rotterdam (Jacob B. Bakema); the Città della Scienza in Naples (Pica Ciamarra Associati).

In 1988, for the 30th anniversary of The Carré Bleu, the Industrial Creation Centre of the Centre Pompidou has published "L'Héritage des CIAM 1958/1988" ("The Legacy of CIAM 1958/1988"), with 24 slides of works created by the principal collaborators, and a presentation by André Schimmerling, Director of the folio between 1958 and 2003.

From 1994 to 1997, after a series of interviews – "The Architect and the Power" – held at the Finnish Institute of Paris [5], the CB has promoted the creation of the "Observatoire international de l'Architecture" (O.I.A., International Observatory Architecture ) which in 1997 established the project "Directive Européenne pour l'Architecture et le cadre de vie" (European Directive for Architecture and the Living).

In May 1999, Le Carré Bleu organized within faculties and schools of architecture a European debate on the theme "Mobility and Urbanity."

In 2001, the publication of Le Carré Bleu was interrupted for various reasons.

On the occasion of the exhibition "Team X 1953-1981" at the Centre Pompidou (24 September 2005 – 8 January 2006) and the "Utopia of the Present" one at the Netherlands Architecture Institute (NAI), Rotterdam, an overhaul of the Carré Bleu became necessary. A debate animated by Olivier Cinqualbre took place at the Pompidou Centre in January 2006 on the theme "Memory in Motion" after which the "new CB" published his "manifesto" called "Fragments / Symbiosis."

Between 2006 and 2009, under the patronage of UNESCO, the CB launched the "International Call for ideas - an idea for each city". The aim was to reward the best graduate students of Mediterranean countries, offering them paid internships in internationally known architecture firms.

In December 2008, Georges Edery organized an international symposium titled "Le Carré Bleu - 50 ans: mémoire et avenir" at the Cité de l'Architecture & du Patrimoine in the Palais de Chaillot, Paris. The conference proceedings were video recorded and published in a box double DVD ("Le Carré Bleu 50: 1958-2008 mémoire et avenir"). On this occasion, the Carré Bleu presented its draft "Declaration of Human Rights" in its relations to the habitat and lifestyles in their diversity.

Between 2009 and 2010, Georges Ederyet and François Lapied started meeting and decided to submit the complete Carré Bleu collection to the major French architectural library, the "Institut Français d’Architecture" (I.F.A.) situated inside the "Cité d’Architecture et du Patrimoine" in Paris.

After the n° 1/2011 "Formation des architectes, Alphabétisation des Citoyens" (Architects’ education, Literacy of citizens), with Bioarchitettura and INARCH, the CB organized in Florence, at Palazzo Vecchio, an International Conference called «Alfabetizzazione all’ecologia ed alla qualità dell’architettura» ("Ecology and quality of architecture literacy").

In 2012, the "Cité de l'Architecture et du Patrimoine", Paris, in cooperation with the "Grande Bibliothèque Nationale François Mitterrand", supervised the digitalization of the whole collection of Carré Blue, starting from n. 0/1958 (available on the Internet and, from 2013, also on www.lecarrebleu.eu texts constantly updated).

From 20 December 2013, the MAMT (Museum of Mediterranean Art, Music and Traditions in Naples, piazza del Municipio) dedicates a permanent space to the Carré Bleu, with a presentation of videos and photos.

== Editorial staff and directors ==
Founders: Aulis Blomstedt, Reima Pietilä, Keijo Petäjä, Kyösti Ålander, André Schimmerling. First Cercle de Rédaction (1958): Aulis Blomstedt, Eero Eerikäinen, Keijo Petäjä, Reima Pietilä, Simo Sivenius, André Schimmerling, Kyösti Ålander; Editor in Chief: Keijo Petäjä; Gérante (manager): Tyyne Saastamoinen-Schimmerling. Collaborators: Argentina: G. Cluzellas; Denmark: Arne Jacobsen; France: Roger Aujaume; Italy: Giancarlo De Carlo; Morocco: Elie Azagury; Norway: Sverre Fehn; Sweden: Sven Ivar Lind. From 1958 to 2003, Director André Schimmerling; from 1986 to 2001 A. Schimmerling, Philippe Fouquey Co-Responsibles; from 2006 to 2018 Luciana De Rosa Editor in Chief Current Cercle De Rédaction (2018): Kaisa Broner-Bauer, Georges Edery, Päivi Nikkanen-Kalt, Juhani Katainen, Pierre Lefevre, Massimo Locci, Luigi Prestinenza Puglisi, Livio Sacchi, Bruno Vellut, Jean-Yves Guegan. Director from 2006: Massimo Pica Ciamarra.

== Bibliography ==
- Pietilä, Reima, "Le Carré Bleu: 1983 Anniversary", Arkkitehti 79 :7 (1982): 65-66
- André Schimmerling, "L’Heritage des CIAM 1958/1988", CCI Centre Pompidou 1988.
- Alison Smithson, "On Carré Bleu and Team 10", <Spazio e Società> vol.12 n°45 January/March 1989 / p. 100-108
- André Schimmerling, "Le Carré Bleu: Trent'anni di idee, progetti, proposte", "L'Architettura, cronache e storia » maggio 1989, pgg. 355-375
- Alexandre Tzonis, Liane Lefaivre: "40 ans Carre Bleu : de Shadrach Woods vers la nouvelle génération", Le Carré Bleu 3-4/1998, pgg. 4-43
- Boltz, Thorsten, « Le Carré Bleu is forty years old, a tribute from a philosopher », Le Carré Bleu 1/1999 pgg. 34-35
- Catherine Blain, « Le Carré bleu. A Brief History of the Journal, its Editorial Policy and its Relationship to Team 10 (1958-2001)" in <Team 10, 1953-1981. In Search of a Utopia of the Present, 80-81>, edited by Max Risselada and Dirk Van den Heuvel. Rotterdam, NAi Publishers, 2005
- Luigi Prestinenza Puglisi, "Intervista a Massimo Pica Ciamarra su Le Carré Bleu", PresT-Letter n°27/2006
- Cristiana Chiorino, "15.000 battute fanno una rivista", Il Giornale dell’Architettura n°45 - novembre 2006
- A la suite du colloque sur « Le Carré Bleu - 50 ans / mémoire et avenir » à la Cité de l’Architecture et du Patrimoine - Palais de Chaillot / Paris, 08.12.2008 Georges EDERY a produit, sous forme de double DVD, les « Actes du Colloque sur le Cinquantenaire du CB ».

== Notes ==
1. TEAM 10 1953-81 - in search of a Utopia of the present, pg.81
2. L'architettura Cronaca e Storia, xxxv pg. 365
3. L'architettura Cronaca e Storia, xxxv pg. 367
4. Le Carré Bleu 3-4/1997
5. Le Carré Bleu n. 1/1996
6. Le Carré Bleu n. 3-4/1997
7. Le Carré Bleu n. 2/1998 e n. 2/1999
8. http://team10online.org
9. http://bioarchitettura.org; atti in <Costruire sostenibilità: crisi ambientale e bioarchitettura> a cura di W. Mitterer / G. Manella – Angeli ed. Milano 2013, pgg.144
10. http://portaildocumentaire.citechailot.fr%5B%5D
