= University of Molise =

Italian public university

Coordinates: 41.5562°N 14.6663°E

- Università degli Studi del Molise
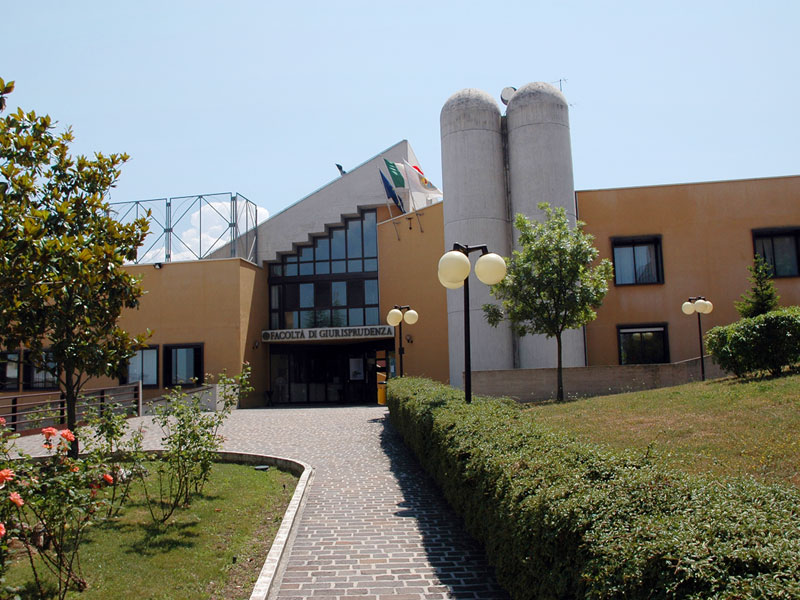
- University of Molise campus
- Motto: Scientific progress for the public utility
- Type: Public
- Established: 1982
- Affiliations: Cineca; EUA; UNIMED
- Rector: Prof. Luca Brunese
- Students: 7,177 (2017/18)
- Location: Campobasso, Pesche, Termoli, Molise, Italy
- Sporting affiliations: CUS Molise
- Website: unimol.it

The University of Molise (Italian: Università degli Studi del Molise), also known as UNIMOL, is an Italian public university located in Campobasso, Italy. It was founded in 1982 by the Law n.590 according to the plan for the development and institution of new universities; the campuses of this university are all set in the region of Molise and they are: in Campobasso (Headquarter), Pesche and Termoli.

== History ==
In the years 1982-1983 the University opened, but the only faculty was Agricultural Science, then with the opening of the faculties of Economics and especially of Law, the number of students grew. In 1993 new structures were opened in Isernia, including the faculty of Natural Sciences. Later on, Campobasso opened the Colozza Center, which has improved the quality and organization of the courses becoming nowadays a school for master's degrees in Secondary Education. Since 2000 the University increased the number of students and courses, establishing in 2006 the faculty of Medicine and Surgery, the youngest faculty of UNIMOL. Moreover, after a notice of competition issued by the University, was created the Scientific and Technological campus, which represents a link between research and the world of business. Today the University counts about 8,024 students.

=== Unimol Management Centre ===
"Unimol Management" provides highly specialising courses in the field of Public and Private Management. Its aims are the promotion and spreading of managerial and entrepreneurial culture in public and private sectors through the development, organisation and management of high-quality courses.

=== Colozza Centre ===
The aim of the specialisation Centre “Colozza” is specific professional training for prospective High School teachers. The didactical activities include not only mere teachings but also laboratory activities and traineeships aiming at the integration between theoretic knowledge and practical abilities. The centre offers the following diplomas:

- Curricula: Linguistic – Literary
- Natural Sciences
- Physics, Mathematics, Computer Sciences
- Economic – Judicial Sciences
- Sport Sciences

== Departments ==
The University is organised into six departments:

- Department of Agricultural, Environmental and Food Sciences
- Department of Economics
- Department of Humanities, Education and Social Sciences
- Department of Biosciences and Territory
- Department of Law
- Department of Medicine and Health Sciences

== University Centres ==
- Centre for Didactics and Informatic Research
- Centre of Molise Culture
- Centre of Documentation and Research on Scholastic Institutes, Scholastic Book and kids Literature History
- University Linguistic Centre
- Centre of formation on Aging Medicine
- International Research Centre for the Study and Prevention of Atopic Dermatitis and Psoriasis
- Legal Seminar Centre "Andrea d'Isernia"
- Microscopy Interdepartmental Services Centre
- Appenninic Centre of Studies
- Touristic Systems Study Center
- Laboratory for the Activities connected to the Territorial and Environmental Development
- Laboratory for the study of the relations between Companies, Institutions and Stocks

== See also ==
- List of Italian universities
- Campobasso
