= Riccardo Dalisi =

Italian architect and designer (1931–2022)

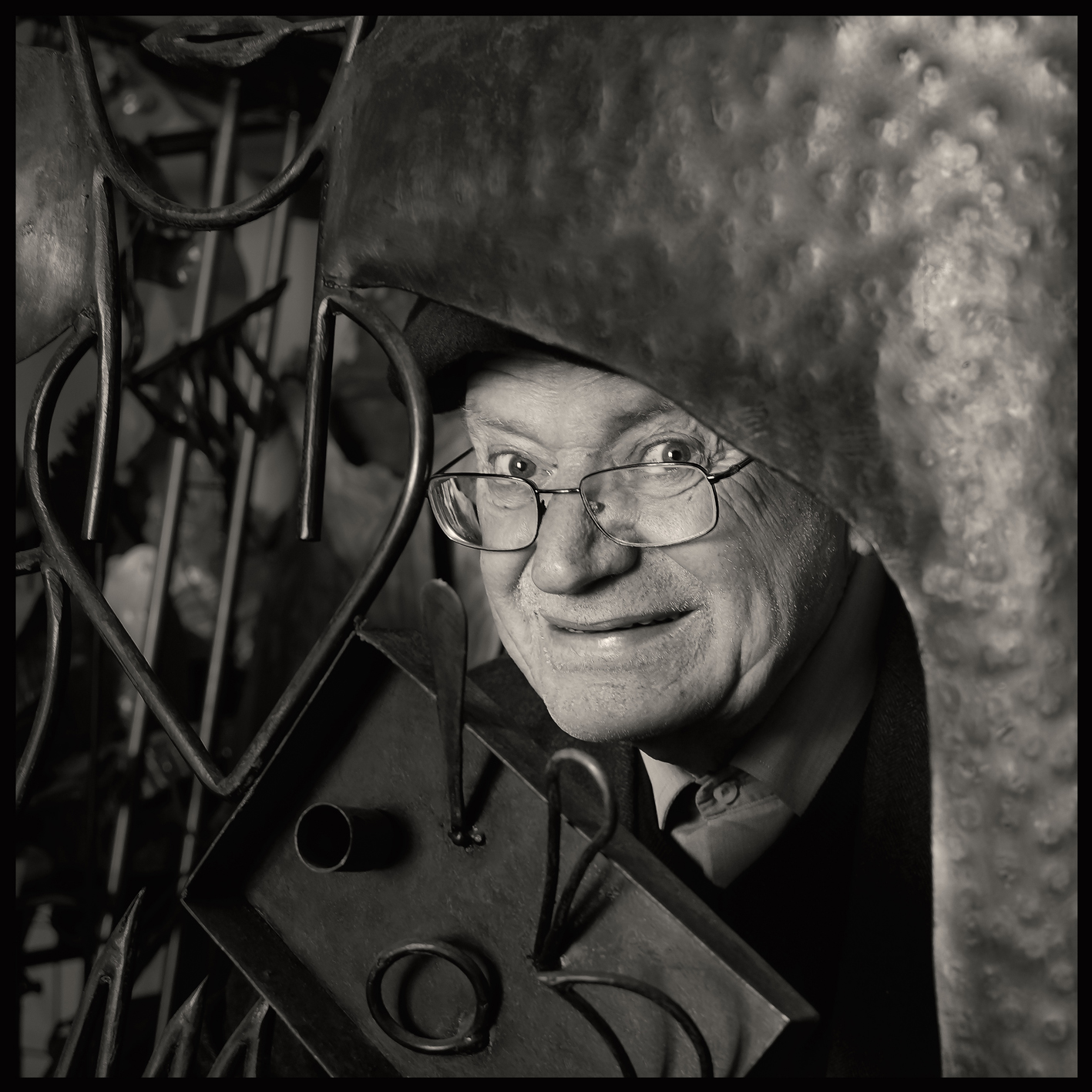
- Riccardo Dalisi, photographed by Augusto De Luca
- Born: 1 May 1931; Potenza, Italy
- Died: 9 April 2022 (aged 90); Naples, Italy
- Education: University of Naples Federico II
- Occupation: Architect

Riccardo Dalisi (May 1, 1931 – April 9, 2022) was an Italian architect, designer and artist.
