= Città della Scienza =

Coordinates: 40°48′20″N 14°10′29″E

Fondazione Idis-Città della Scienza
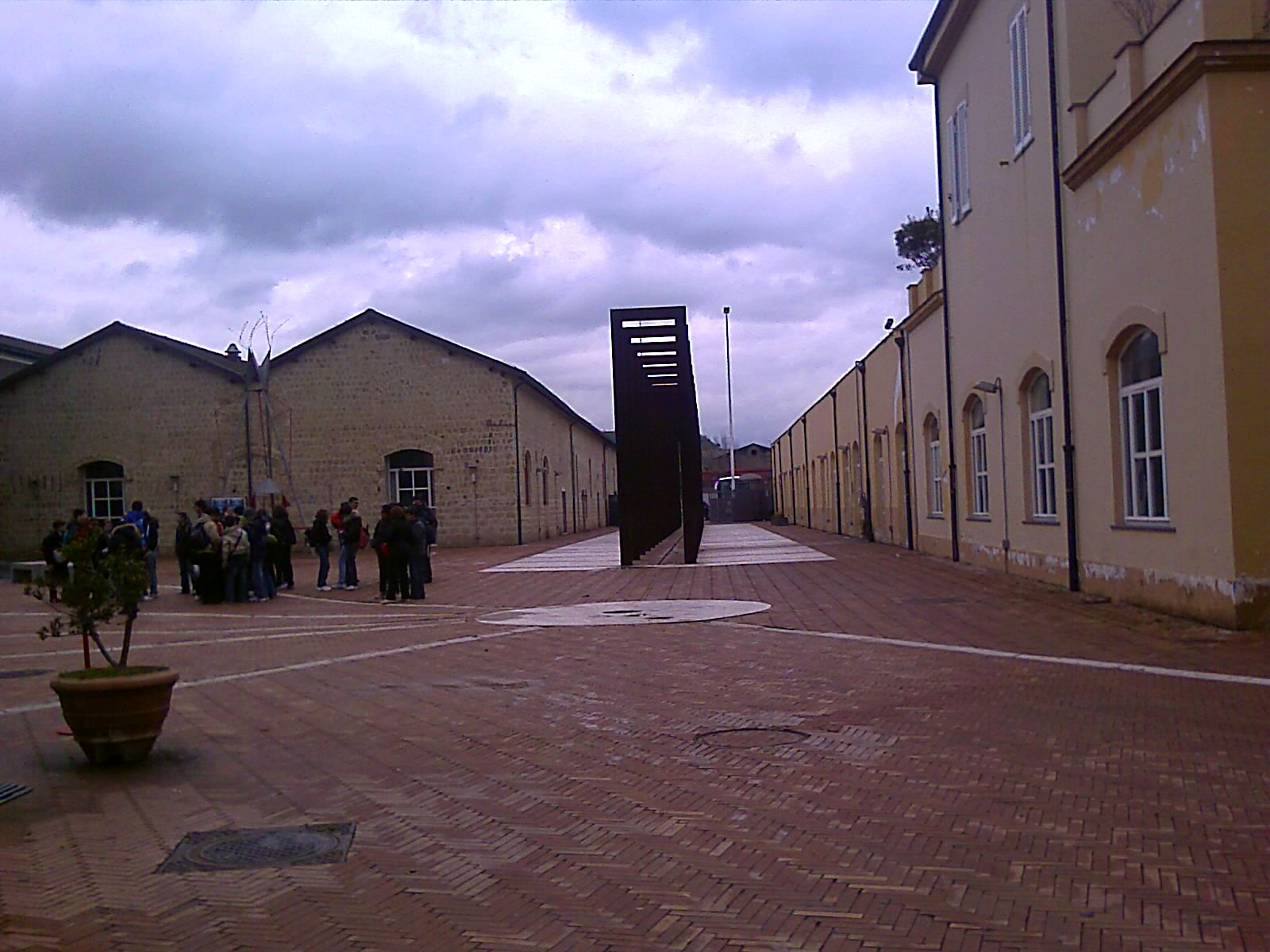
- Established: 1987–1996
- Location: Naples
- Type: Science museum
- President: Vittorio Silvestrini
- Curator: Maria Carolina Cortese

The Città della Scienza ("city of science") is a museum in Naples, in Campania in southern Italy. It was opened to the public in 1996 and features various areas where visitors can explore and learn about science, natural phenomena, and hosts a wide large number of science exhibits and culture events. The museum also promotes sustainable technologies activities and enterprises.

Its structures are located in Bagnoli, the ex industrial district in Naples, and its nucleus was built in a 19th-century workshops industry archeological site.

== History ==
The museum was built by a public-private foundation called "Fondazione IDIS" in 1985–1996. Città della Scienza grew to become one of the most visited museums of Naples and actually is included in the list of "NGOs in official relations" with UNESCO. The previous Science Centre has been destroyed during a fire arson on 4 March 2013. The science area for kids was the first to be rebuilt and it is actually open to public. Being de facto destroyed and almost non functioning, Città della Scienza foundation communicates with public thanks to Facebook, its website and Derev (for crowdfunding). Various initiatives (either public and private) were created to collect funding to rebuild completely the whole museum. In April a part of Science Center has been reopened to public.

There are three principal areas but, during the fire, the previous Science Centre was destroyed.:

- Science center, the first Italian scientific interactive museum. Now composed by: Corporea (traveling in the human body), 'The sea', children's workshop and a Planetarium
- Training and development
- Events area

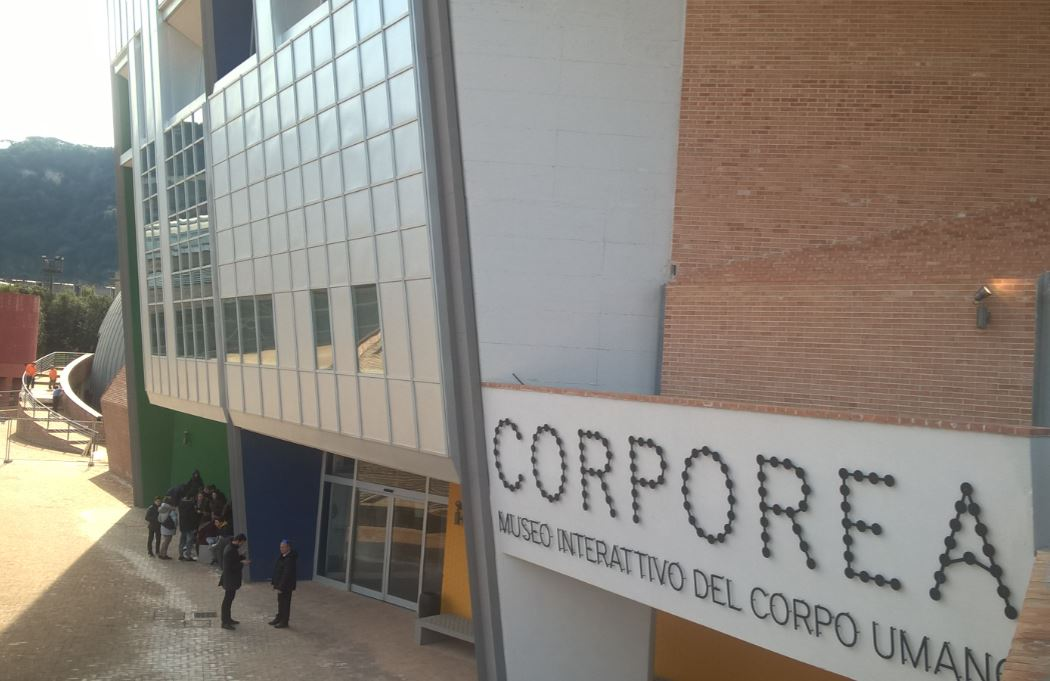

== Science Centre – Displaying sections ==
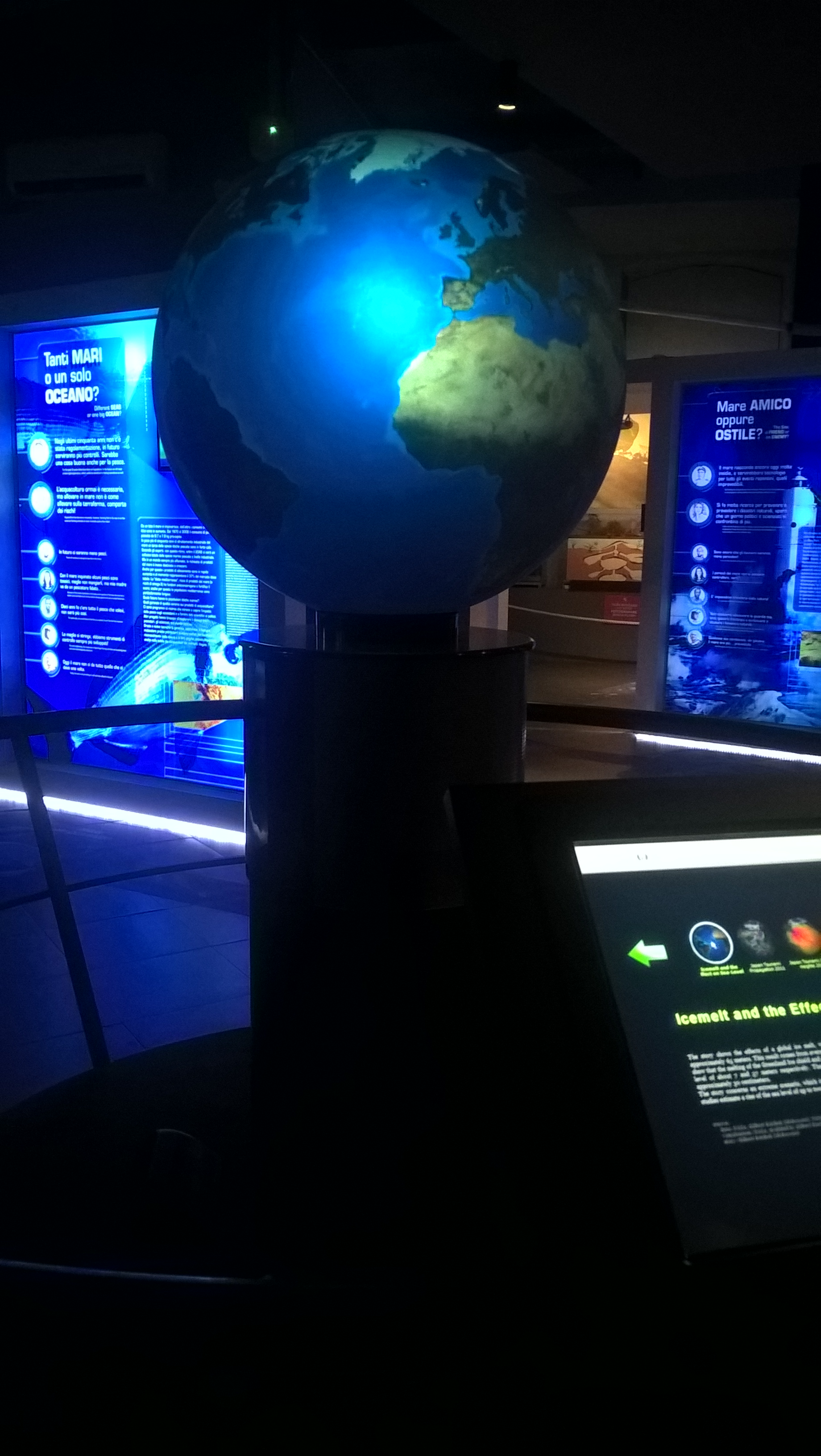

Now:

- Corporea. Human Body Museum
- Planetarium/Dome 3D
- The Sea
- The Children' s Workshop
- Laboratories: Bugs' house, GNAM (the Village of Mediterranean Diet and Biodiversity), Classrooms, Children FabLab, Reporteen School

In the old Science Center there were:

- Science Gym
- The Children's Workshop
- Planetarium
- Signs, Symbols and Signals
- Gnam
- Instruments of the past
- The art route

The Città della Scienza organizes events and temporary exhibits about various matters. The most important event is "Futuro Remoto", exhibits and meetings about science, discovery and society.

== See also ==
- List of science centers
