= Arenella =

Borough of Naples, Italy

Coordinates: 40.86589°N 14.2221°E

- Quarter of Naples
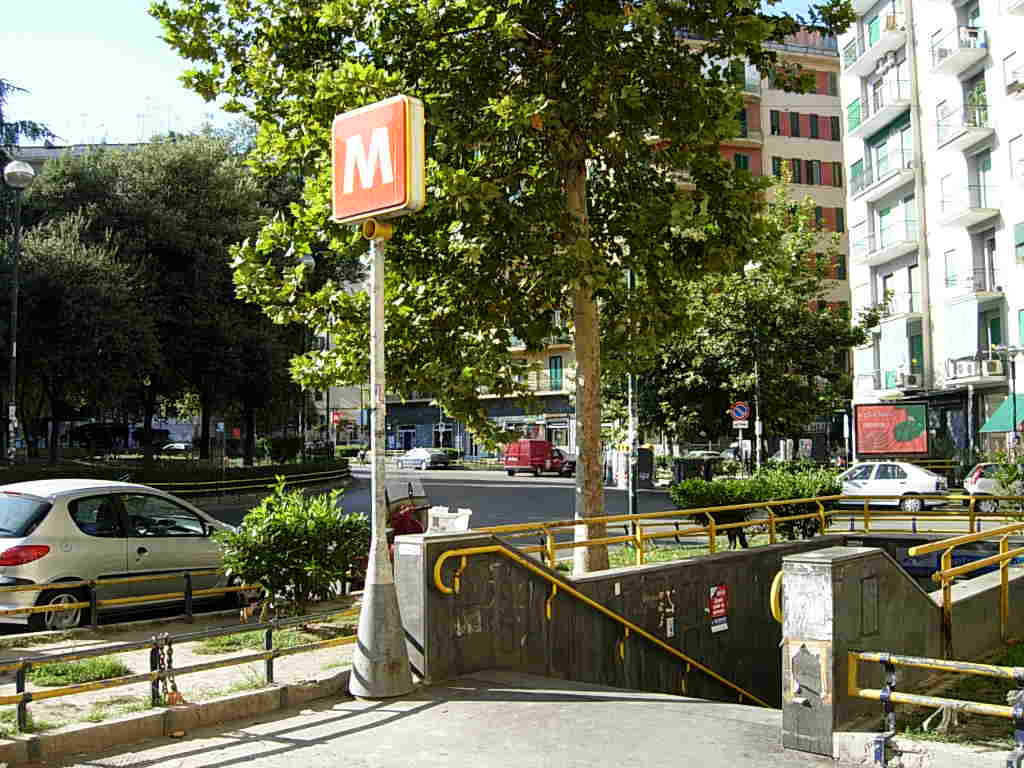
- Line 1 Subway Station Medaglie d'Oro, in Piazza Medaglie d'Oro.

- Location of Arenella within Naples
- Country: Italy
- Region: Campania
- City: Naples
- Municipalità: 5th

Area
  - Total: 5.25 km^{2} (2.03 sq mi)

Population
  - Total: 67.634
  - Density: 12.9/km^{2} (33.4/sq mi)
- Demonym: arenellesi
- Postal codes: 80128, 80129, 80131 and 80136

Arenella is a quarter of Naples, southern Italy. It is on the Vomero hill above the city and was, 300 meters in elevation. Many years ago was considered a place to go to "get away from it all". It is near to the main hospital section of the city, set somewhat higher, on the way up to the Hermitage of Camaldoli. It has some points of historic interest, such as the presence of the workshop of Giambattista della Porta.

== Etymology ==
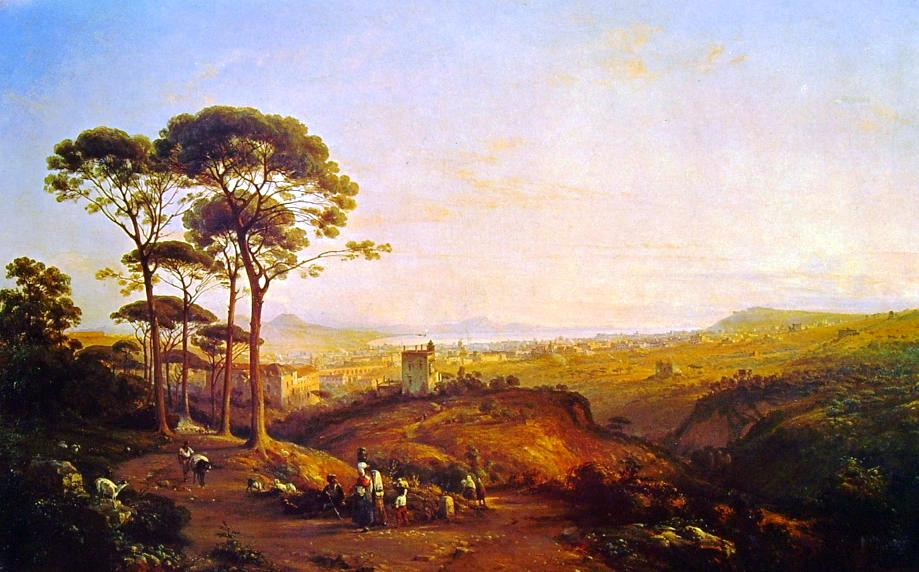
Teodoro Duclère - Naples from the Distaff (view of Colli Aminei and Arenella)

According to some sources, the origin of its name is probably to be linked to the fact that one of the ancient cores of this area, Piazzetta Arenella, near the modern Piazza Muzij, looked and still looks like a small arena, where in the past they held the most important meetings, markets and civil and religious events.

According to the canon Carlo Celano the denomination (in common with that of Arenaccia), is due to the sandy debris coming from the Camaldoli hill transported by rainwater.

In particular, before the 20th century in the hilly area of the city, then made up mostly of agricultural areas, the clearings present in the area were never or almost never called with the term of square or small square, but with the name of "largo" (such as for example largo Antignano, still existing) or "arena", whose district deformations are precisely those of Arenella and Arenaccia.

== Infrastructure and transport ==
In the district there are three exits of the Naples Bypass (Arenella, Hospital Area and Camaldoli, respectively exit n. 6, 7 and 8). Furthermore, one of the three junctions (via Pigna) of exit no. 9 (Vomero) is also actually in the Arenella district, as is the entrance to the ring road which, opened in the 1990s, allows vehicular traffic to arrive directly at Soccavo and Pianura avoiding going along via Epomeo (an often busy and vital connecting artery).
The district is served by the Medaglie d'Oro, Montedonzelli (via Francesco dell'Erba, via Pietro Castellino, via San Giacomo dei Capri), Rione Alto (located in the homonymous district) and Policlinico stations of Line 1 of the Naples Metro.
The main roads are: via Sergio Pansini, via Sant'Ignazio di Loyola, via Domenico Fontana, via San Giacomo dei Capri and via Pietro Castellino, via Pigna and via Gabriele Jannelli.
There are the normal urban and suburban bus lines.

== Bibliography ==
- Mimmo Piscopo, Vomero e dintorni: viaggio nella memoria di un vomerese accanito, Naples, Guida Editori, 2000, ISBN 978-8871884196.
- Antonio La Gala, Vomero. Storia e storie, Naples, Guida Editori, 2004, ISBN 978-8871888712.
- Vincenzo Vinciguerra, Dall’autenticità alla “McDonaldizzazione” di Napoli: Confronto tra storia e modernità di due realtà partenopee, PM edizioni, 2017, ISBN 978-8899565541.
