= Medaglie d'Oro =

Medaglie d'Oro could refer to:

== Places ==
- Medaglie d'Oro (Naples Metro)
- Medaglie d'Oro (Rome), in Municipio XIX
- Piazza Medaglie d'Oro, a square in Naples

== See also ==
- Medaglia d'Oro, the Gold Medal of Military Valour
- Medaglia d'Oro (horse) (foaled April 11, 1999), an American Thoroughbred racehorse
