= Rione Alto station =

Naples Metro station

Rione Alto
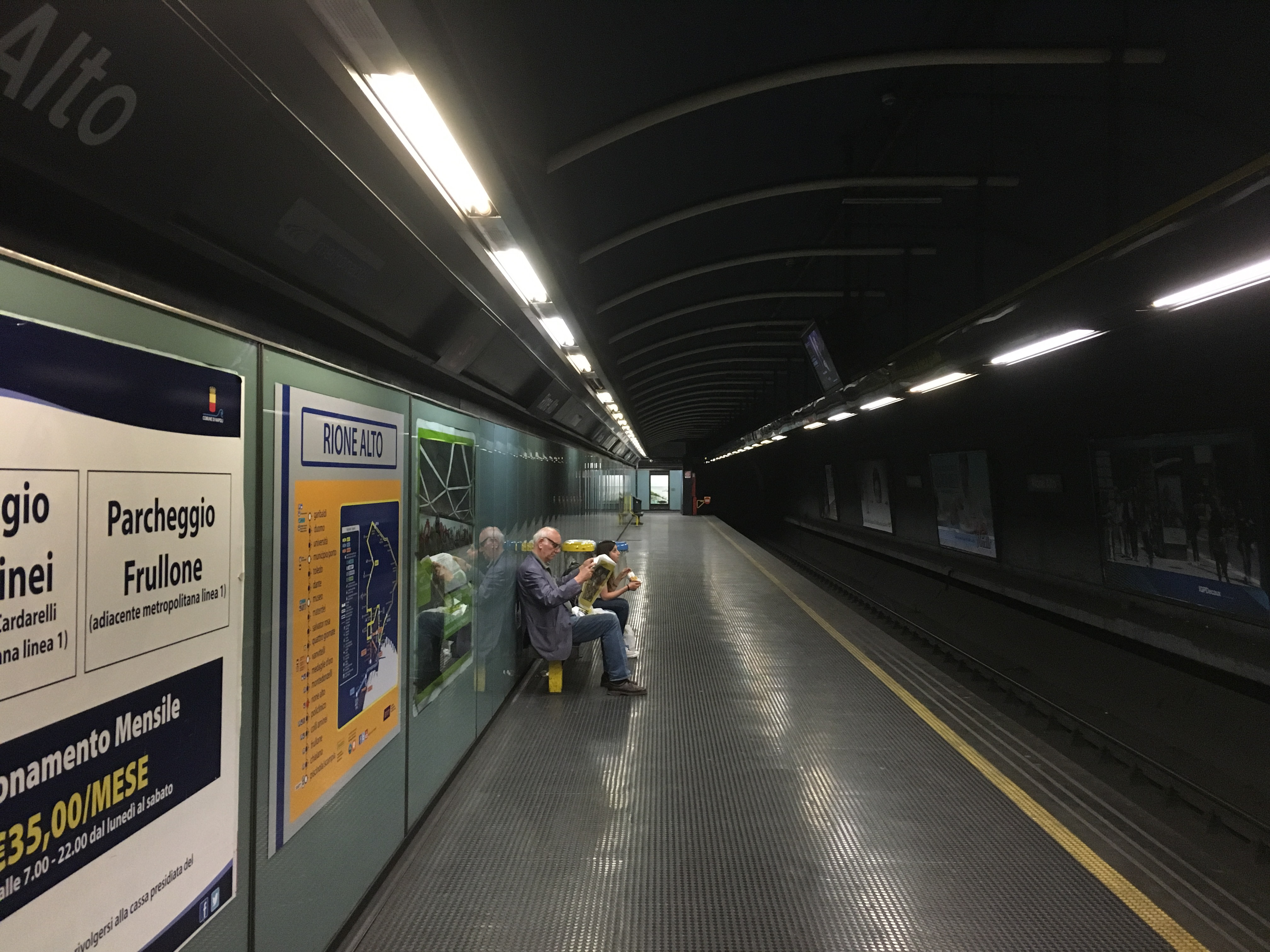

General information
- Coordinates: 40.8612°N 14.2205°E
- System: Naples Metro station
- Operator: ANM
- Line: Line 1

History
- Opened: 28 May 1993

Services
Preceding station	Naples Metro	Following station
Policlinico towards Piscinola Scampia	Line 1	Montedonzelli towards Centro Direzionale
Route map
Location

Rione Alto is a Naples Metro station that serves Line 1, located in the homonymous district. It opened on 28 May 1993 as part of the inaugural section of Naples Metro, between Vanvitelli and Colli Aminei. The station is located between Montedonzelli and Policlinico. It is part of the circuit of the art stations.

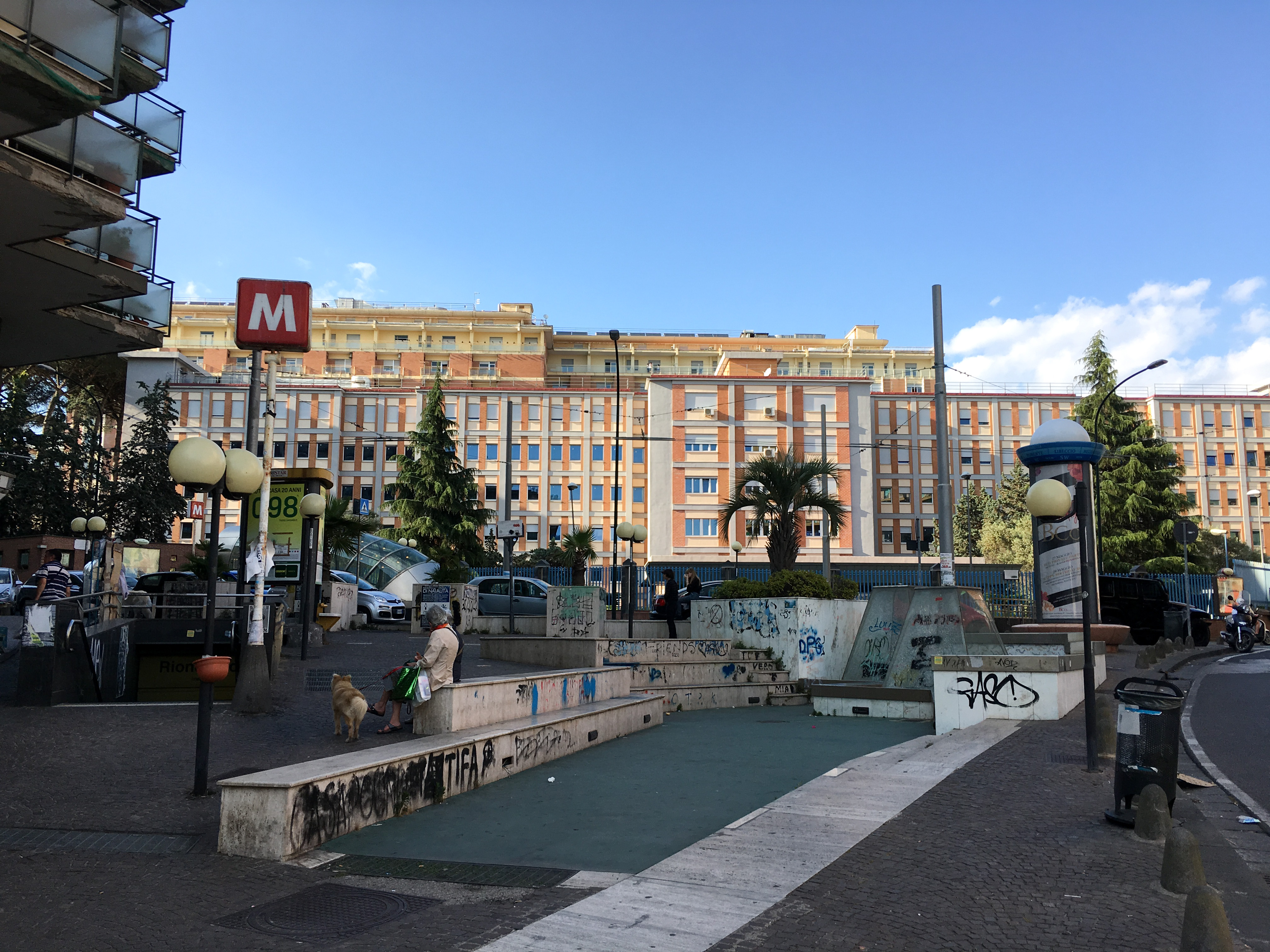
The entrance on via Domenico Fontana. Behind it, the Pascale hospital.

The main entrances are in Via Giulio Palermo, accompanied by a lift in Via Pasquale Del Torto, while further exits are in Via Mariano Semmola, Via Domenico Fontana and Via Antonino D’Antona. An exit also connects it to the nearby Pascale Hospital.

The section of the exit in via Semmola has entered the circuit of the art stations, inside there are installations by Antonio Tammaro and Achille Cevoli outdoors, while inside works by David Tremlet, Giuseppe Zevola, Bianco-Valente, Katharina Sieverding, Marco Anelli and various young artists.

== Services ==
The station has:

- Automatic ticket office

== Connections ==
- Bus stop

== See also ==
- Art Stations of the Naples Metro
