= Angelo Aniello Fiore =

Italian architect and sculptor

Angelo Aniello Fiore (died c.1500, Naples) was an Italian architect and sculptor. He was a contemporary of Gabriele d'Agnolo and Giovanni Francesco Mormando. He was born in Naples, and one of his pupils was Novello da San Lucano.
