= Vanvitelli =

Vanvitellii can refer to:

- Caspar van Wittel, painter of Baroque vedute
- Luigi Vanvitelli, prominent 18th-century Baroque and Neoclassical architect of Rome and Naples
- Piazza Vanvitelli, a public square in Vomero, Naples
- Vanvitelli (Naples Metro), a station on Line 1 of the Naples metro
