= Montedonzelli station =

Naples Metro station

Coordinates: 40°51′24″N 14°13′27″E

Montedonzelli
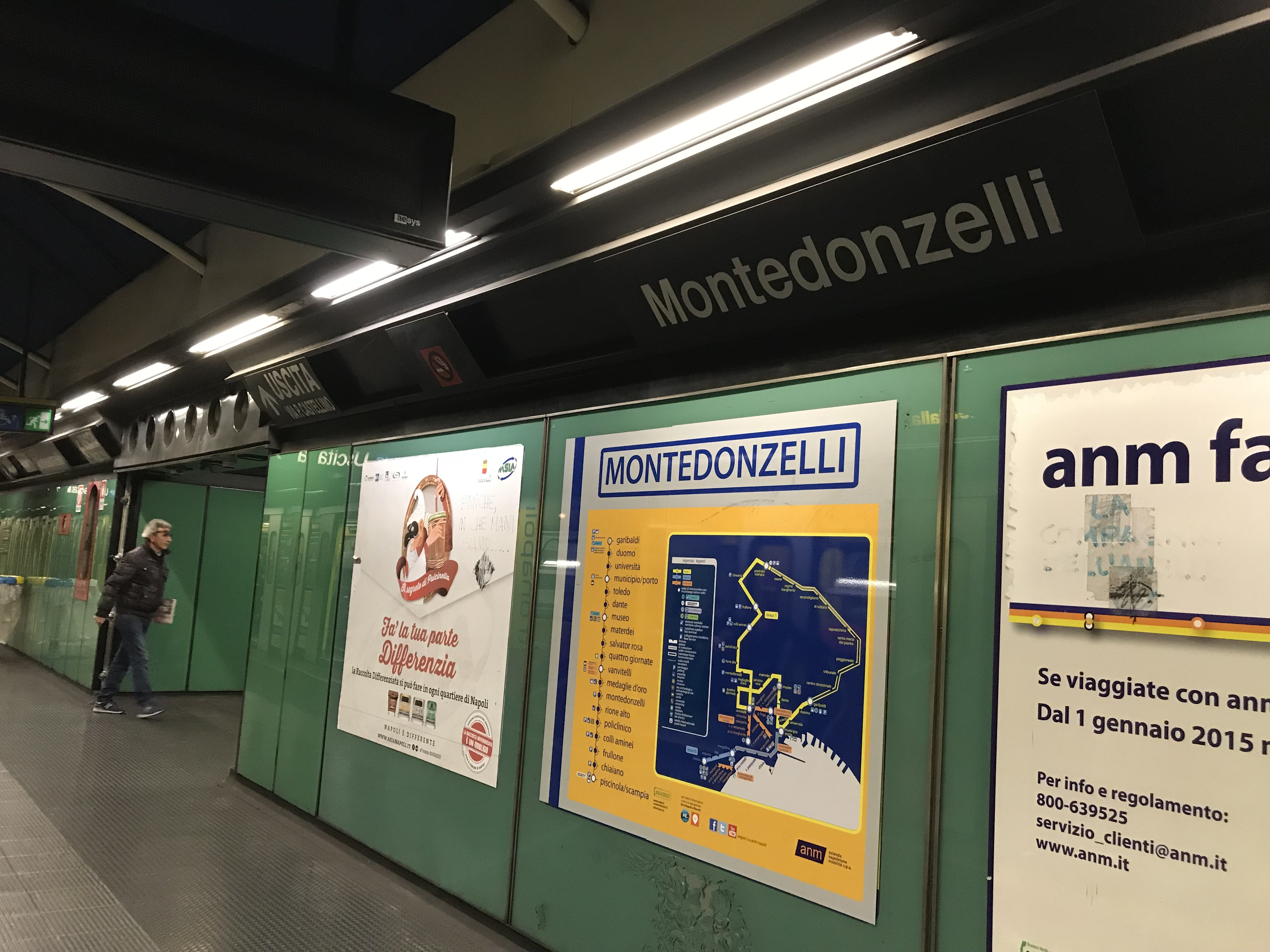

General information
- System: Naples Metro station
- Operator: ANM
- Line: Line 1

History
- Opened: 28 May 1993

Services
Preceding station	Naples Metro	Following station
Rione Alto towards Piscinola Scampia	Line 1	Medaglie d'Oro towards Centro Direzionale
Route map
Location

Montedonzelli is a Naples Metro station that serves line 1. It opened on 28 May 1993 as part of the inaugural section of Naples Metro, between Vanvitelli and Colli Aminei. The station is located between Medaglie d'Oro and Rione Alto.
