= Medaglie d'Oro station =

Naples Metro station

Coordinates: 40°51′02″N 14°13′51″E

Medaglie d'Oro
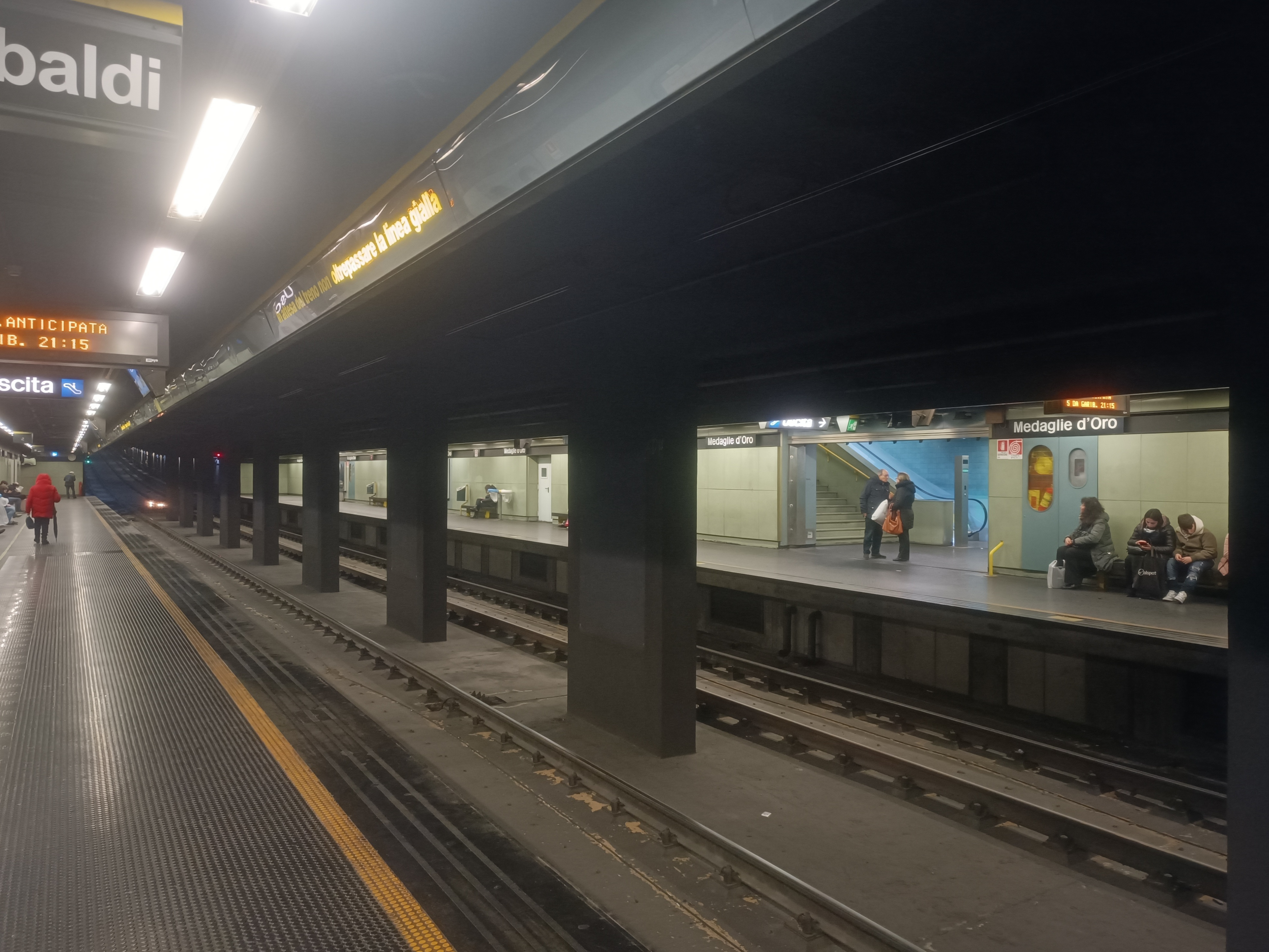

General information
- System: Naples Metro station
- Operator: ANM
- Line: Line 1

History
- Opened: 28 May 1993

Services
Preceding station	Naples Metro	Following station
Montedonzelli towards Piscinola Scampia	Line 1	Vanvitelli towards Centro Direzionale
Route map
Location

Medaglie d'Oro is a Naples Metro station that serves line 1. It opened on 28 May 1993 as part of the inaugural section of Naples Metro, between Vanvitelli and Colli Aminei. The station is located between Vanvitelli and Montedonzelli.

Built between 1980s and 1990s on a project by Michele Capobianco and Daniele Zagaria, the station serves the area of Piazza Medaglie d'Oro. The station, present in the Arenella district, is the one at the lowest altitude of the four present in the district, as well as the closest to the border with the Vomero district.

The station has six exits (originally there were seven, then the one placed in the central flowerbed was buried in the 2010s) located in the square above, plus five lifts (from NA 010 to NA 014) for the handicapped. Inside the station, the platforms are served by two platforms.

== Services ==
The station has:

- Automatic ticket office

== Connections ==
- Bus stop
