= Autostrada A56 (Italy) =

Controlled-access highway in Italy

Autostrada A56
- Tangenziale di Napoli; Naples ring road

Route information
- Maintained by ANAS
- Length: 20.2 km (12.6 mi)
- Existed: 1972–present

Major junctions
- Beltway around Naples
- East end: Capodichino
- A1 in Capodichino; A2 in Capodichino; A3 in Capodichino; A16 in Capodichino
- West end: Pozzuoli

Location
- Country: Italy
- Regions: Campania

Highway system
- Roads in Italy; Autostrade; State; Regional; Provincial; Municipal
← A 55	→ A 57

The Autostrada A56 or Tangenziale di Napoli ("Naples ring road") is an autostrada (Italian for "motorway") 20.2 kilometres (12.6 mi) long in Italy located in the region of Campania bypassing the urban center and suburban developments of Naples — connecting Pozzuoli at the west to the Autostrada A1 at the east. The most eastward section, from Doganella to the Autostrade A1, is toll-free.

== History and features ==
Designed in the 1960s, the contract to build the road was executed on 31 January 1968, and the first section opened on 8 July 1972 from Domitiana to Fuorigrotta; moving east the section to Vomero opened on 24 January 1973; the section to Arenella opened on 1 February 1975; and the section to Capodichino opened on 16 November 1975.

Subsequent exit interchanges opened at Corso Malta on 30 March 1976, at Capodimonte on 22 January 1977 and at Zona Ospedaliera on 26 May 1992, the latter facilitating access to the Cotugno, Monaldi and Pascale Hospitals.

The Autostrada A56 skirts closely to Naples hillsides; passes through a series of tunnels totaling 3.6 km (2.2 mi) in length; and passes over several older neighborhoods with a series of flyovers totalling 3.3 km (2.1 mi) in length. As one of the most congested motorways in Italy, over 270,000 vehicles use the Autostrada A56 daily, with traffic levels rivaling those of the Autostrada A4 through Milan and the Autostrada A8 near the Milan barrier toll plaza.

On 9 February 2009 an automated speed enforcement system began operating around the clock, using a system of 30 over-highway gantry-mounted cameras and 34 ceiling-mounted cameras in the tunnels. After a vehicle passes a camera, the system times the interval between the camera and a correlating set of road-embedded coils, to calculate the vehicle speed. Marketed as the Safety Tutor system (or simply Tutor), the infrastructure monitors speeds at five eastbound locations (at the Solfatara tunnel entrance, Agnano, Fuorigrotta, Arenella and Capodichino); as well as four westbound locations (at Camaldoli, Vomero, Fuorigrotta and Agnano). A map of the camera locations is available from Tangenziale di Napoli website.

Along the entire ring road there are sound-absorbing barriers as well as centrally managed information displays. Maximum speed is limited to 80 km/h (50 mph). Tangenziale di Napoli SpA manages the road, with approximately 350 employees, including toll collectors and administrators. Four vehicular service areas are located on the westbound lanes, and three additional areas serve eastbound traffic.

== Route ==
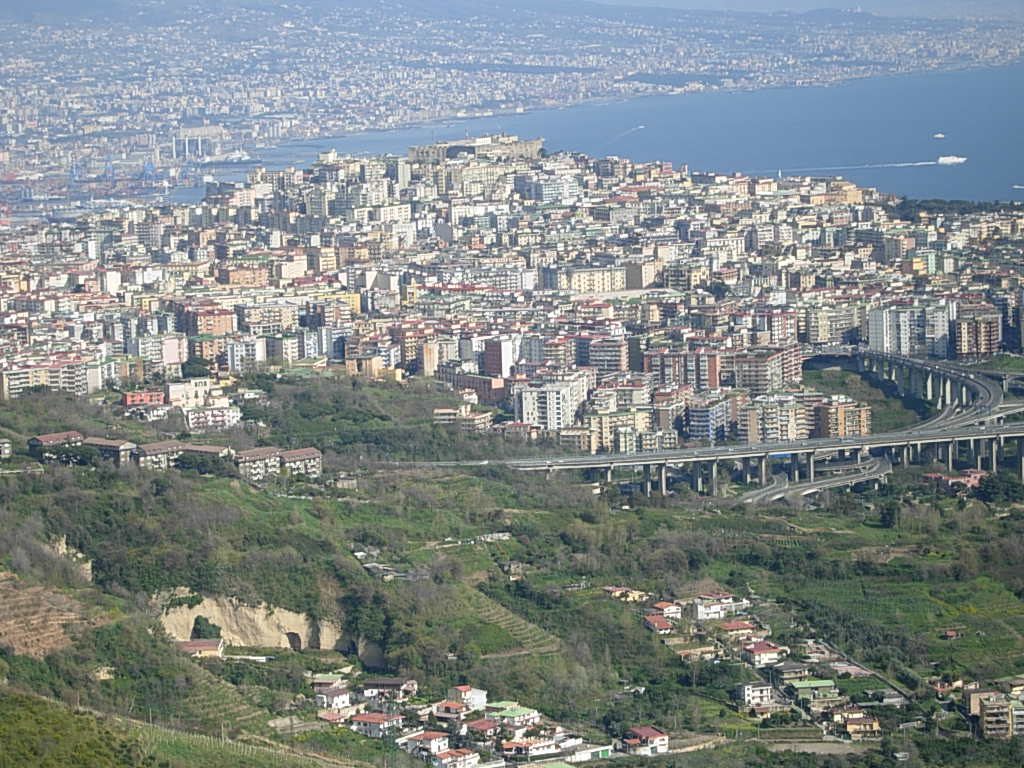
Autostrada A56 bypassing Vomero

TANGENZIALE DI NAPOLI; Autostrada A56
Exit	↓km↓	↑km↑	Province	European Route
Ramo Capodichino; Asse Mediano; Bari-Avellino-Benevento; Salerno Reggio Calabria	0.0 km (0 mi)	20.2 km (12.6 mi)	NA	--
Aeroporto Internazionale di Napoli; Circumvallazione Esterna di Napoli	0.2 km (0.12 mi)	20.0 km (12.4 mi)	NA	--
Capodichino - Secondigliano	0.5 km (0.31 mi)	19.7 km (12.2 mi)	NA	--
Rest area "Doganella ovest"	0.7 km (0.43 mi)	19.5 km (12.1 mi)	NA	--
Doganella	0.8 km (0.50 mi)	19.4 km (12.1 mi)	NA	--
Toll gate Doganella (Note: Only in the direction of Autostrada A1.)	1.0 km (0.62 mi)	19.2 km (11.9 mi)	NA	--
Corso Malta; Poggioreale; Napoli Centrale railway station Port of Naples del Centro direzionale Ponticelli - Barra; Cercola del Vesuvio; Pomigliano; Acerra	1.7 km (1.1 mi)	18.5 km (11.5 mi)	NA	--
Rest area "Scudillo"	4.0 km (2.5 mi)	16.2 km (10.1 mi)	NA	--
Capodimonte; Rione Sanità; San Gennaro dei Poveri	4.4 km (2.7 mi)	15.8 km (9.8 mi)	NA	--
Arenella; Ospedale Santobono; Quartieri Spagnoli	4.8 km (3.0 mi)	15.4 km (9.6 mi)	NA	--
Zona Ospedaliera; Linea 1 Colli Aminei	5.0 km (3.1 mi)	15.2 km (9.4 mi)	NA	--
Camaldoli	6.5 km (4.0 mi)	13.7 km (8.5 mi)	NA	--
Vomero; Posillipo; Asse Viario via Pigna; Soccavo; Pianura	7.9 km (4.9 mi)	12.3 km (7.6 mi)	NA	--
Fuorigrotta; Stadio Diego Armando Maradona; Scandone swimming pool Edenlandia; Mergellina; Bagnoli; Pianura	10.3 km (6.4 mi)	9.9 km (6.2 mi)	NA	--
Rest area "Agnano agli Astroni"	12.5 km (7.8 mi)	7.7 km (4.8 mi)	NA	--
Agnano - "Italia 90"; Spa; Agnano racecourse Edenlandia; Cratere degli Astroni nature reserve Pianura	13.2 km (8.2 mi)	7.0 km (4.3 mi)	NA	--
Toll gate Pozzuoli (Note: Direction only Pozzuoli)	14.8 km (9.2 mi)	5.4 km (3.4 mi)	NA	--
Rest area "Antica Campana"	17.0 km (10.6 mi)	3.2 km (2.0 mi)	NA	--
Via Campana; Pozzuoli	17.5 km (10.9 mi)	2.7 km (1.7 mi)	NA	--
Cuma; Cumae; Spa	19.3 km (12.0 mi)	0.9 km (0.56 mi)	NA	--
Arco Felice - Pozzuoli - Bacoli	19.7 km (12.2 mi)	0.5 km (0.31 mi)	NA	--
Domiziana	20.2 km (12.6 mi)	0.0 km (0 mi)	NA	--

== See also ==
- Autostrade of Italy
- Roads in Italy
- Transport in Italy

=== Other Italian roads ===
- State highways (Italy)
- Regional road (Italy)
- Provincial road (Italy)
- Municipal road (Italy)
