= Policlinico station =

Naples Metro station

Coordinates: 40°51′57″N 14°13′18″E

Policlinico
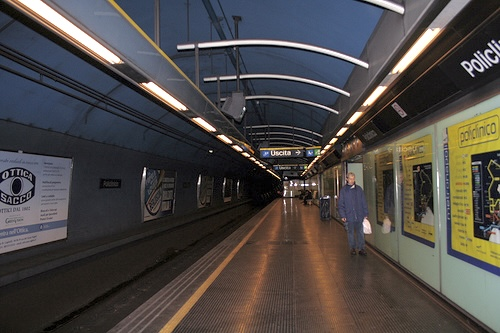
- The platforms

General information
- System: Naples Metro station
- Operator: ANM
- Line: Line 1

History
- Opened: 28 May 1993

Services
Preceding station	Naples Metro	Following station
Colli Aminei towards Piscinola Scampia	Line 1	Rione Alto towards Centro Direzionale
Route map
Location

Policlinico is a Naples Metro station that serves line 1. It opened on 28 May 1993 as part of the inaugural section of Naples Metro, between Vanvitelli and Colli Aminei. The station is located between Rione Alto and Colli Aminei.
