= Gaetano Genovese =

Italian architect and designer

Gaetano Genovese (1795, Eboli - 1875, Naples) was an Italian architect and designer. He is most notable as the chief royal architect for almost all of the reign of Ferdinand II of the Two Sicilies.
