= Gabriele Agnolo =

Italian architect

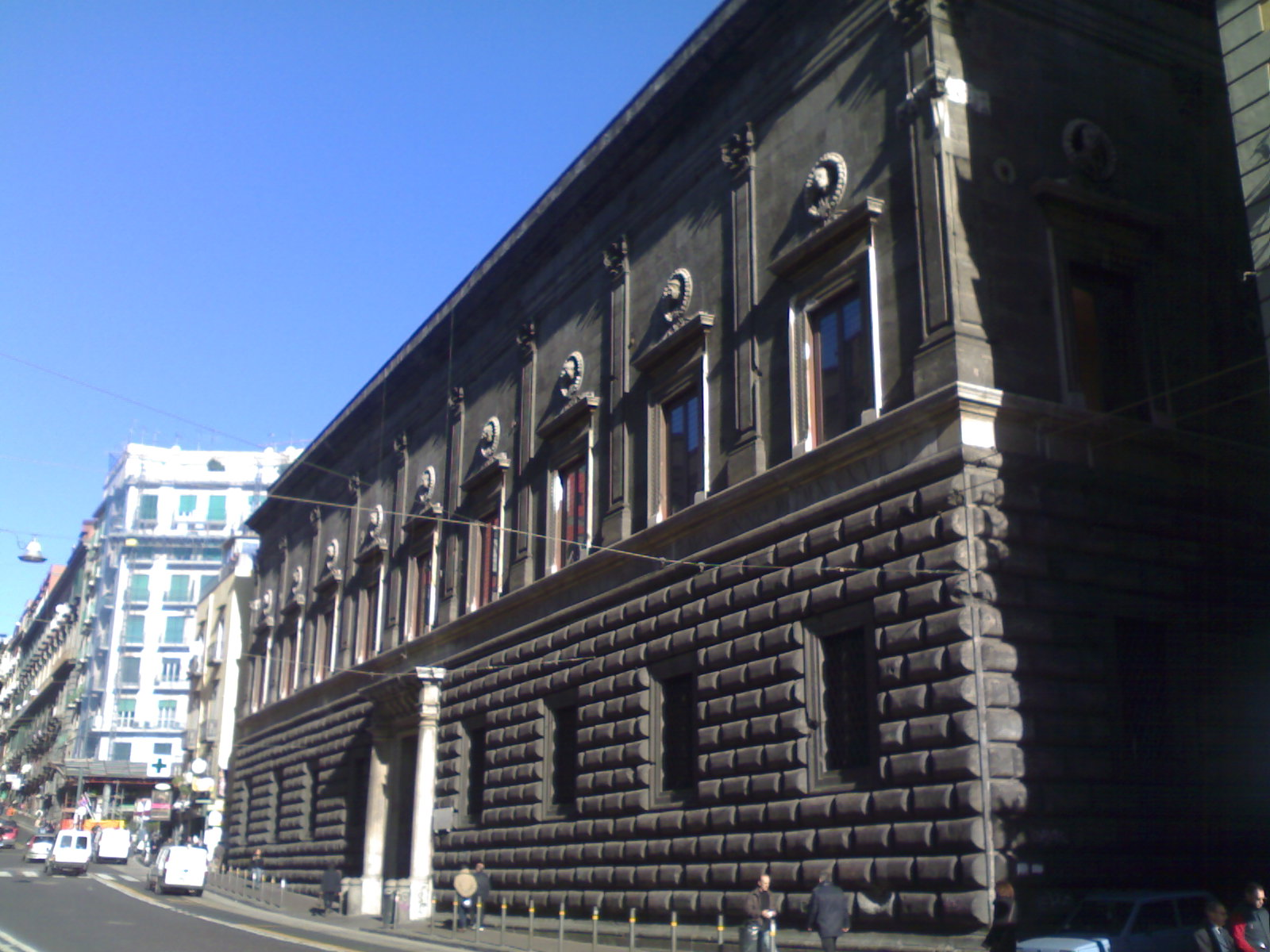
Palazzo Orsini a Gravina

Gabriele Agnolo, also known as Gabriele d'Angelo (died 1510) was an Italian architect active in Naples in the early-Renaissance manner.

He was born in Naples, and followed in the style of the contemporaries, Novello da San Lucano and Giovanni Francesco Mormando. He was active in 1480, and participated in work on the church of Santa Maria Egiziaca a Forcella and San Giuseppe. He designed the Palazzo Orsini a Gravina.

== Bibliography ==
- Boni, Filippo de' (1852). Biografia degli artisti ovvero dizionario della vita e delle opere dei pittori, degli scultori, degli intagliatori, dei tipografi e dei musici di ogni nazione che fiorirono da'tempi più remoti sino á nostri giorni. Seconda Edizione.. Venice; Googlebooks: Presso Andrea Santini e Figlio. p. 7.
