= Piazza Medaglie d'Oro =

Square in Naples

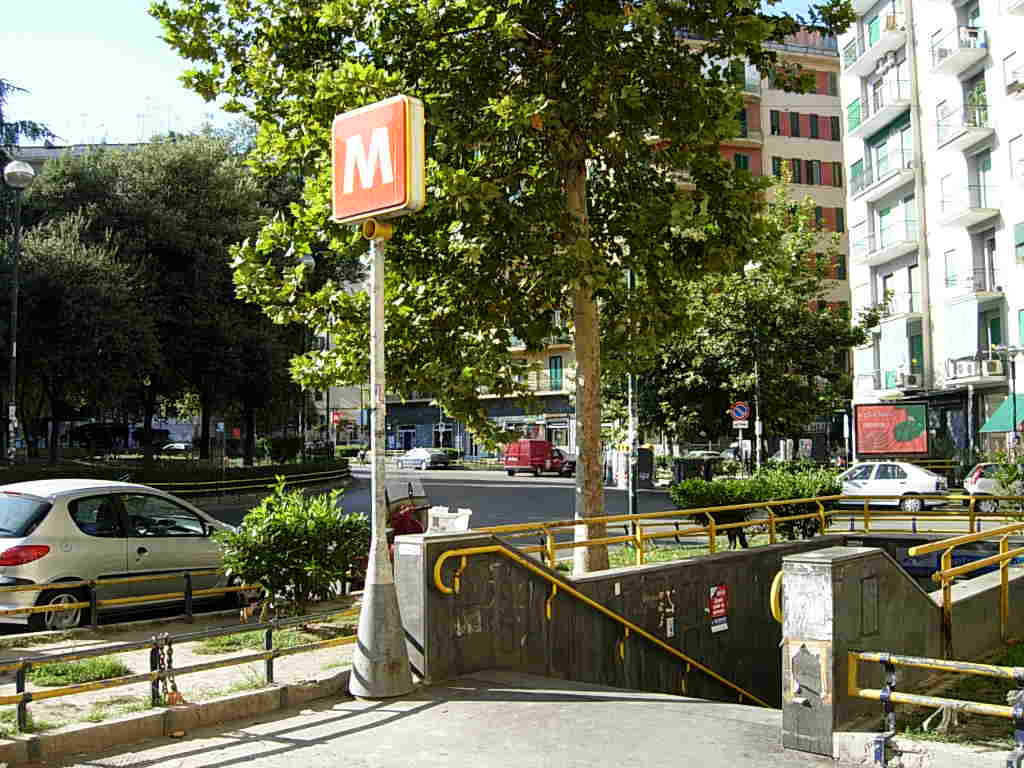
Piazza Medaglie d'Oro, entrance to the underground stop of the homonym station.

Piazza Medaglie d'Oro, in the Arenella district, is one of the main squares in the Vomero district, in the city of Naples. In the square, octagonal in shape, eight streets radiate out, including some of the main arteries of the district, making it one of the nodal points of the neapolitan urban structure, crossroads and switching point of the Fifth Municipality of Naples, which includes the two Arenella and Vomero.

The square is also important from the point of view of toponymy, as it is located at the center of a series of streets dedicated to neapolitans decorated with a gold medal for military valour, almost all from the first half of the twentieth century; among these Ugo Niutta, Mario Fiore, Giuseppe Orsi, Raffaele Tarantini, Guido Menzinger, Raffaele Libroia, Francesco Azzi, Teodoro Capocci, Raffaele Stasi, Domenico De Dominicis and several others. The gardens in the center of the square were dedicated to the memory of Silvia Ruotolo, an innocent victim of the Camorra, who was killed on June 11, 1997, having found herself by chance in the middle of a settling of scores between rival clans in Salita Arenella, near her house.

== Description and history ==
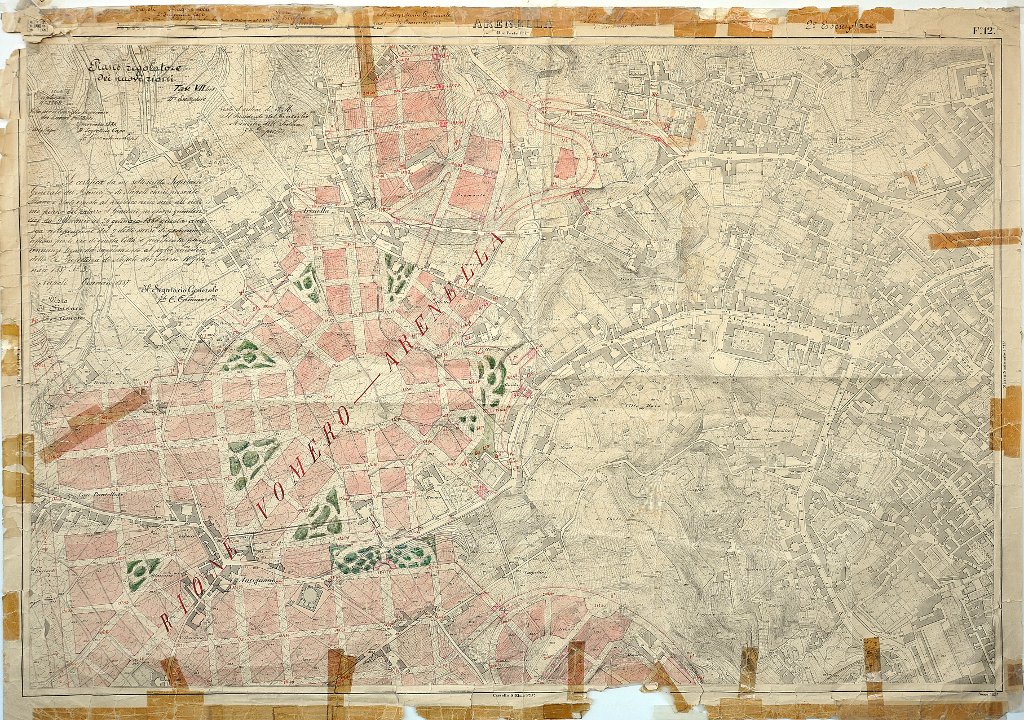
Tavola Schiavoni n.12, work by Federico Schiavoni, on which the urbanization project of the area of Piazza Medaglie d'Oro by Adolfo Giambarba is visible.

The whole area of the square and the surrounding area were still outside the city perimeter until the end of the 19th century. The first urbanization project of the area, in which the square was the main point according to a radial design already very similar to the current one and inspired by the ideas of the French urban planner Georges Eugène Haussmann, dates back to 1885 by Adolfo Giambarba, already responsible for the elaboration of the projects for the "Risanamento di Napoli". This realization hypothesis, however, did not find immediate realization due to economic difficulties and the banking crisis of the late nineteenth century.

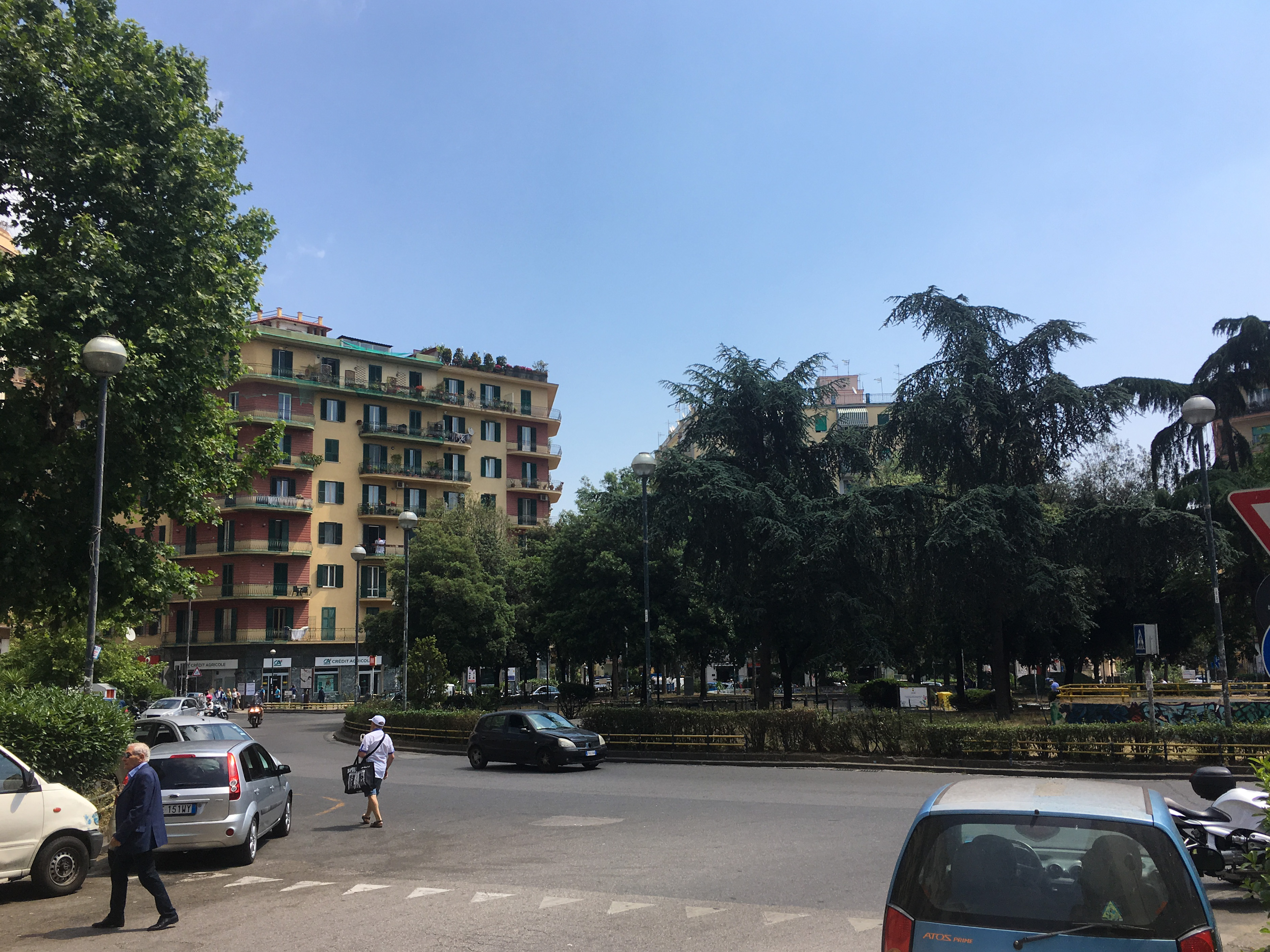
Piazza Medaglie d'Oro in 2017.

Although therefore already planned in 1886, the works began only in 1927, based on an agreement stipulated the previous year and which provided for the accommodation of over fifty thousand people on an extension of about 250,000 square meters, with only modifications minors to the design of Giambarba. The works continued for several years, while Piazza Medaglie d'Oro in particular was completed in 1930.

In the square there is the homonymous station of Line 1 of the Naples underground, and it is in this square that, symbolically, on December 22, 1977, in the presence of the mayor Maurizio Valenzi and the transport councilor Luigi Buccico, the "first stone" of the new metro line. The station was built between 1980 and 1990, based on a design by Michele Capobianco and Daniele Zagaria and opened in 1993. The station has six exits located in the square (originally there were seven, but later the exit located in the central flowerbed of the square was closed and buried in the 2010s), plus five lifts for the Handicapped people. Inside the station, the platforms are served by two platforms.
