= Novello da San Lucano =

Italian architect and designer (c. 1435 – 1516)

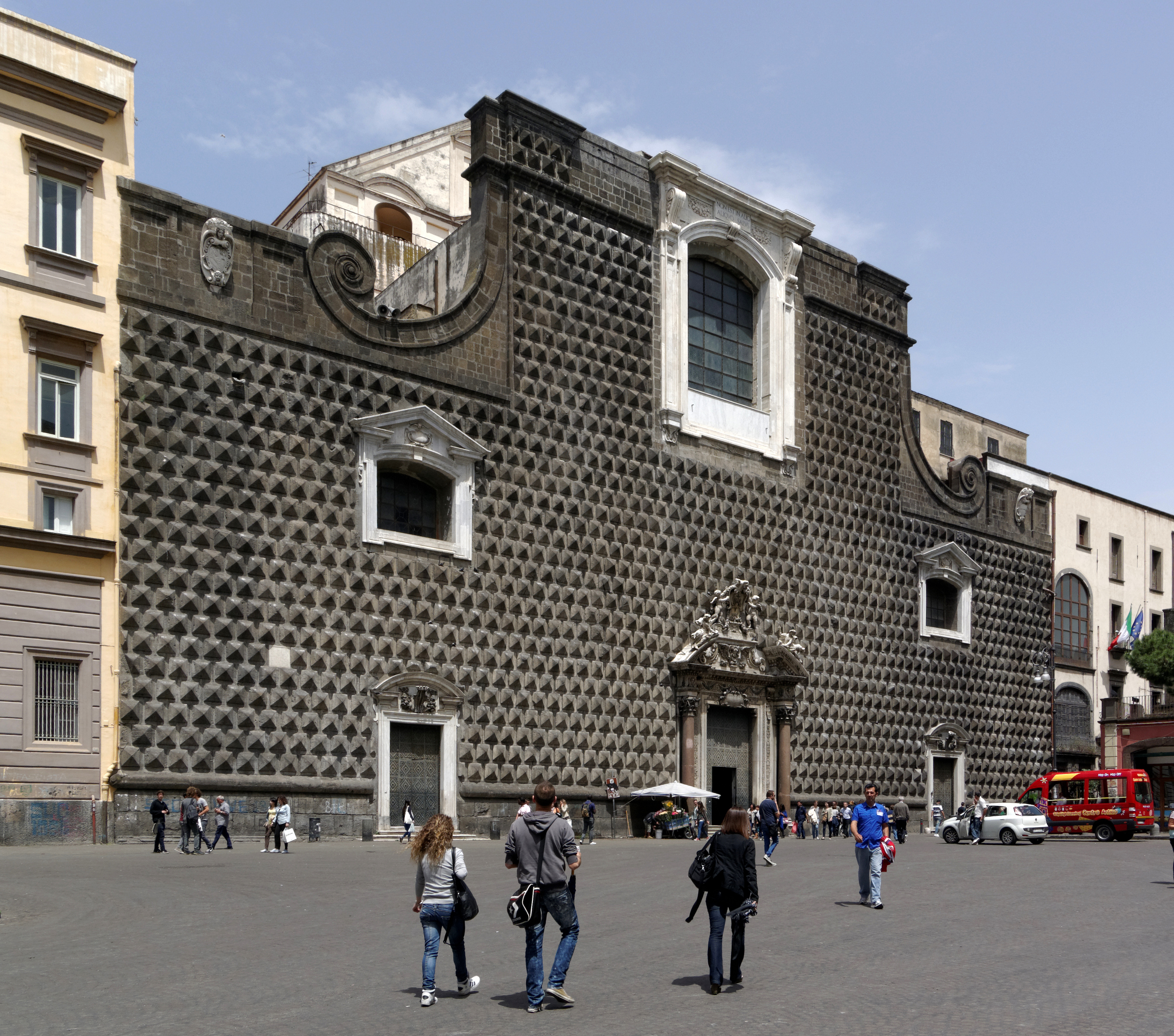
His facade of the palazzo Sanseverino in Naples

Novello da San Lucano (c. 1435, San Severino Lucano – 1516, Alba Iulia) was an Italian architect and designer, mainly active in Naples.

He was probably born in San Severino Lucano, a fief of the Sanseverino family, for whom he produced most of his designs. He was ordained a brother and studied under Angelo Aniello Fiore as well as taking a trip to Rome. His works include the belltower of San Giovanni in Parco in the town of Mercato San Severino and the restoration of San Domenico Maggiore, Naples.
