= Vanvitelli station =

Naples Metro station

Vanvitelli
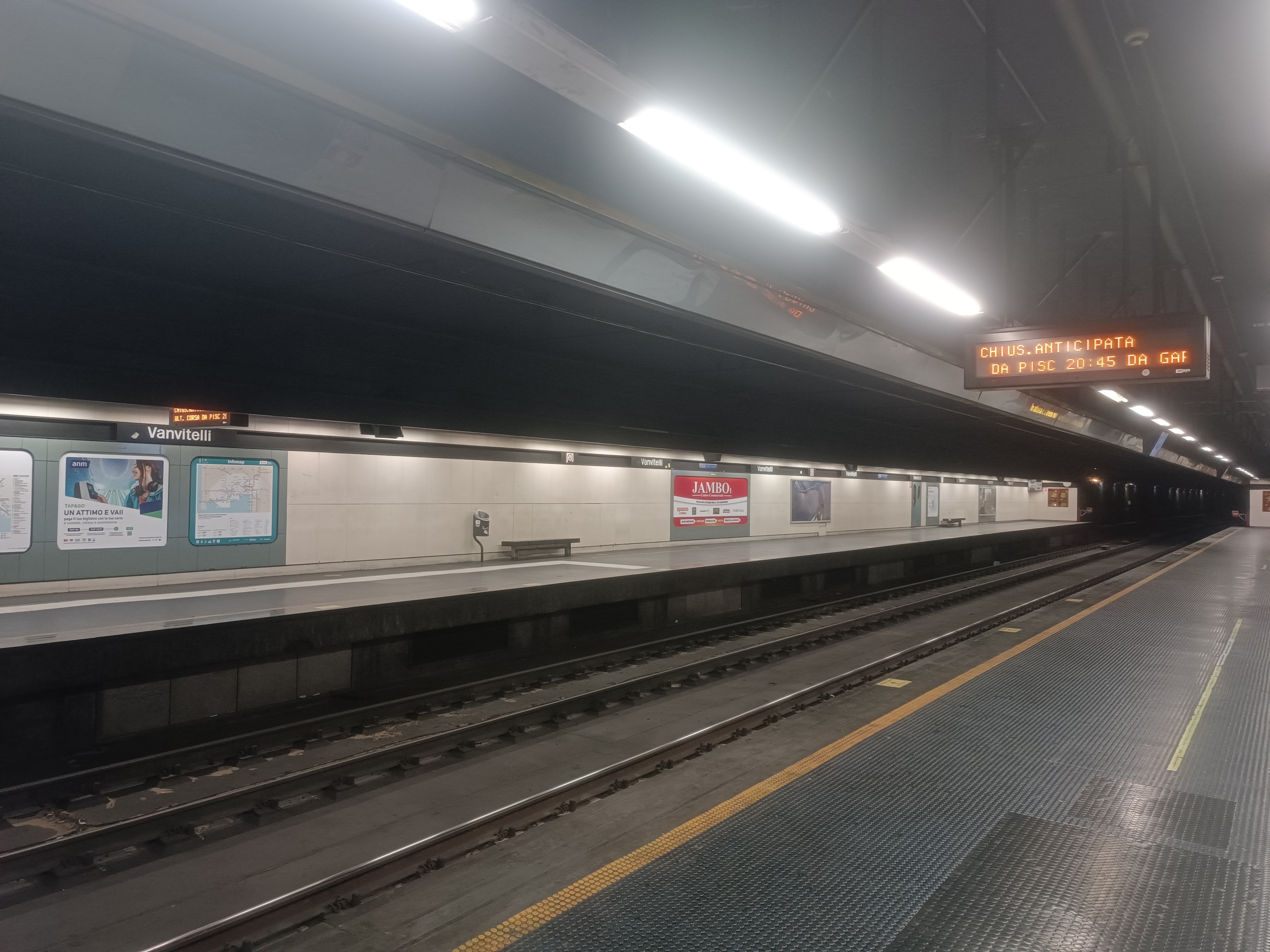

General information
- Location: Piazza Vanvitelli, Naples
- Coordinates: 40°50′38″N 14°13′55″E
- System: Naples Metro station
- Operator: ANM
- Line: Line 1
- Connections: Central Funicular; Chiaia Funicular; Montesanto Funicular; Urban and suburban buses.

History
- Opened: 28 May 1993

Services
Preceding station	Naples Metro	Following station
Medaglie d'Oro towards Piscinola Scampia	Line 1	Quattro Giornate towards Centro Direzionale
Route map
Location

Vanvitelli is a Naples Metro underground station that serves Line 1. It was opened on 28 May 1993 as the southern terminus of the inaugural section of Naples Metro, between Vanvitelli and Colli Aminei. On 5 April 2001, the line was extended to Museo, and Vanvitelli ceased to be the terminus.

== History ==
Work began in 1977 but was later interrupted and resumed in 1985. The station was inaugurated on March 28, 1993, as part of the first section of Line 1 to be opened. The construction of the station involved a total investment of approximately 22.1 million euros.

== Station layout ==
The station was built according to the plans of Michele Capobianco and has undergone a radical restoration (thanks to which the station is part of the circuit of art stations) directed by Michele Capobianco and his son Lorenzo Capobianco with artistic consulting by Achille Bonito Oliva.

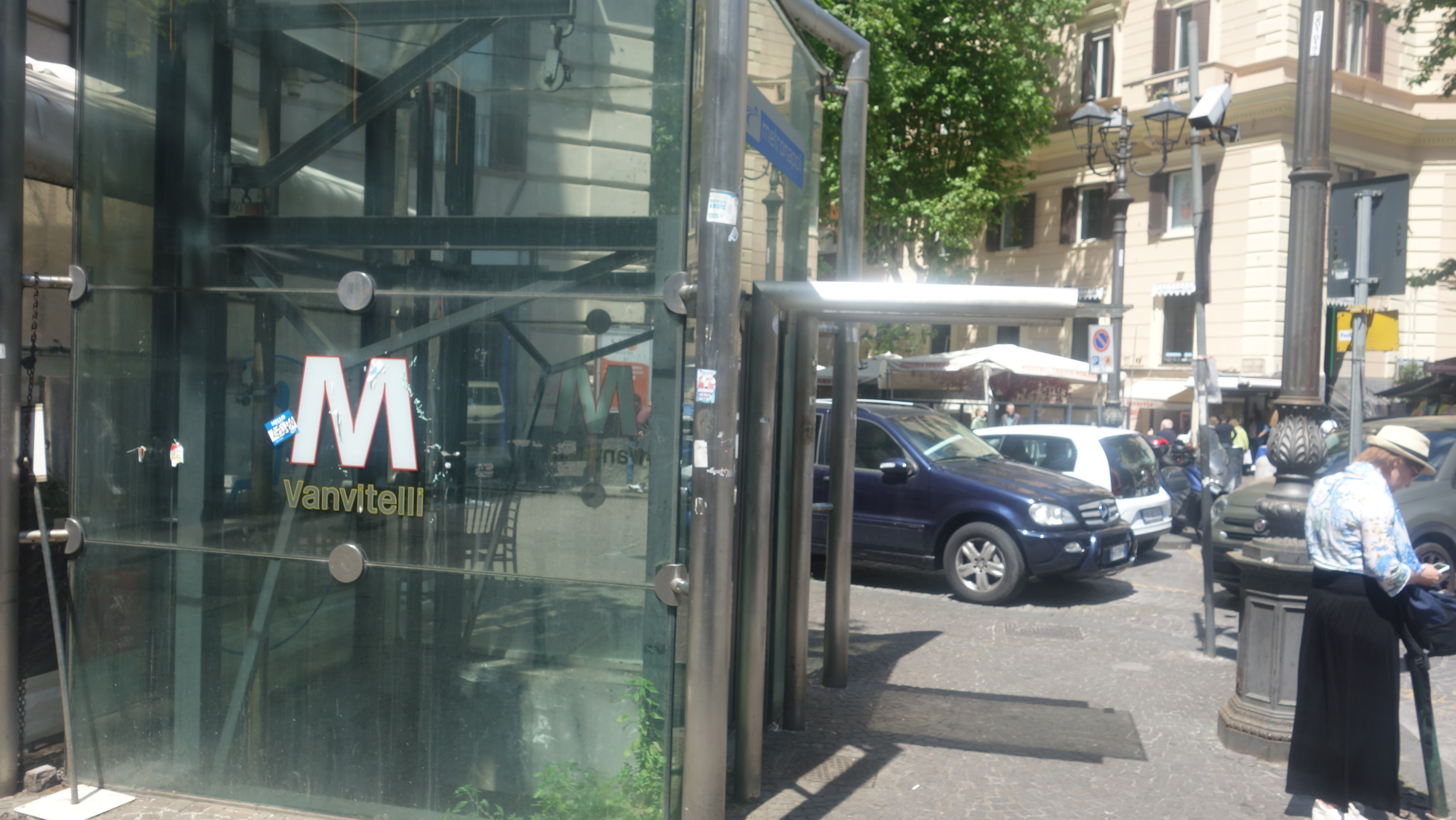
Elevator in Piazza Vanvitelli

The entrances are placed in the four corners of Piazza Vanvitelli, as well as an underground corridor that leads from the station directly to the two funiculars namely that of Chiaia and Central. The descent to the level of the tracks is via two sets of fixed stairs and furniture while the output directly via a single ramp. You can also make use of the elevators.

The station, located underground, covers an area of 5,419 square metres (58,330 sq ft), with a total intervention area of 8,000 square metres (86,000 sq ft). The station is 20 metres (66 ft) deep, has a slope of 5.5%, and is equipped with 13 facilities and 4 exits.

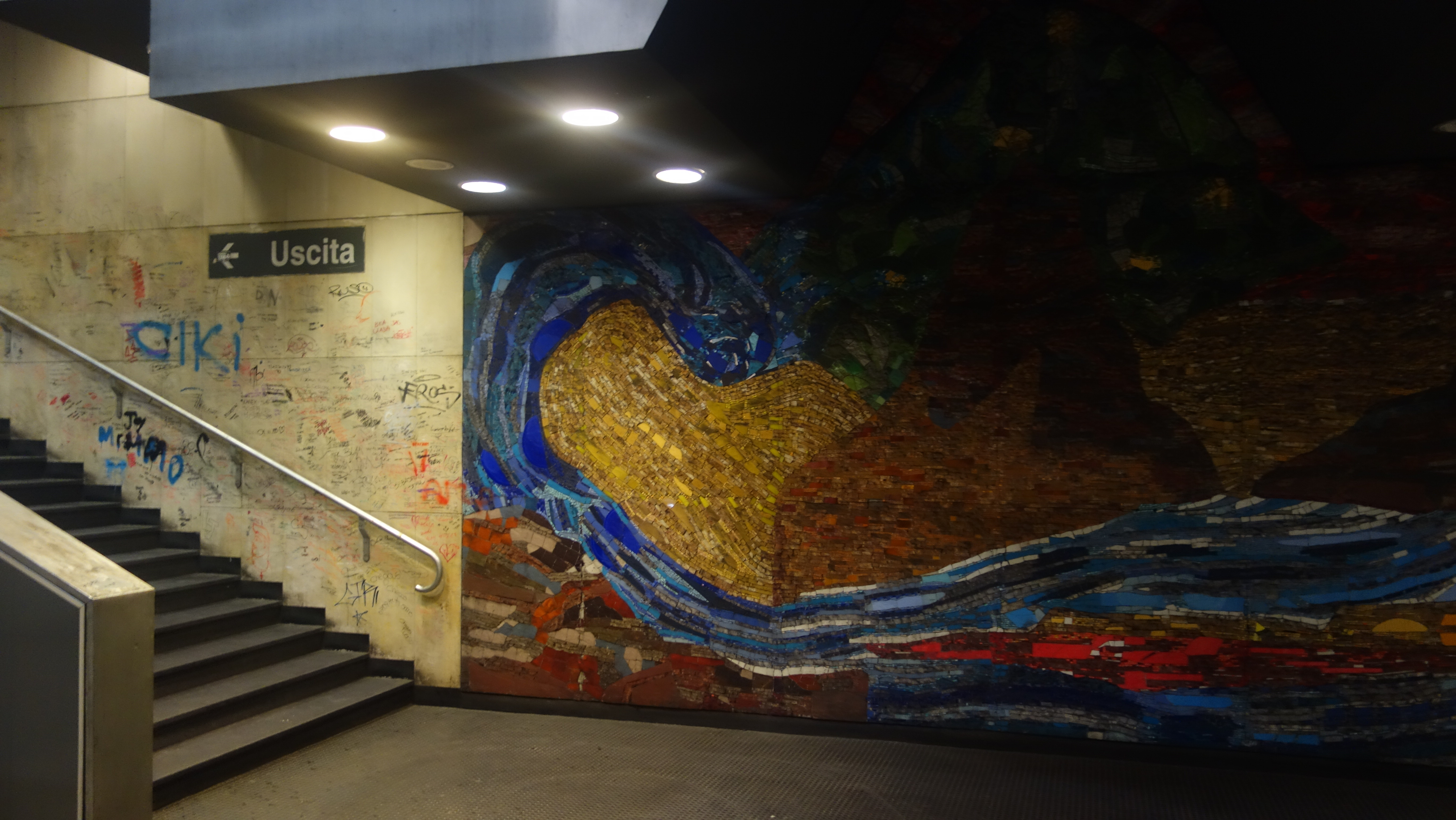
An art installation by Giulio Paolini depicting a boulder enclosed in a glass cage, located near the exit stairs on the platform.

In the atrium, there is an installation by Giulio Paolini consisting of a large boulder that appears to break through the transparent enclosure imprisoning it. The side corridors are adorned with a long strip by Vettor Pisani and photographs of Naples' architecture by Gabriele Basilico and Olivo Barbieri. In the mezzanine, there is a work by Mario Merz representing the Fibonacci sequence, which continues on the back vertical wall with depictions of prehistoric animals. On the side walls of the ascending escalators, there are two steel stars by Gilberto Zorio. At the intersection of the stairs leading to the two platforms, eight cylinders by Gregorio Botta are displayed. On the platforms, there are two large mosaics by Isabella Ducrot.

== See also ==
- List of Naples metro stations
