= Colli Aminei station =

Naples Metro station

Coordinates: 40°52′11″N 14°13′43″E

Colli Aminei
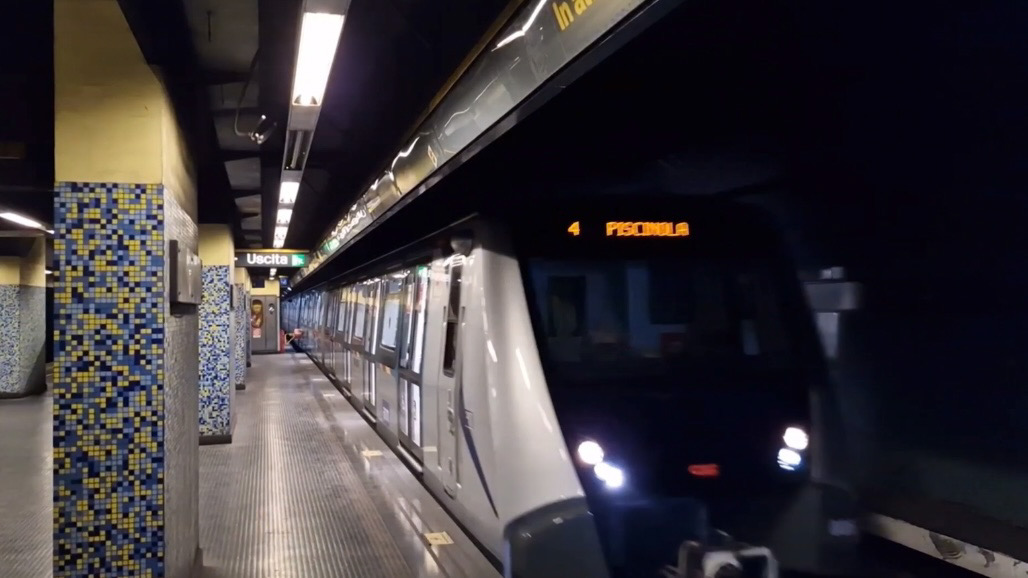

General information
- System: Naples Metro station
- Operator: ANM
- Line: Line 1

History
- Opened: 28 May 1993

Services
Preceding station	Naples Metro	Following station
Frullone-San Rocco towards Piscinola Scampia	Line 1	Policlinico towards Centro Direzionale
Route map
Location

Colli Aminei is a Naples Metro station that serves line 1. It opened on 28 May 1993 as the northern terminus of the inaugural section of Naples Metro, between Vanvitelli and Colli Aminei. On 19 July 1995, the line was extended to Piscinola Scampia, and Colli Aminei ceased to be the terminus. The station is located between Policlinico and Frullone-San Rocco.
