= Viale Antonio Gramsci =

Street in Naples, Italy

- Viale Regina Elena, Corso Umberto I
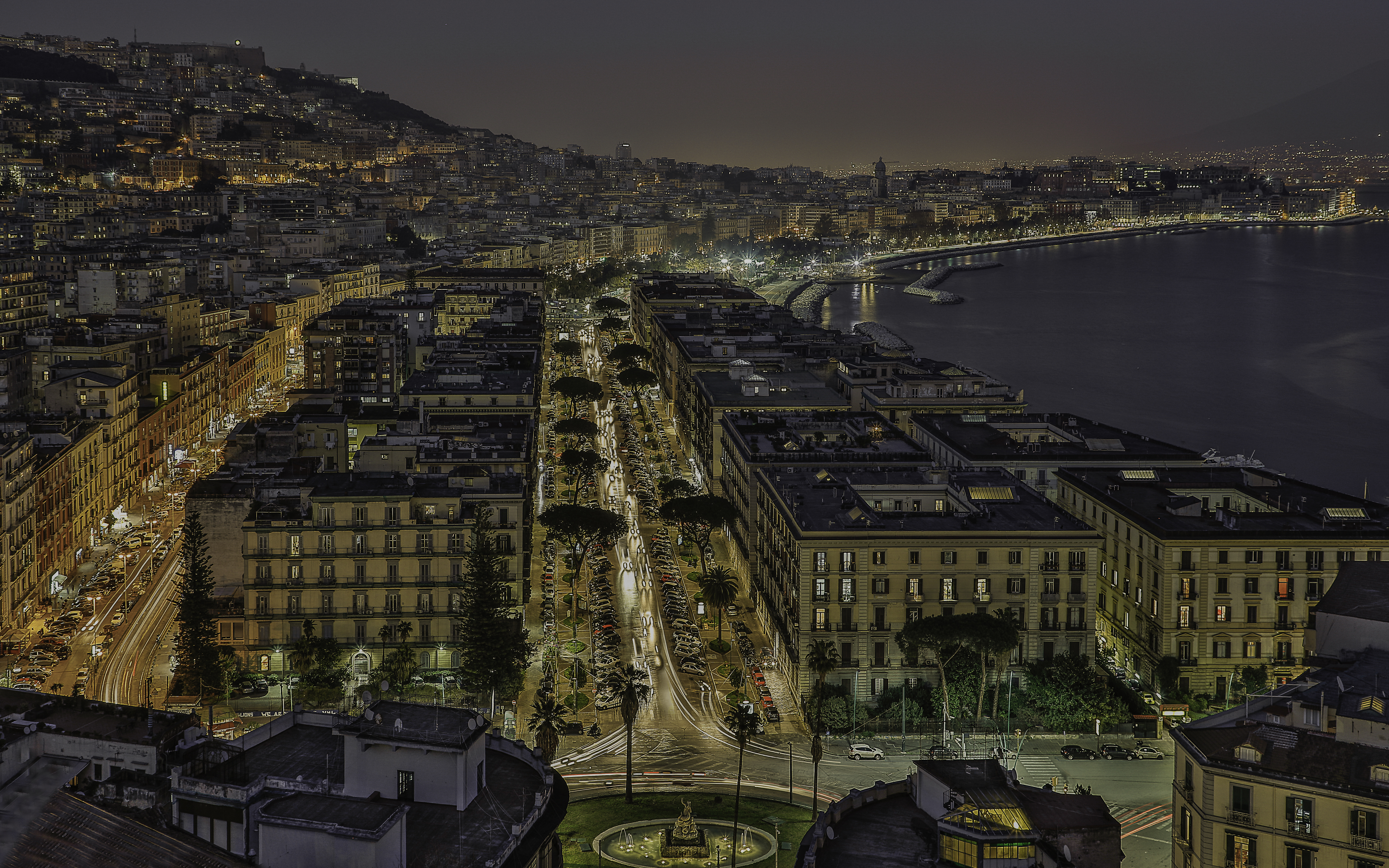
- Viale Gramsci seen from Posillipo
- Interactive map of Viale Antonio Gramsci
- Location: Naples, Italy
- Quarter: Chiaia
- Postal code: 80122
- From: Piazza della Repubblica
- To: Mergellina

Viale Antonio Gramsci is a street in Naples, Italy, in the Chiaia quarter. It runs parallel to Via Francesco Caracciolo, between Piazza della Repubblica and the Mergellina area, and is one of the few Neapolitan examples of a large nineteenth-century boulevard. Before being named after Antonio Gramsci, the street was called Corso Umberto I and Viale Regina Elena, the latter name still in common use today.

== History ==
The avenue did not exist before the Unification of Italy: its entire course was reclaimed from the sea. In the decades following 1861, the municipal government entrusted the barons Du Mesnil, entrepreneurs of Belgian origin, with the reclamation of the stretch of coast between Mergellina and Borgo Santa Lucia. In exchange for the work, they were granted permission to build on the newly formed land, and Oscar Du Mesnil is responsible for the design of much of the buildings that today face the avenue, Via Caracciolo, and Via Partenope.

The street layout, between Piazza Vittoria and Mergellina, was completed by 1873, while the city map published by the Topographic Office in 1870 already showed the road partially built. The new plots of land were purchased mainly by the Neapolitan and southern Italian aristocracy, who placed their summer residences overlooking the gulf there. Family coats of arms placed above almost all the entrances remain from that period.

== Description ==
With a width of more than forty metres, the avenue was designed on the model of the Parisian boulevards, from which it also takes its contre-allées, the smaller side carriageways originally intended for a bridle path and, more generally, for local traffic. Many of the buildings on the seaward side have two entrances, one on the avenue and the other on Via Caracciolo.

A distinctive feature of the street is the presence of large pine trees. In February 2019, the felling of five century-old specimens, ordered for safety reasons, prompted protests from residents.

== Architecture ==
The first notable building to rise on the reclaimed land was the Villa Sanfelice di Monteforte, commissioned in 1869 by Prince Tommaso of Savoy from the Swiss architect Augusto Guidini, and passed in 1873 to the Sanfelice noble family.

Among the most notable buildings is Palazzo Berlingieri, commissioned by the Calabrian marquesses of the Berlingieri family and completed, according to the date engraved on the door stop, in 1885: a five-storey neo-Renaissance building, with the family coat of arms repeated over both entrances. At number 22 stands a palazzo from the last quarter of the nineteenth century, with a neo-Baroque facade in which pairs of telamones support the balconies.

At number 53 stands an eclectic villa built in 1882 for the orientalist Angelo de Gubernatis: the facade once bore, alongside the effigies of Dante and Manzoni, images of the Buddha and Ganesha with inscriptions in Pali and Sanskrit, now lost.

At the eastern end of the avenue, on Piazza della Repubblica, is the seat of the Consulate General of the United States in Naples; other consular representations are located along the street.

== See also ==
- Streets of Naples
