= Chiaia =

Neighbourhood in Naples, Italy

Coordinates: 40°50′03″N 14°13′33″E

- Quarter of Naples
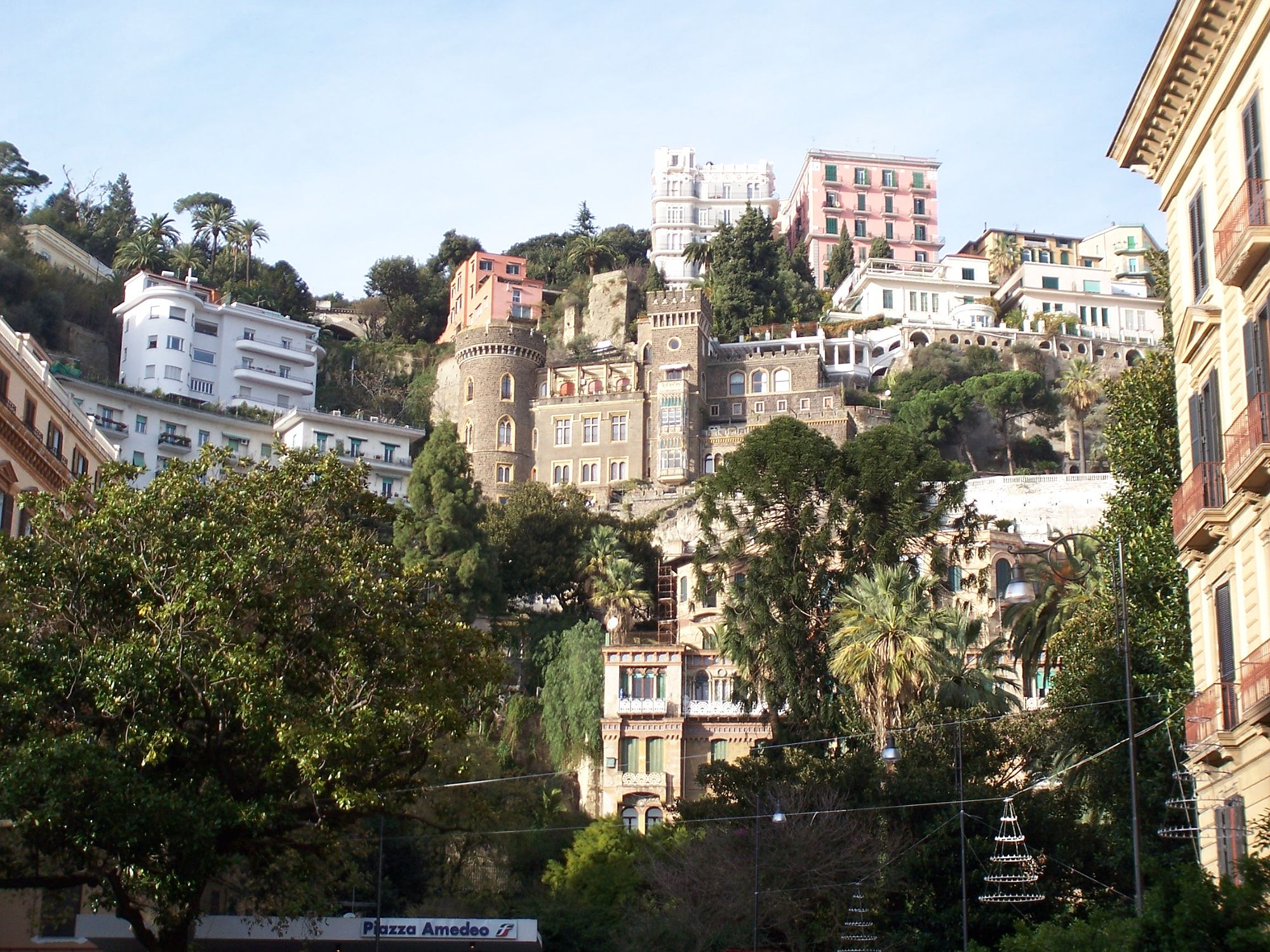
- The upper part of the neighborhood, accessed from Piazza Amedeo

- Location of Chiaia within Naples
- Country: Italy
- Region: Campania
- City: Naples
- Municipalità: 1st

Area
  - Total: 2.71 km^{2} (1.05 sq mi)

Population
  - Total: 38.356
  - Density: 14.2/km^{2} (36.7/sq mi)
- Demonym: chiaiesi
- Postal codes: 80121, 80122 and 80132

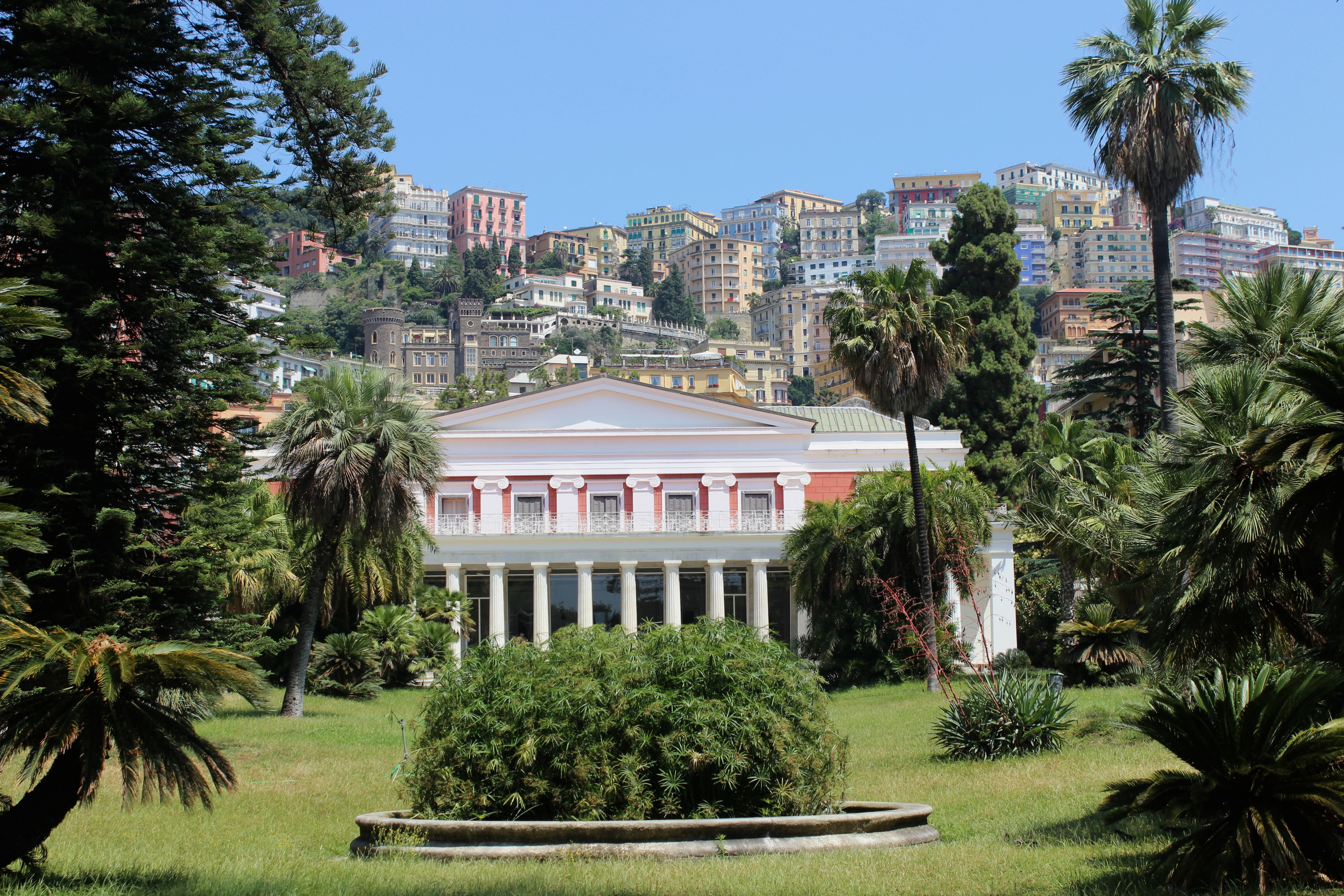
Villa Pignatelli, one of the many villas located along the Riviera di Chiaia

Chiaia (Italian pronunciation: [ˈkjaːja], Neapolitan pronunciation: [ˈkjɑːjə]) is an affluent quarter on the seafront in Naples, Italy, bounded by Piazza Vittoria on the east and Mergellina on the west. Chiaia is one of the wealthiest districts in Naples, and many luxury brands have shops on its main street. It is also home to a business school and a medical school, as well as other public schools.

A prominent landmark in Chiaia is the large public park known as the Villa Comunale. It was initially developed in the late 16th and early 17th centuries as the Spanish rulers of Naples opened the city to the west of its historical boundaries.

The Renaissance poet Laura Terracina was born and raised in Chiaia.

== Buildings and structures in the neighbourhood ==
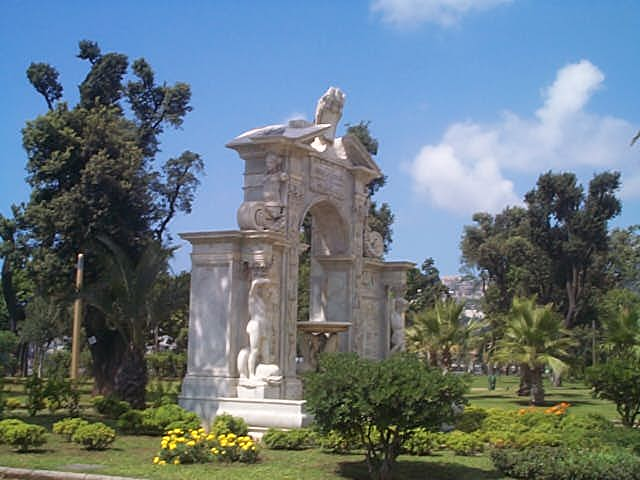
One of the many fountains in the Villa Comunale of Naples

- Castel dell'Ovo
- Fontana del Sebeto
- Palazzo Ravaschieri di Satriano
- Santi Giovanni e Teresa
- Pasquale a Chiaia
- Sant'Orsola a Chiaia
- Santa Caterina a Chiaia
- Santa Maria Apparente
- Santa Maria del Parto a Mergellina
- Santa Maria della Neve in San Giuseppe
- Santa Maria della Vittoria
- Santa Maria di Piedigrotta
- Santa Maria in Portico
- Santa Teresa a Chiaia
- Villa Pignatelli
