= Leonardo da Pistoia =

Italian painter

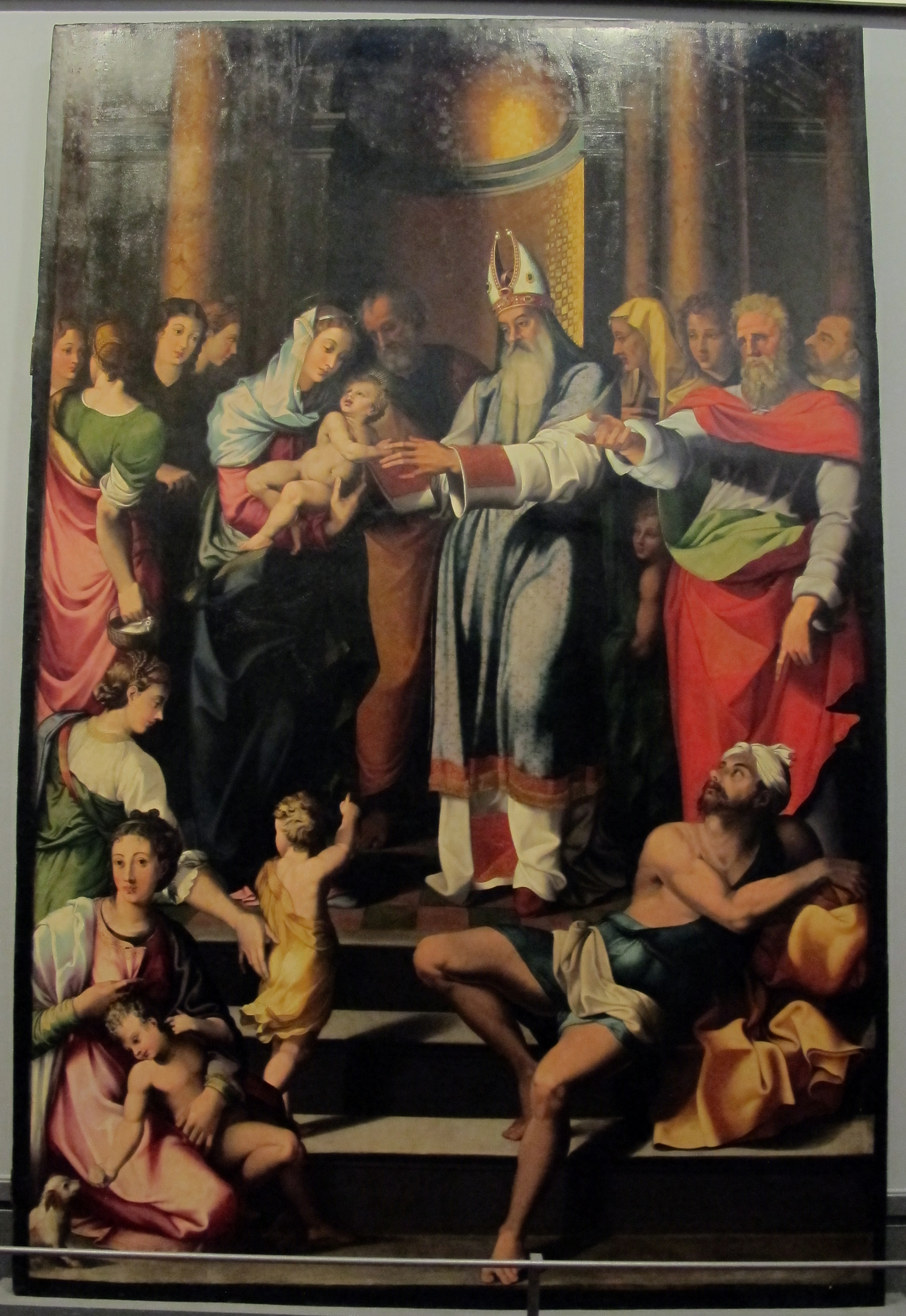
Presentation at the Temple, c. 1544.

Leonardo da Pistoia, also known as Leonardo Grazia, (1502 – c. 1548) was an Italian painter of the Mannerism school.

== Biography ==
Da Pistoia was born in the city of Pistoia, Tuscany, and died in Naples.

According to Benezit, he is often confused with Leonardo di Francesco di Lazzaro Malatesta (ca. 1483 – after 1518). Both men were known as "Leonardo da Pistoia" or as "Malatesta." In Naples, da Pistoia was also known as "Guido da Napoli" or as "Guelfo dal Celano."

Early in his career, da Pistoia worked in Rome under Gianfrancesco Penni (also known as "il Fattore"). He was a copyist of Raphael's paintings. He and Penni later relocated to Naples. While there, da Pistoia painted for the churches of Santa Maria del Parto a Mergellina, San Domenico Maggiore, and Monte Oliveto.

His pupils in Naples included Girolamo Siciolante da Sermoneta and Francesco Curia.

== Bibliography ==
- Farquhar, Maria (1855). Ralph Nicholson Wornum (ed.). Biographical Catalogue of the Principal Italian Painters. London: Woodfall & Kinder. "Wornum principal painters."
