= Palazzo Ravaschieri di Satriano =

Coordinates: 40.833125°N 14.240886°E

The Palazzo Ravaschieri di Satriano is a monumental palace on the Riviera di Chiaia number 287, in Naples, Italy.

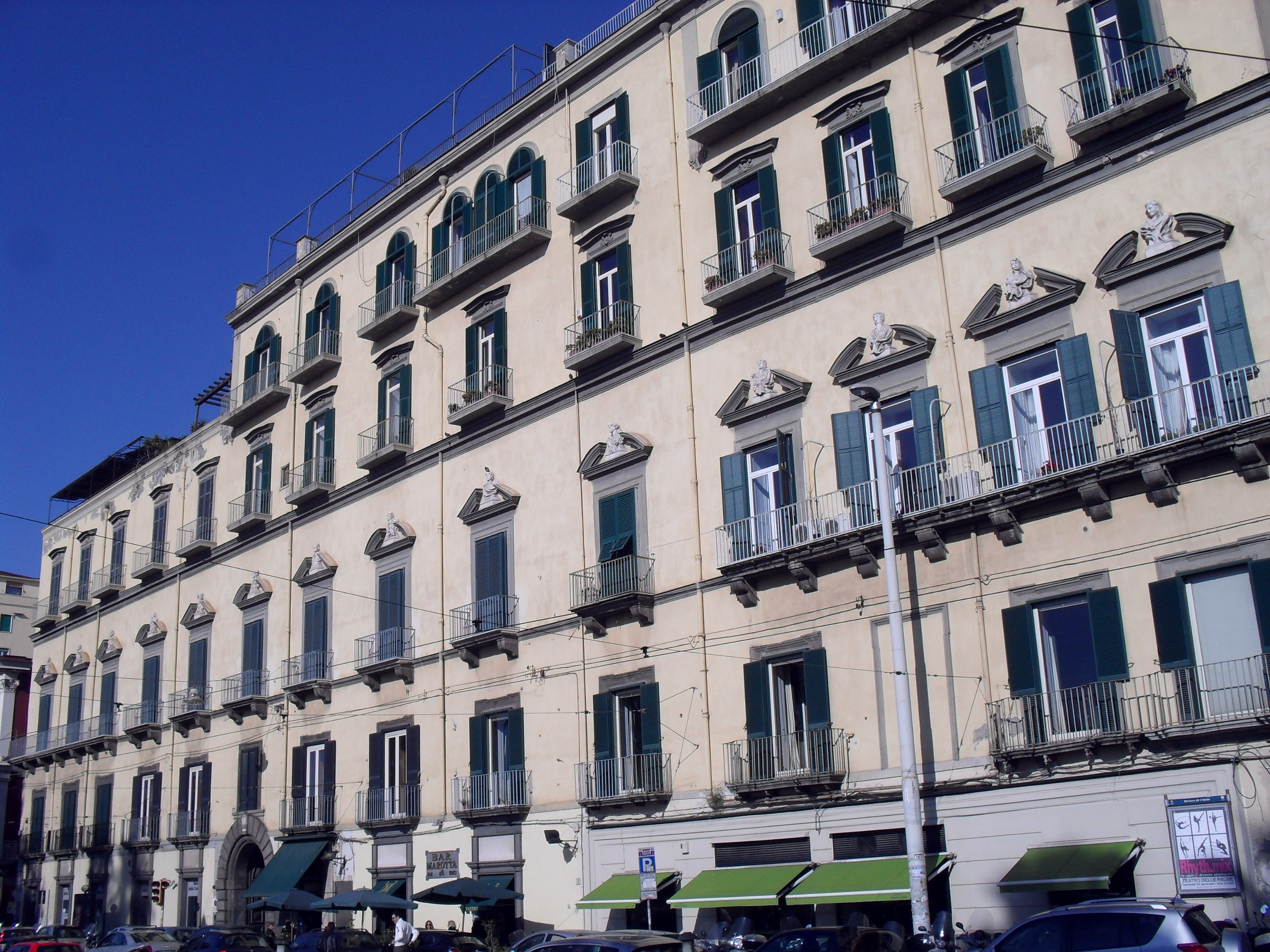
Façade of the palace

The palace was commissioned in 1605 by Prince Ravaschieri di Satriano and was one of the first palaces built in shores of Chiaia. In 1675, it was the home of the Viceroy Fernando Fajardo y Álvarez de Toledo, who refurbished the facade and courtyard. Many famous visitors to Naples have stayed here, including Goethe in 1787, as guest of Princess Teresa Ravaschieri, wife of Prince Filippo Ravaschieri Fieschi di Satriano, and sister of Gaetano Filangieri. These owners commissioned the architect Ferdinando Sanfelice, to construct a staircase between the original two floors. It had many subsequent owners, and now has been subdivided into apartments and businesses. In the mid 19th century, the architect Gaetano Genovese rebuilt the main floors.
