= Pierre-Jacques Volaire =

French painter

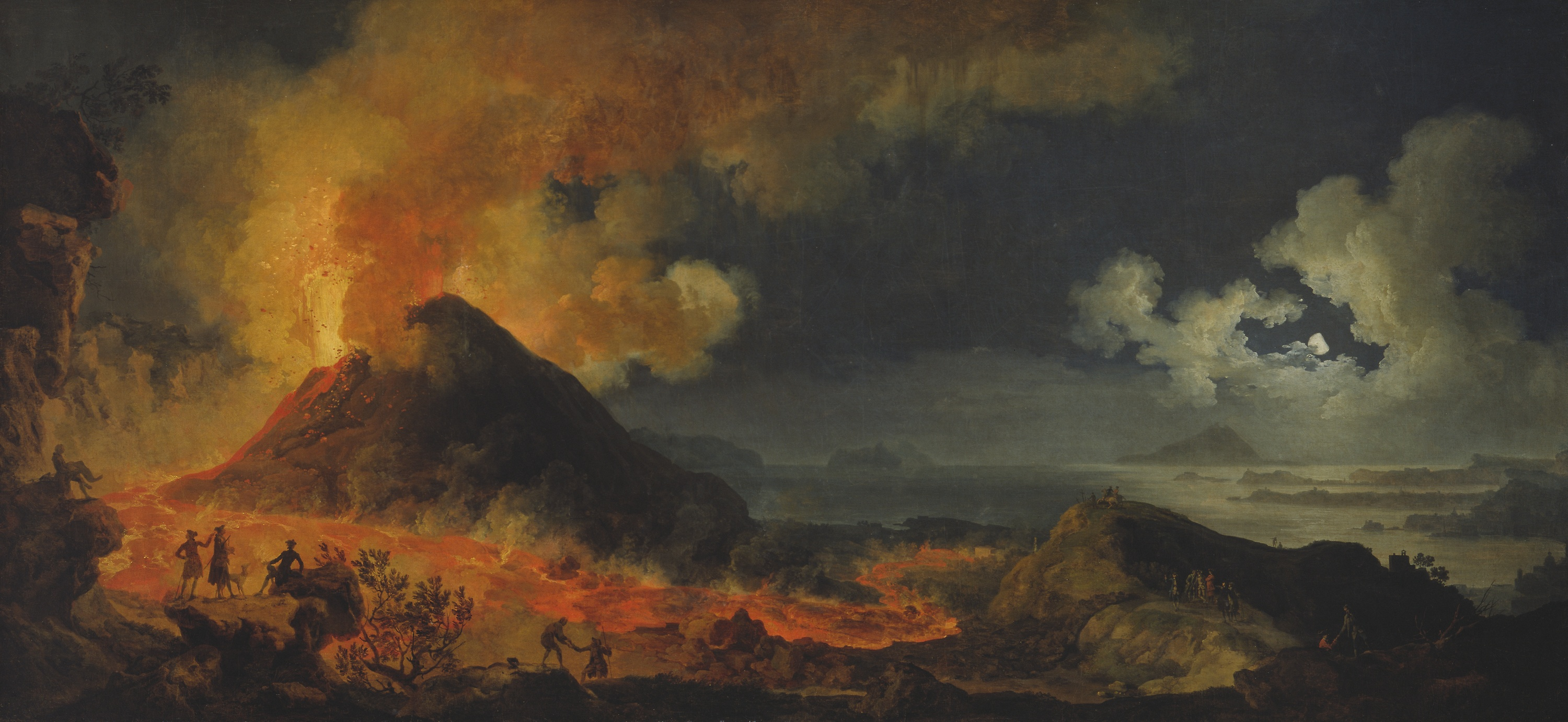
The Eruption of Vesuvius, 1771, Art Institute of Chicago, Chicago, Illinois, 1978.426

Pierre-Jacques Volaire (30 April 1729 – 1799/1802?) was a French painter.

Also referred to as le chevalier Volaire (the knight Volaire), he was born in Toulon as the son of the official city painter and writer, Jacques Volaire (1685-1768) and his second wife, Claire Marie Serre. Volaire's art career started when he became the pupil of Claude-Joseph Vernet in 1754, where he served as Vernet's assistant for eight years. Vernet was in France painting a series of seascapes for King Louis XV, which resulted in his Views of the Ports of France series (1754–1765). Despite his connections to Vernet, Volaire's exact artistic role in the series is uncertain. After serving under Vernet, Volaire left France for Rome in 1764, bringing with him his talents in landscape and seascape painting. He settled in Naples in 1769 where he lived until he died in 1799 or 1802.

== Personal life ==
Volaire married Vicenza Borelli (d. after 1799/1802) probably after arriving in Naples around 1769, and they had five children together: Giacomo (born 1775), Gennaro (born 1782), Maria Chiara (born 1785), Emanuele (born 1787), and Maria Rosa (born 1794). There is little else known about Volaire's personal life.

== Training under Joseph Vernet (1755-1762) and Rome (1763-1767/1768) ==
Volaire trained under French painter Claude-Joseph Vernet beginning in 1755, aiding the artist in his Ports of France series. He traveled with Vernet around southern France to aid in the painting series, eventually parting ways when Vernet returned to Paris in 1762.

After parting ways with Vernet, Volaire moved to Rome and continued to paint seascapes and port scenes. He applied to the Academy of Saint-Luc in Rome, where he ultimately attended from 1764 to 1767. In October 1767, Volaire witnessed a violent eruption of Mount Vesuvius while on a visit to Naples, sparking his interest in capturing the volcano. He moved to the city sometime after this event.

== Volaire in Naples (1769 – death) ==
Using his training in landscape painting under Vernet, Pierre-Jacques Volaire became a specialist in depictions of Mount Vesuvius in eruption. During his lifetime, Volaire completed at least thirty Vesuvius paintings, many of which are now housed in museums around the world. These paintings were inspired by Volaire's many visits to the summit of Vesuvius, which was particularly active during the second half of the eighteenth century.

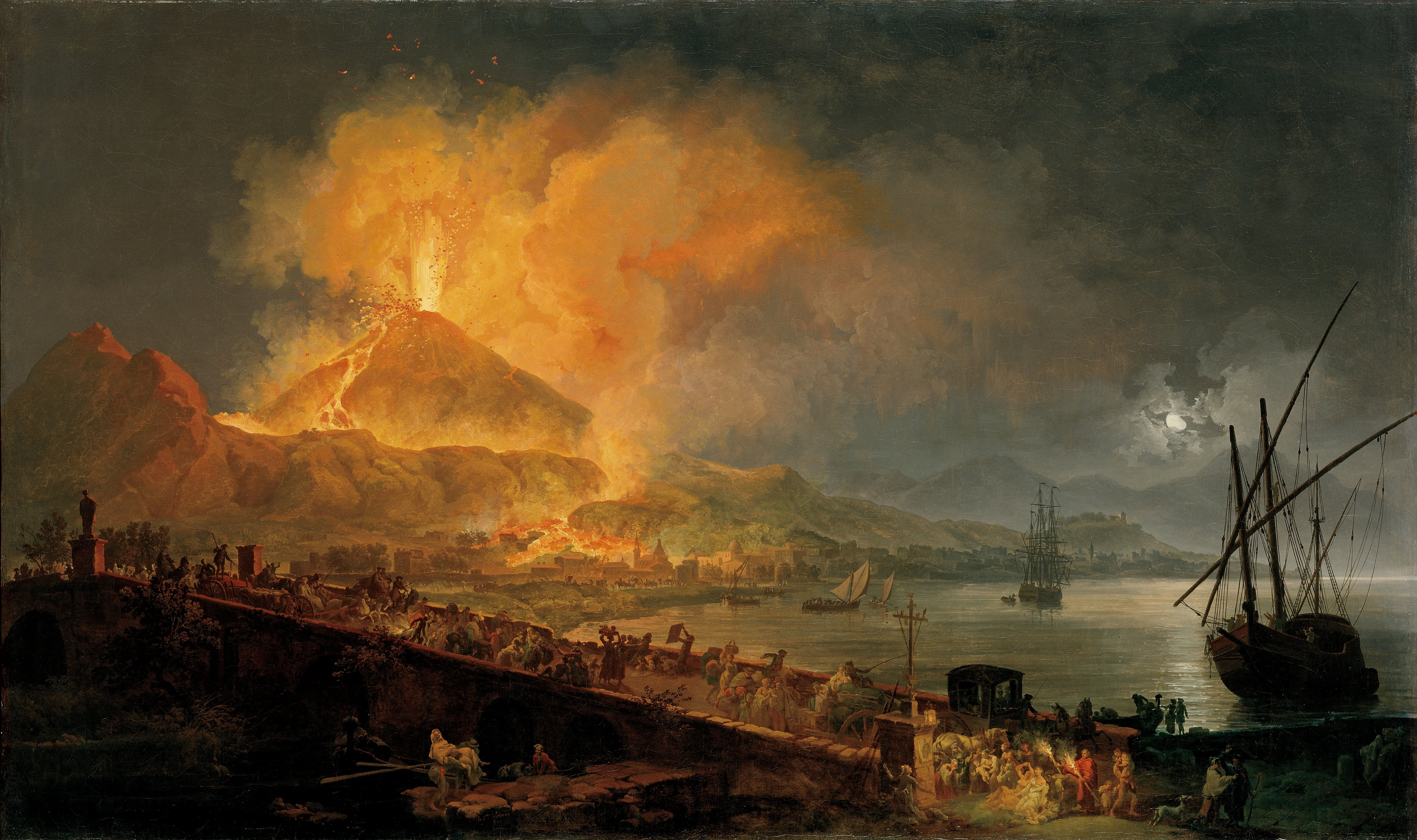
Eruption of Mt. Vesuvius, 1777, North Carolina Museum of Art, Raleigh, North Carolina, 82.1

Volaire's Vesuvius paintings were typically commissioned by tourists on the Grand Tour, who sought to commemorate their visit to the volcano. Volaire was oftentimes hired as a guide to accompany tourists to Vesuvius, including Charles Townley. Bergeret de Grancourt wrote of Volaire when he visited Vesuvius on 23 April 1774, “I was with a painter named M. Volaire [Pierre-Jacques Volaire] who succeeded superbly in rendering the horror of Vesuvius, of which I will bring back a painting”. It is unknown what happened to de Grancourt's painting.

Over the course of thirty years Volaire witnessed at least two major eruptions of Vesuvius, including the one in 1779 and 1794. These eruptions, coupled with recent archaeological re-discoveries at Pompeii and Herculaneum, drew tourists to the Naples region and funded Volaire's career in Naples.

Volaire died at the age of eighty on 19 September 1799, and is buried in the Chiesa di Santa Maria in Portico.

== Influences and Works ==
Volaire's nighttime eruption paintings fit nicely within the greater sublime landscape style that was popular during the latter part of the eighteenth century. His works inspired other landscape painters such as Joseph Wright of Derby, Philipp Hackert, and Charles LaCroix de Marseille. Wright likely never witnessed a major eruption of Vesuvius in his short time in Naples (October 1774), so he took inspiration from the likes of Volaire's paintings.

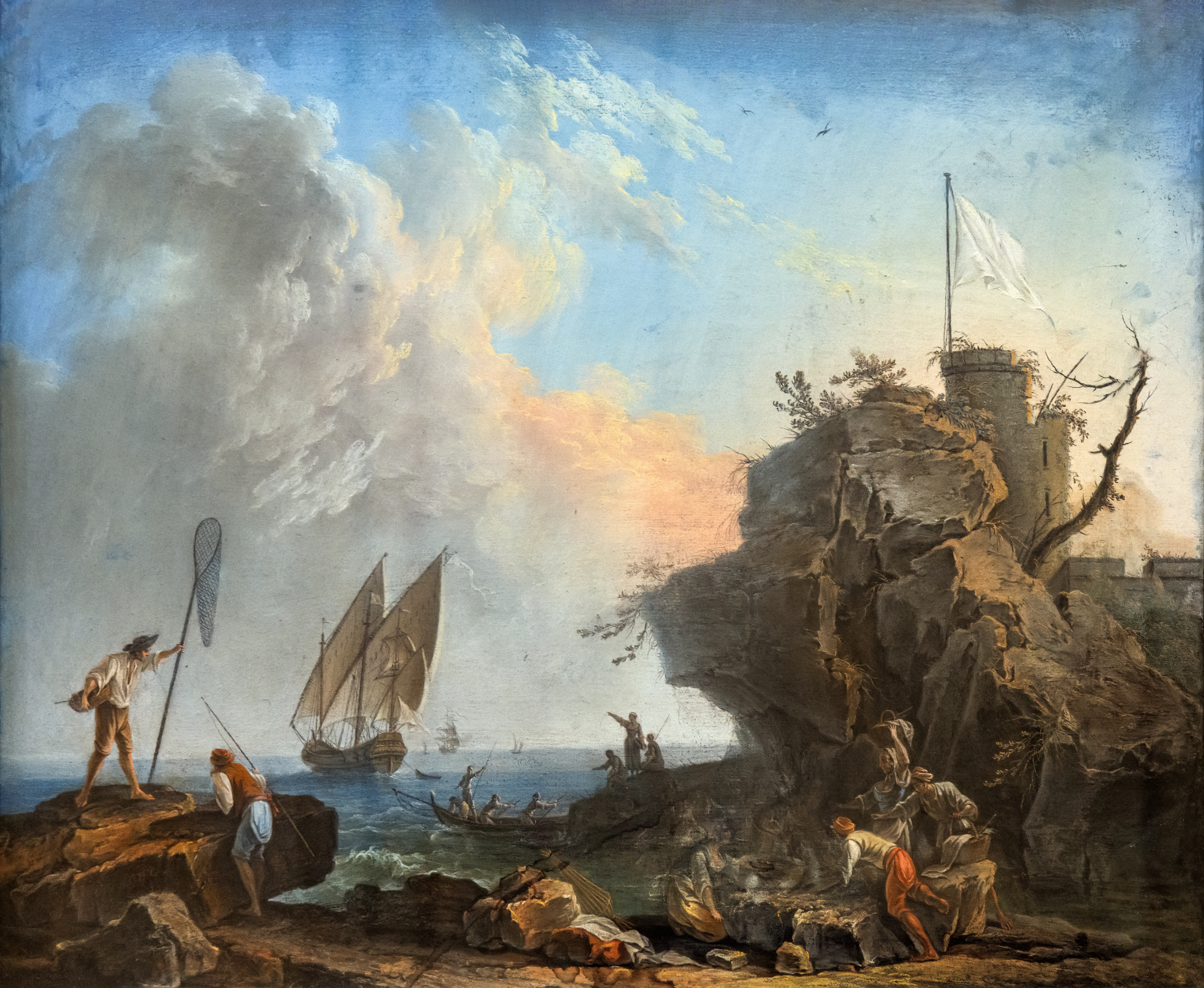
View of the shores of the Mediterranean, Musée des Beaux-Arts d'Agen, Agen, France

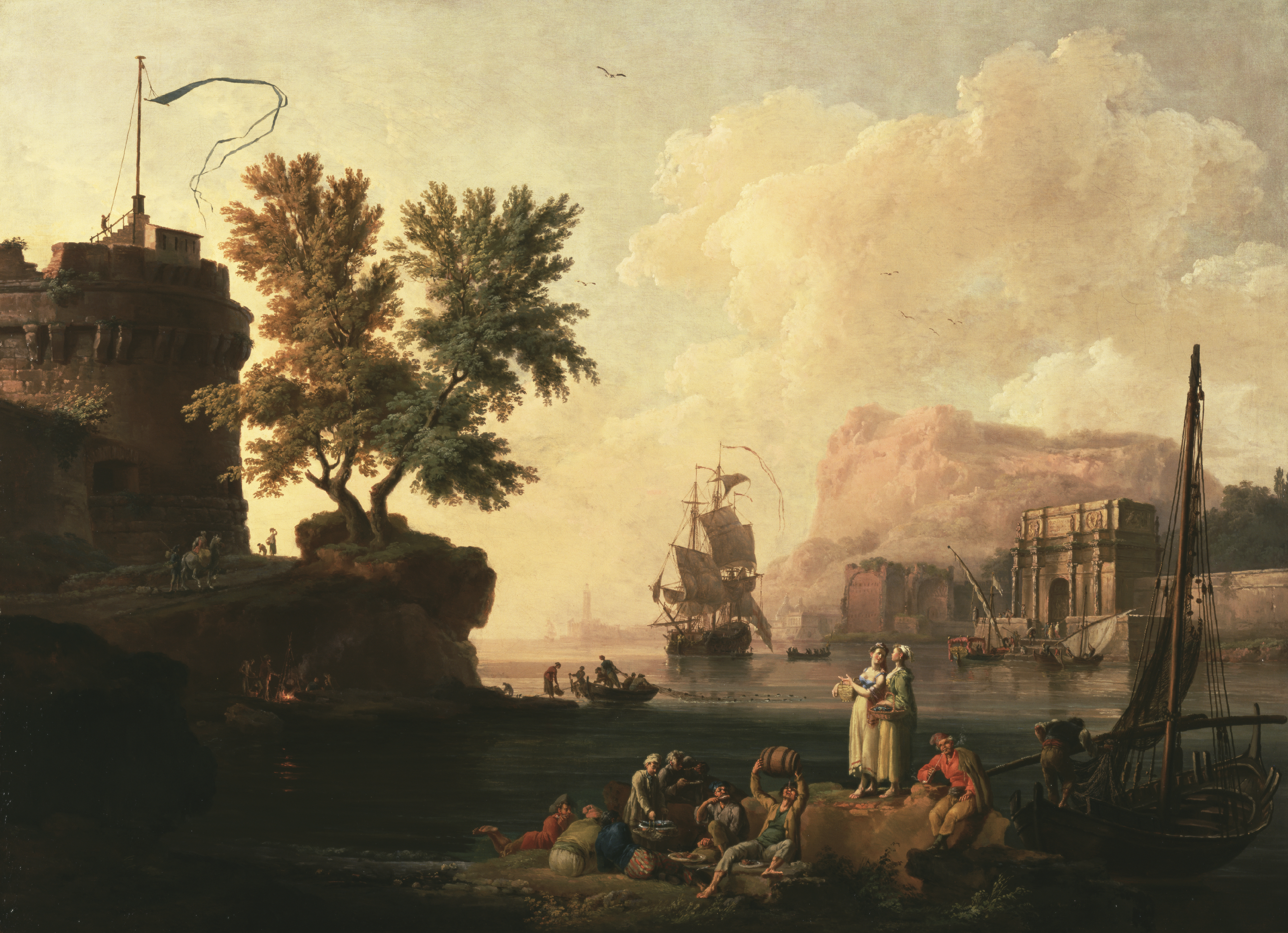
Mediterranean Harbor Scene, ca. 1763, J. Paul Getty Museum, Los Angeles, California, 78.PA.209

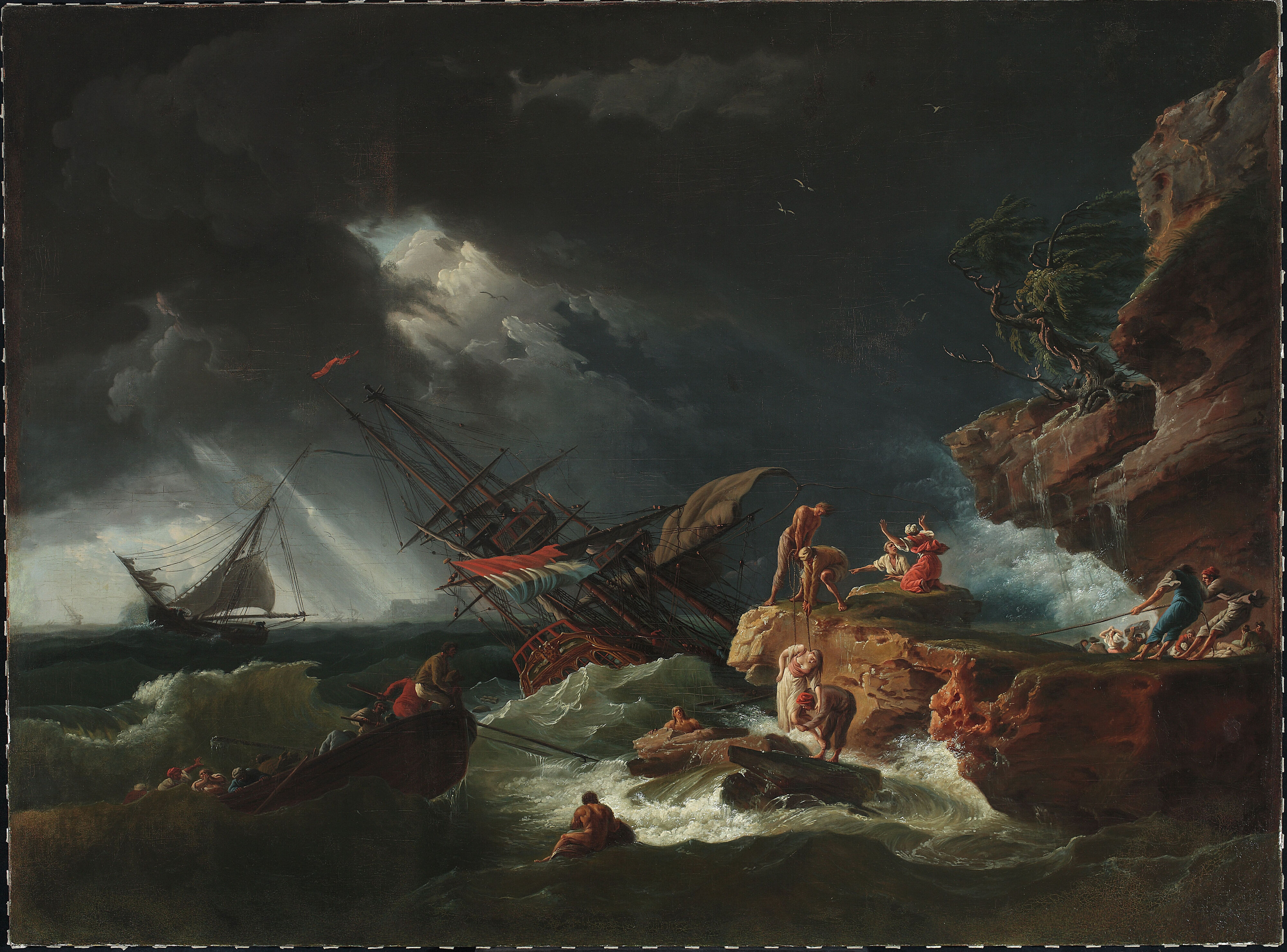
Castaways on the Sea, ca. 1763-1768, National Museum in Warsaw, Warsaw, Poland, M.Ob.1334 MNW

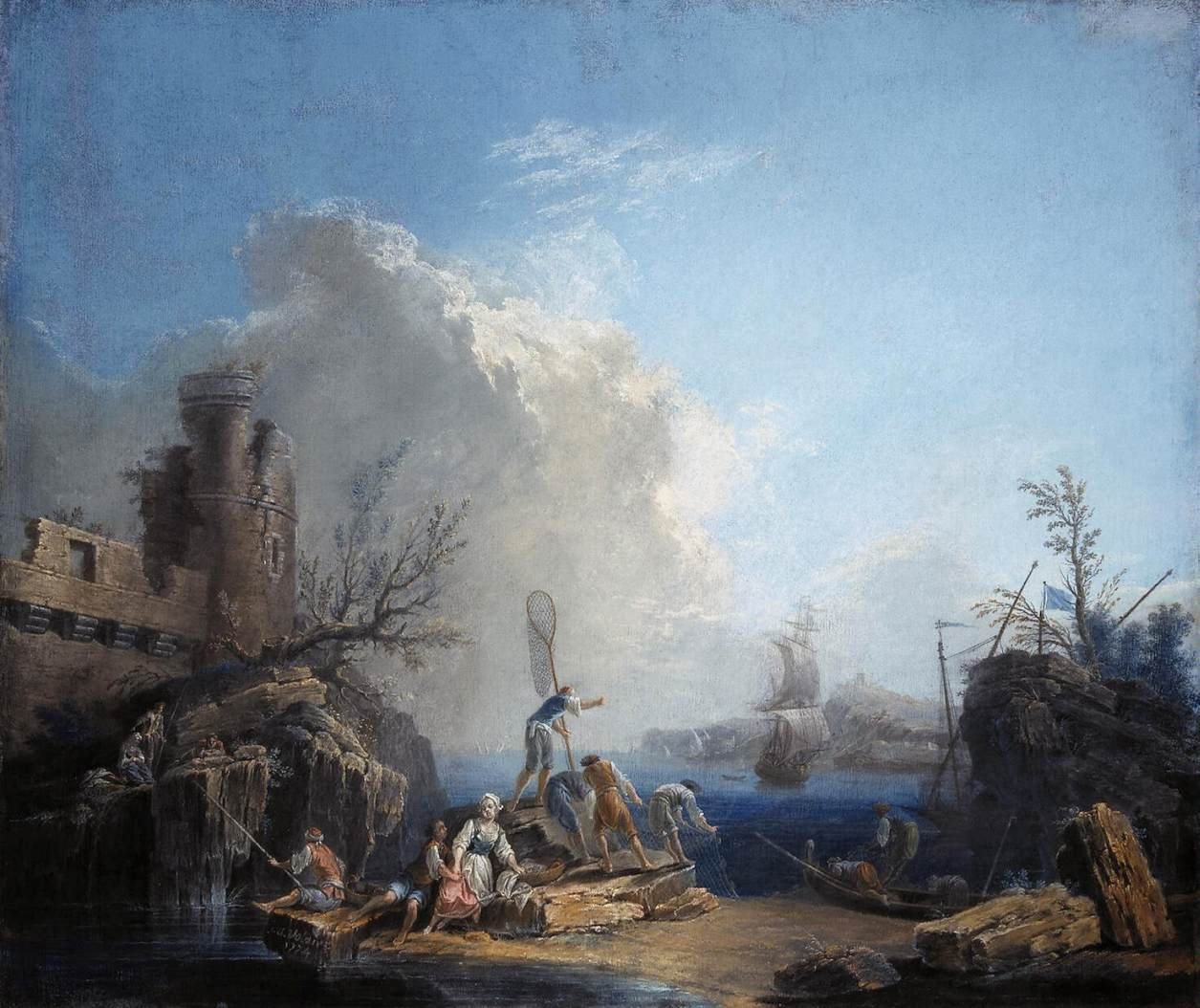
Seascape with Fishermen on a Rocky Shore, 1774, State Hermitage Museum, Saint Petersburg, Russia

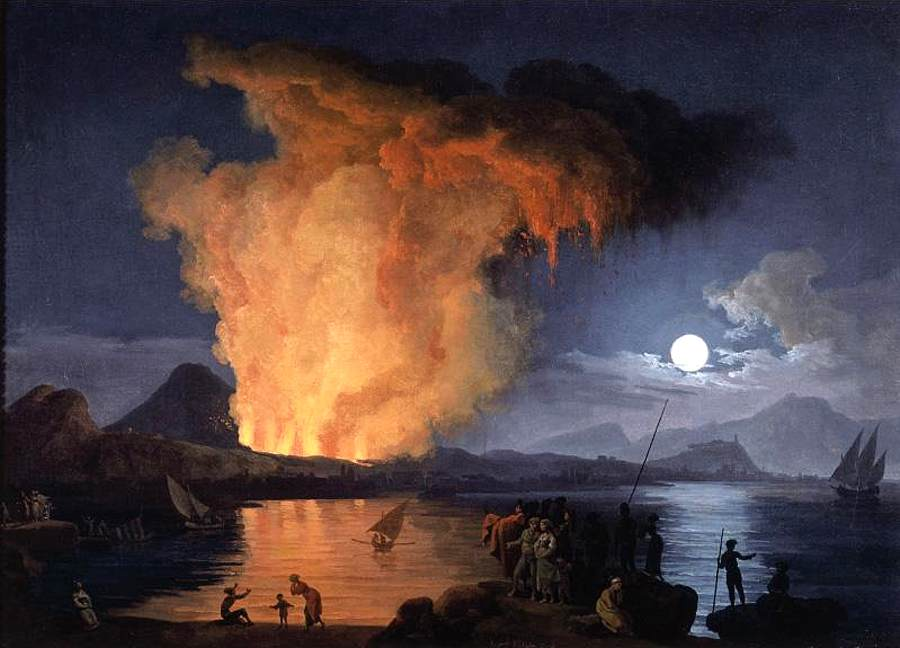
Eruption of Mount Vesuvius

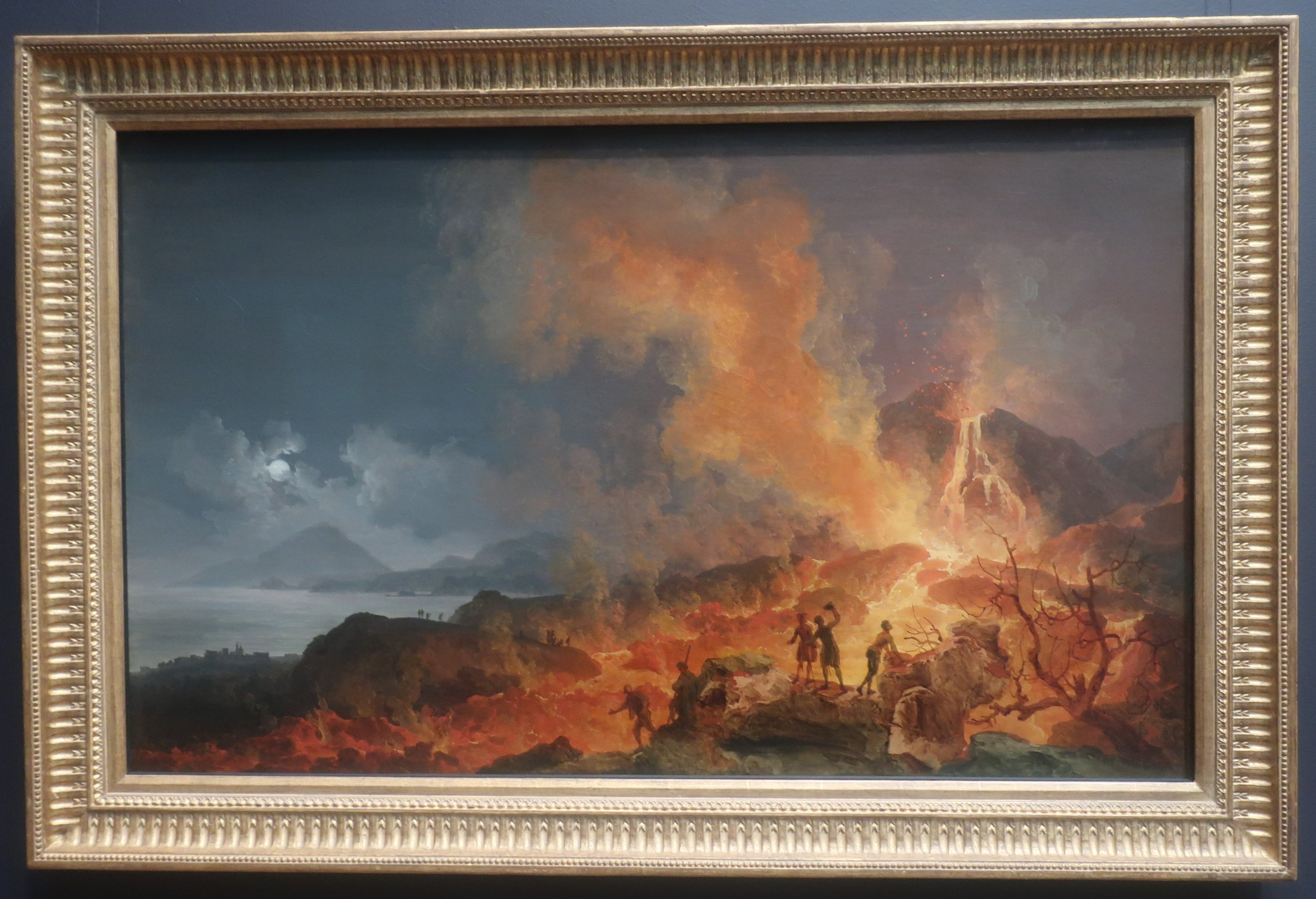
The Eruption of Vesuvius, A View of Naples Beyond, 1776, Metropolitan Museum of Art (on loan), New York, New York, L.2023.24.2

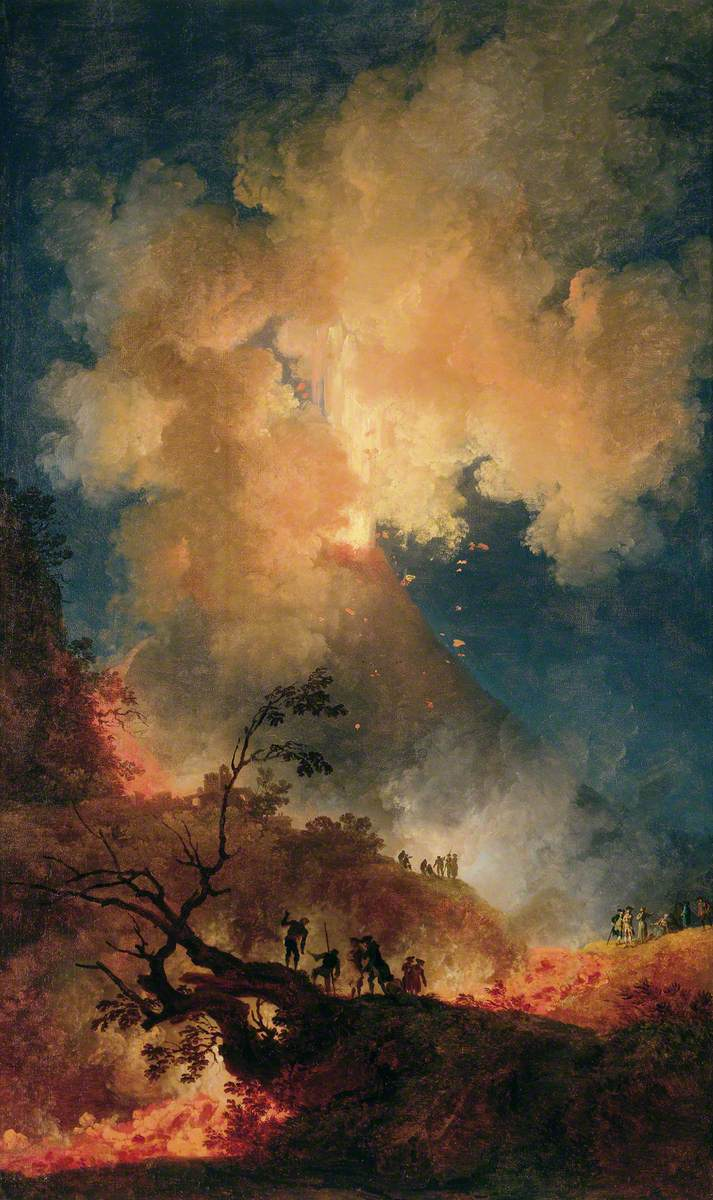
Vesuvius Erupting at Night, 1770s, Compton Verney, Warwickshire, United Kingdom, CVCSC:0343.S

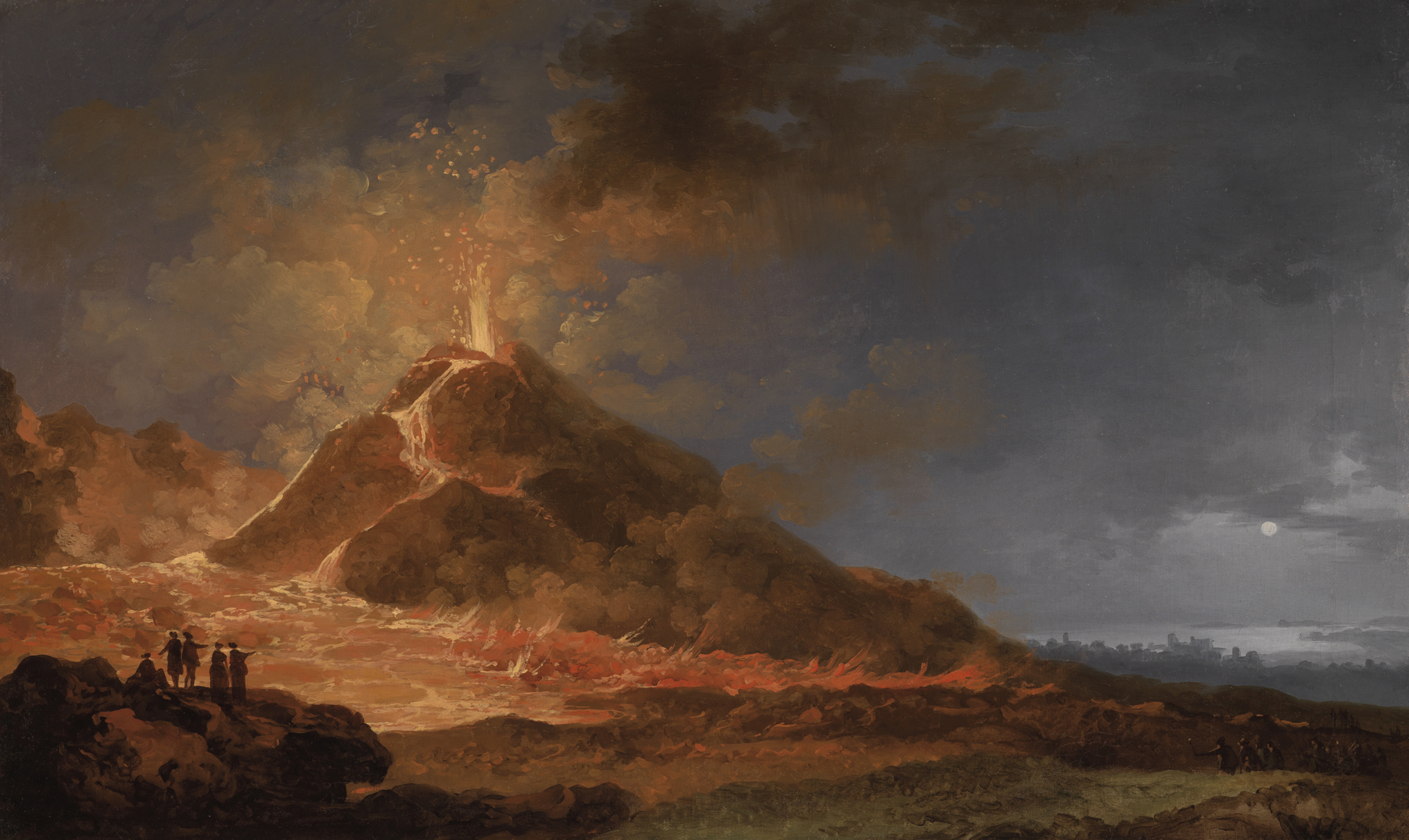
Eruption of Vesuvius, 14 May 1771, ca. 1771, Staatliche Kunsthalle Karlsruhe, Karlsruhe, Germany, inv. 2850

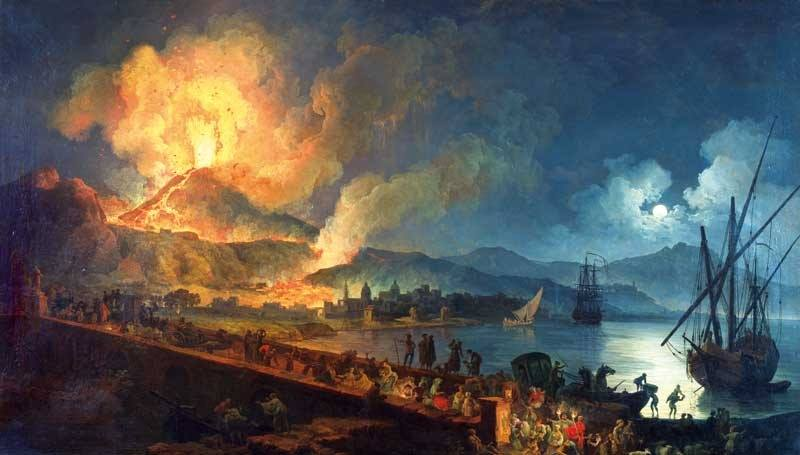
Eruzione del Vesuvio del 1771 o 1779 [alt: Eruzione del Vesuvio dal ponte della Maddalena], ca. 1782?, Museo di Capodimonte, Naples, Italy, inv. S 84049

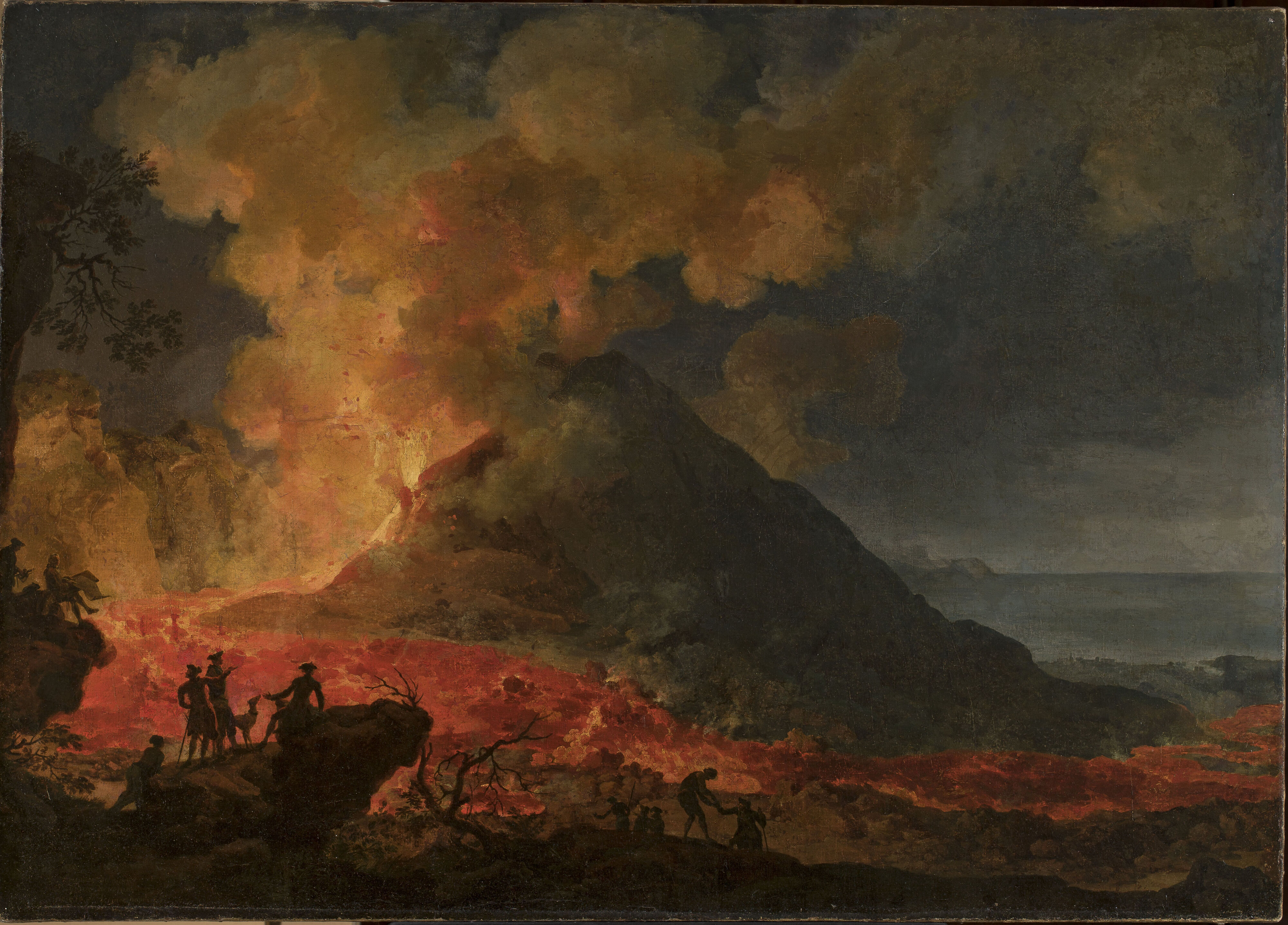
Eruption of Vesuvius, 1771, National Museum in Warsaw, Warsaw, Poland, M.Ob.2762 MNW
