= Villa Pignatelli =

Coordinates: 40°50′06″N 14°14′01″E

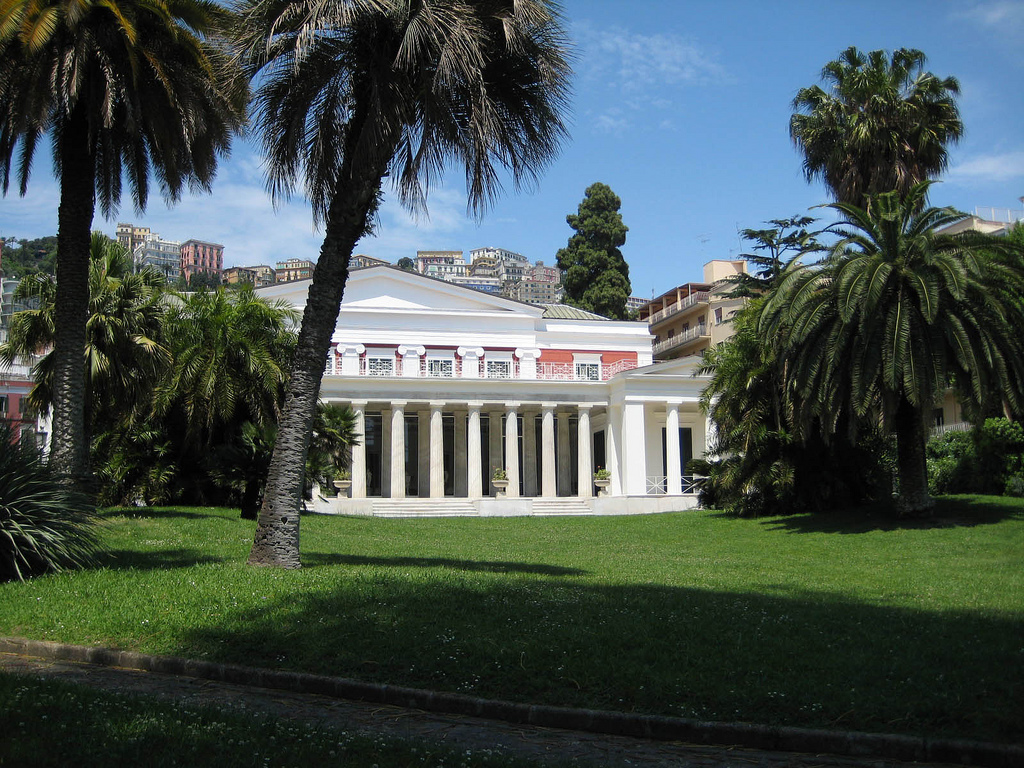
- Villa Pignatelli in Naples
- Established: 1952
- Location: Largo Principessa Rosina Pignatelli, 201 - 80121 Naples, Italy
- Type: Art museum, Historic site
- Website: Museo Pignatelli official website

The Villa Pignatelli is a museum in Naples in Southern Italy. The villa is located along the Riviera di Chiaia, the road bounding the north side of the Villa Comunale on the sea front between Mergellina and Piazza Vittoria.

== History and decoration ==
The villa was commissioned by admiral Ferdinand Acton in 1826 as a Neoclassical residence that would be the centerpiece of a park. The design was completed by the architect Pietro Valente. The central atrium was moved to the front of the building and Doric columns still catch the eye of the viewer from the street 50 yards (46 m) away. In the square in front of Villa Pignatelli there is the monument "Il pescatore" created in bronze by the sculptor Giovanni De Martino in 1920. The statue depicts a fisherman attempting to catch a crab.

The architect Guglielmo Bechi designed the interior decorations of the apartments and the marble entrance staircase. He recruited sculptors to complete the Neoclassical depiction of Alcibides and the Hounds.

The property has changed hands since construction: upon the death of Acton in 1841, it was bought by Carl Mayer von Rothschild of the German family of financiers. His monogram of CR can be seen in the first floor. For a time it was used by the Jewish community of Naples for services. In 1867, it was sold to the Duke of Monteleón, Diego Pignatelli Aragona y Cortes, whose widow the Princess Rosa Fici of the Dukes of Amafi then willed it to the Italian state in 1952, with instructions that the house and its possessions not be altered. The villa maintains the gardens in front of the building, and houses a coach museum and a collection of French and English vehicles from the 18th and 19th centuries.

In 1975, the Principe Diego Aragona Pignatelli Cortés Museum and the Carriage Museum located in the northern part of the garden were inaugurated.
