= Sant'Orsola a Chiaia =

Church of Sant'Orsola a Chiaia
- Chiesa di Sant'Orsola a Chiaia
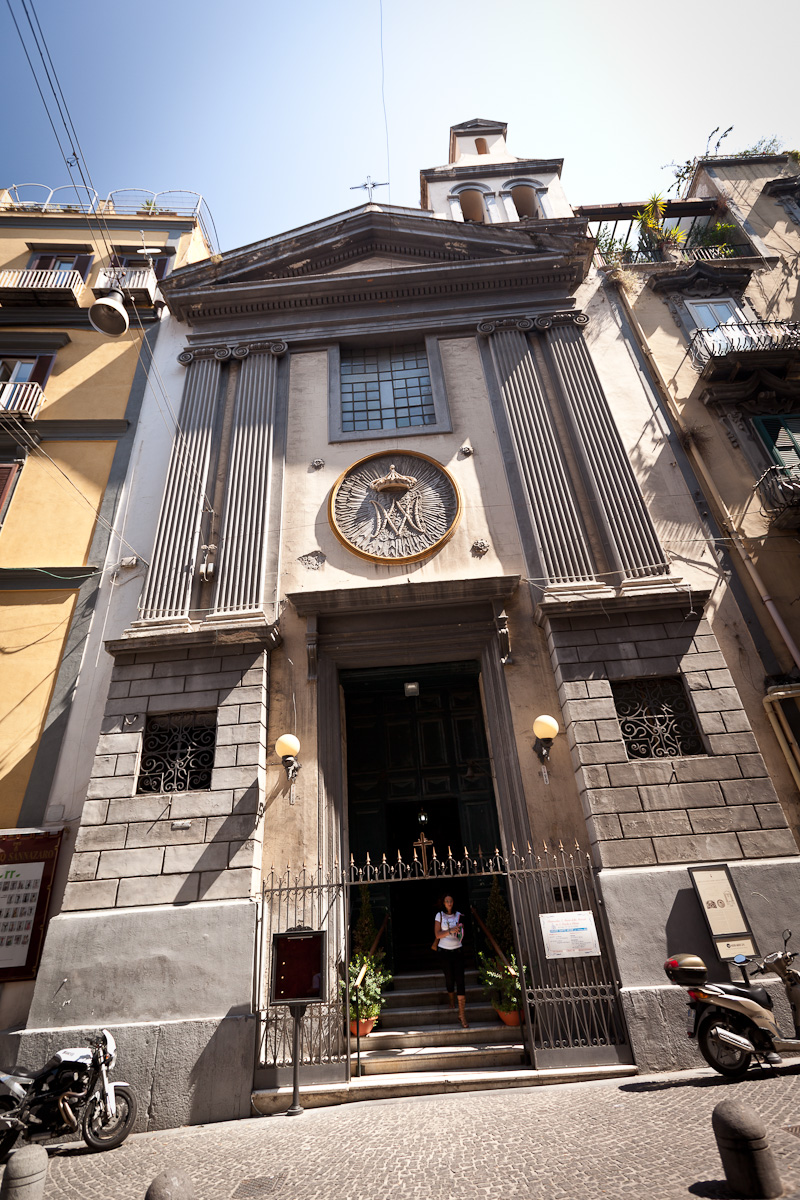
- The façade of church of Sant'Orsola a Chiaia.
- Church of Sant'Orsola a Chiaia
- 40.836100°N 14.243650°E
- Location: Largo Sant'Orsola; Naples; Province of Naples, Campania
- Country: Italy
- Denomination: Roman Catholic

History
- Status: Active

Architecture
- Architectural type: Church

Administration
- Diocese: Roman Catholic Archdiocese of Naples

Sant'Orsola a Chiaia (also called Sant'Orsola dei Mercedari Spagnoli, or the Parish church of Santa Maria della Mercede a Chiaia) is a church in largo Sant'Orsola in the quartieri of Chiaia in Naples, Italy.

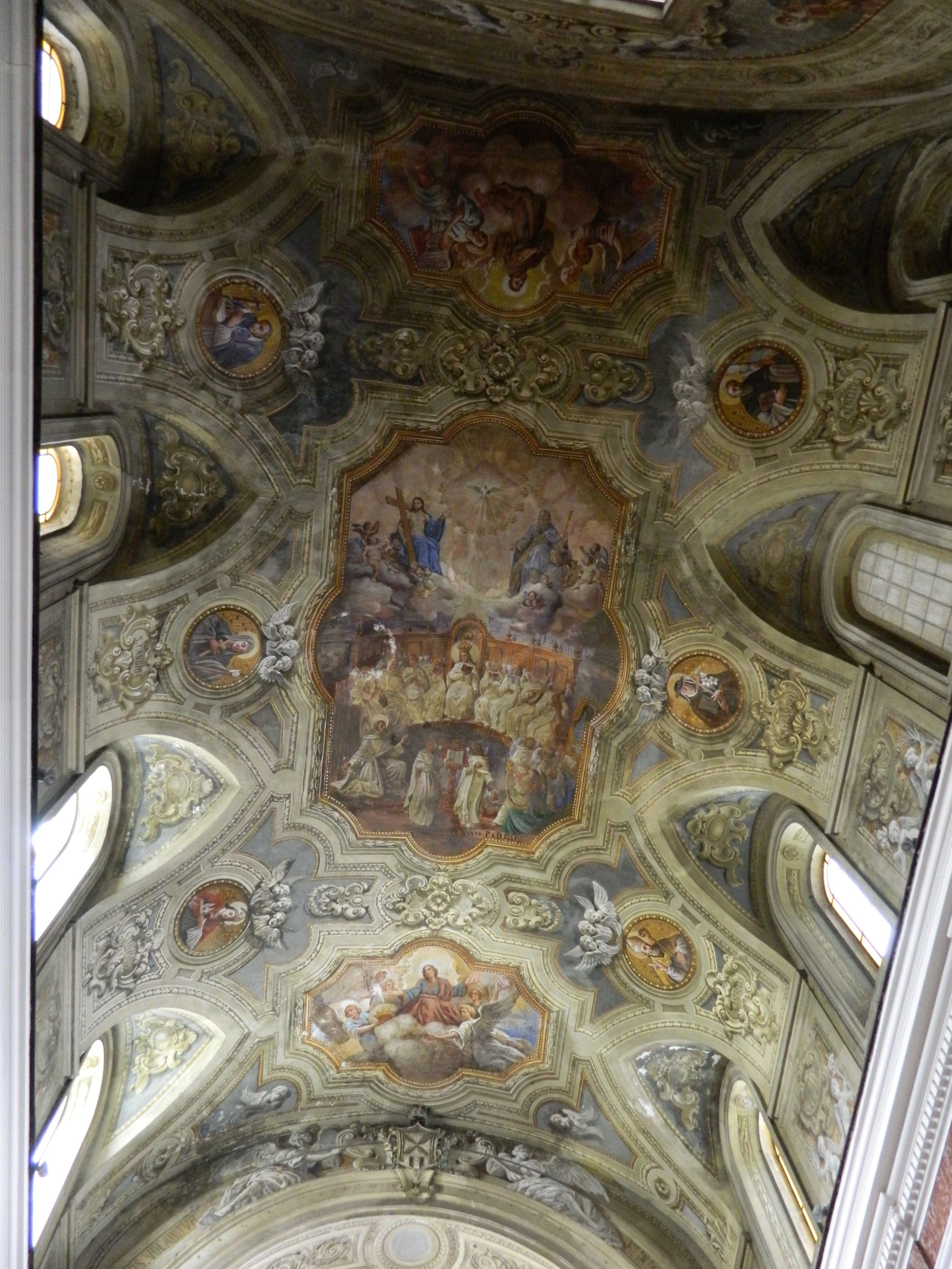
Ceiling.

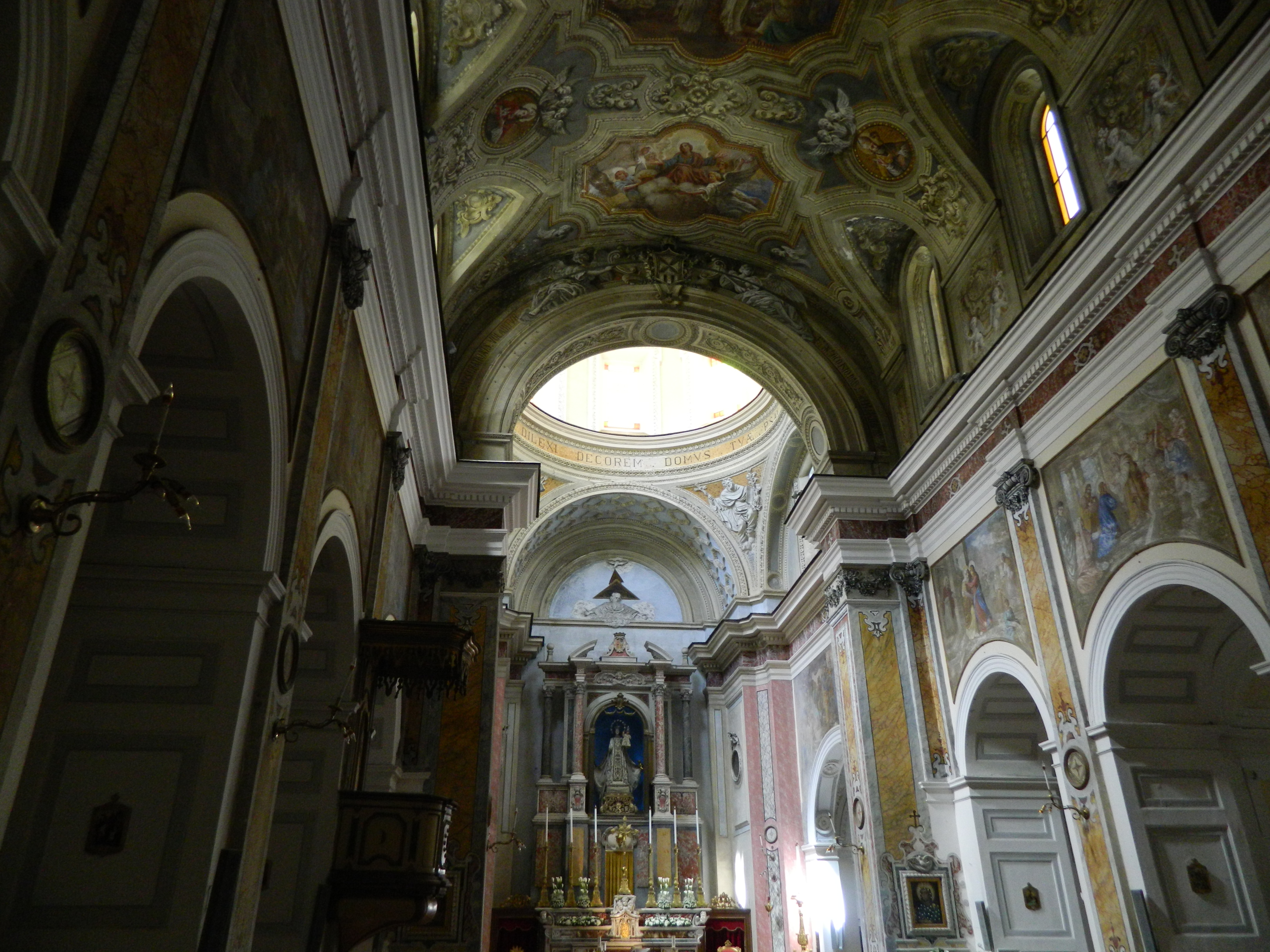
Interior.

Originally, this was the site of a small 16th-century chapel endowed by the Spaniard Annibale de Troyanis y Mortella and dedicated to Saint Ursula. In 1569 it was donated to fathers of the Order of Santa Maria della Mercede, who in 1576 demolished the chapel to build a new convent. The church was reconstructed. In 1875, the cloister that held the tombs of the monks was demolished and the Teatro Sannazaro was built instead. The convent held Mercedari priests till 1923.

In the 19th century, the reconstruction added frescoes in the arches of the nave and ceiling, depicting Stories of the Virgin (1851) and Redemption of Captives (1852) by G. Gravante. In the transept are two canvases by unknown 16th-century artists.

== Bibliography ==
- Vincenzo Regina, Le chiese di Napoli. Viaggio indimenticabile attraverso la storia artistica, architettonica, letteraria, civile e spirituale della Napoli sacra, Newton e Compton editore, 2004.
