= Virgil's tomb =

Alleged tomb of Roman poet Virgil

Coordinates: 40°49′46.5″N 14°13′03.2″E

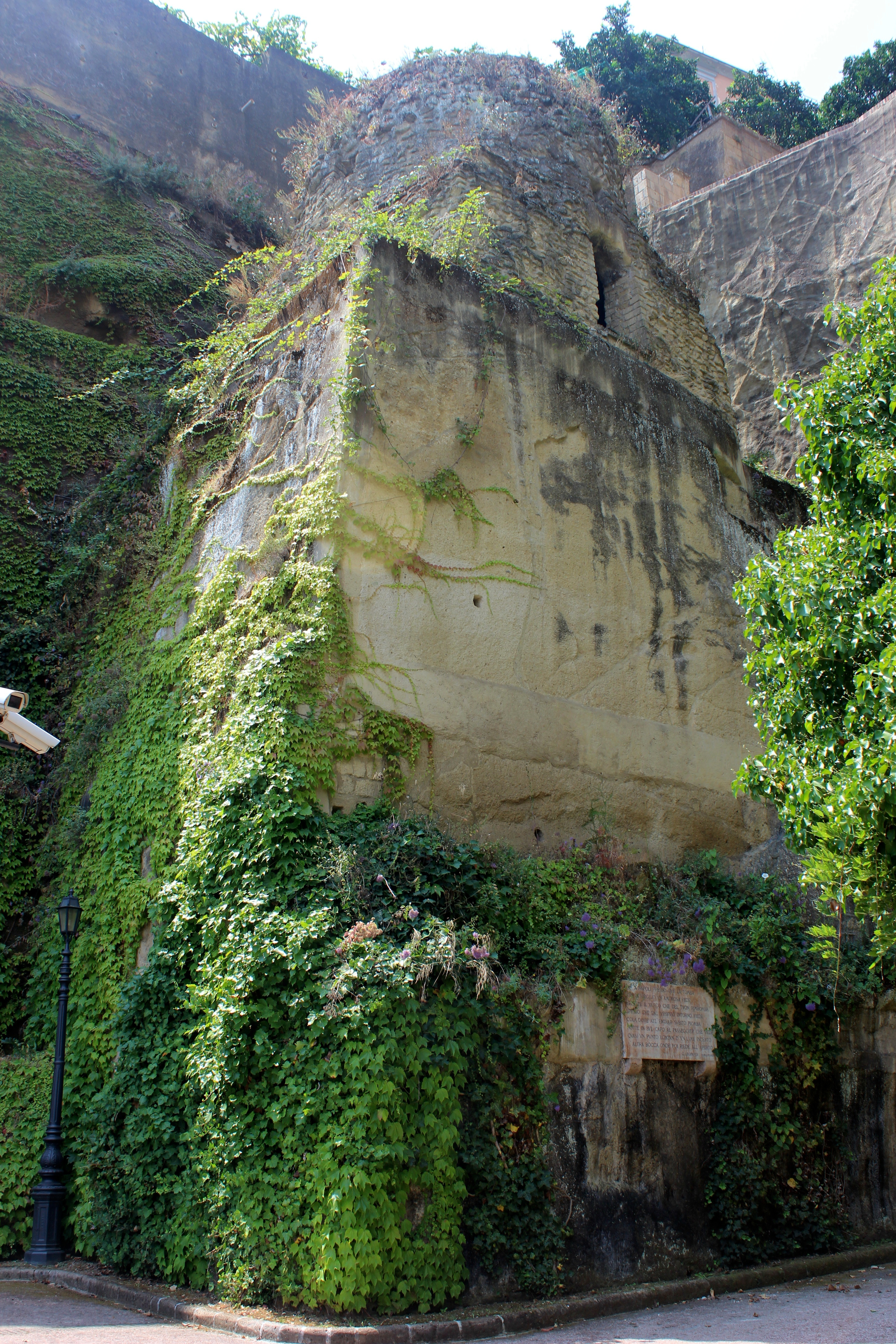
Virgil's Tomb

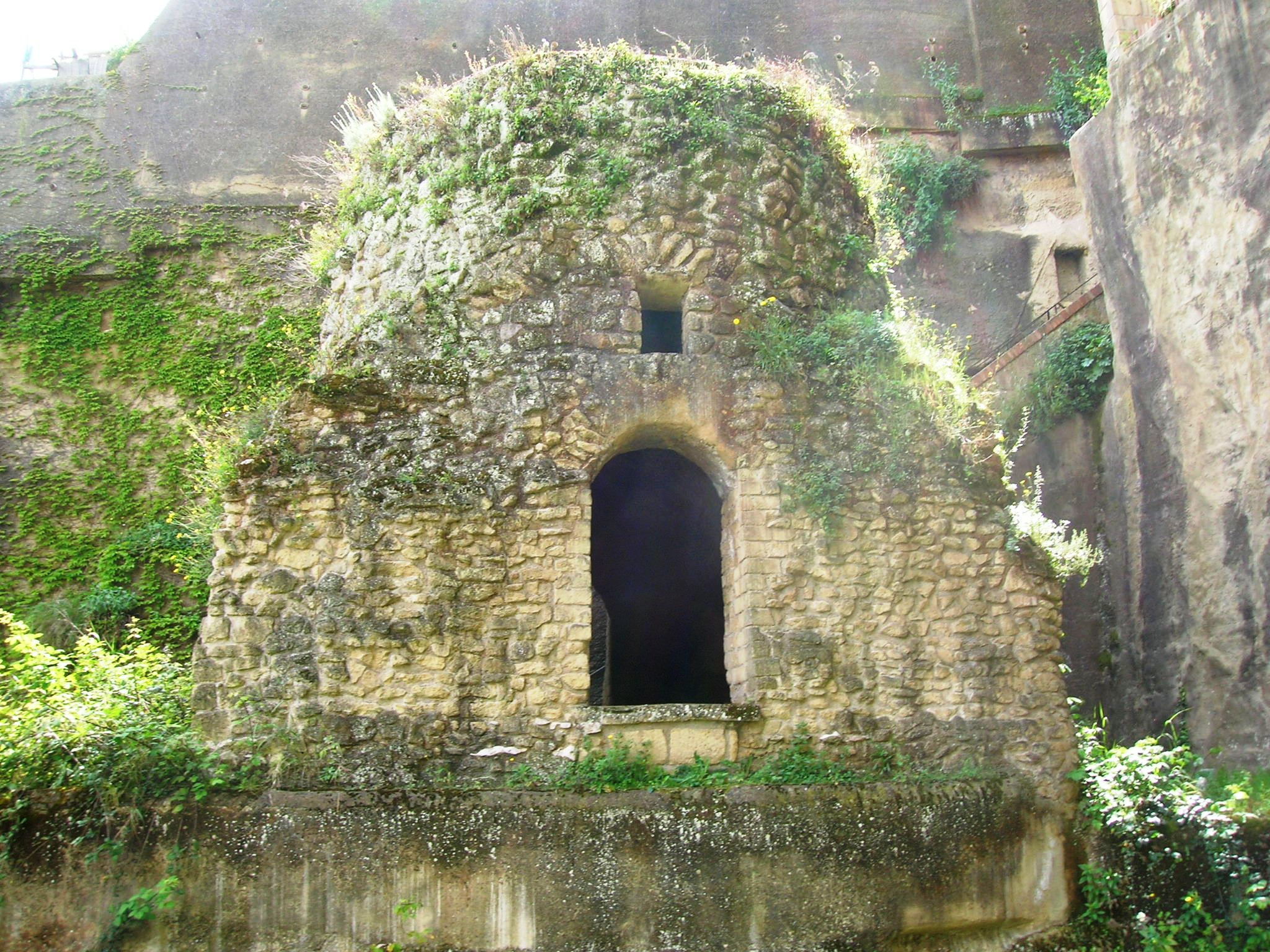
Virgil's Tomb

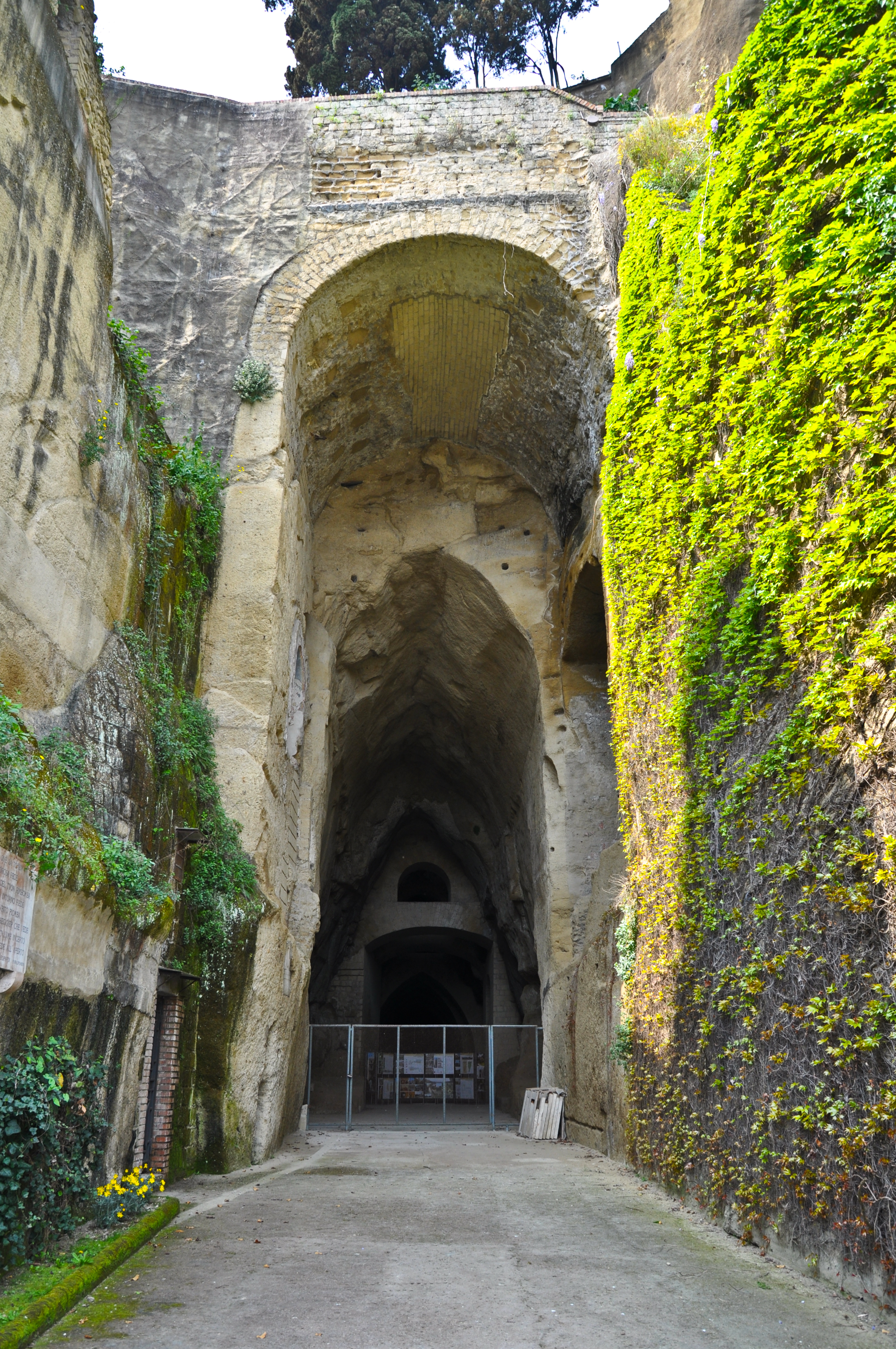
Piedigrotta entrance to Crypta Neapolitana tunnel

Virgil's tomb (Italian: Tomba di Virgilio) is a Roman burial vault in Naples, said to be the tomb of the poet Virgil (70–19 BCE). It is located at the entrance to the old Roman tunnel known as the Crypta Neapolitana or grotta vecchia in the Piedigrotta district of the city, between Mergellina and Fuorigrotta.

== History ==
Virgil was the object of literary admiration and veneration before his death. In the following centuries and particularly in the Middle Ages his name became associated with legends of miraculous powers and his tomb the object of pilgrimages and pagan veneration.

At the time of Virgil's death, a large bay tree was near the entrance. According to a local legend, it died when Dante died, and Petrarch planted a new one; because visitors took branches as souvenirs the second tree died as well.

== Virgil's death ==
When Virgil died at Brindisi in 19 BCE, he asked that his ashes be taken back to his villa just outside Naples. There a shrine was created for him, and sacred rites were held every year on his birthday. He was given the rites of a hero, at whose tomb the devout may find protection and counsel. Virgil's tomb became a place of pilgrimage for many centuries, with Petrarch and Boccaccio being among those who visited the tomb.

The tomb still contains a tripod burner originally dedicated to Apollo; there are no human remains in the tomb, however, as Virgil's ashes were lost while being moved during the Middle Ages.

== See also ==
- Virgil's Tomb (Joseph Wright paintings)
