= Laura Terracina =

Italian poet (1519–c.1577)

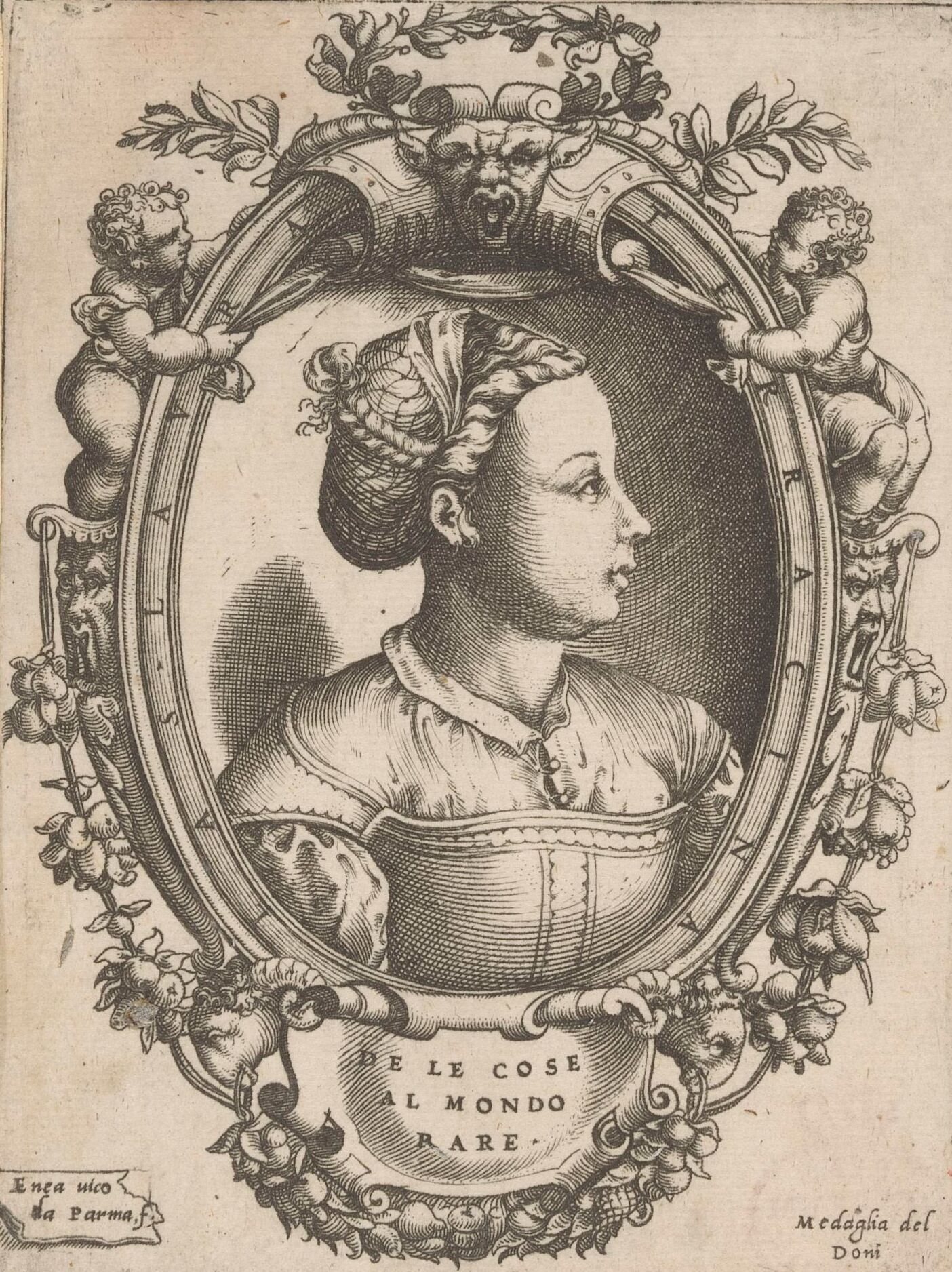
- Portrait of Laura Terracina by Enea Vico, 1550
- Born: 1519; Chiaia
- Died: c. 1577
- Occupation: Poet
- Spouse: Polidoro Terracina

Laura Terracina (sometimes Laura Bacio Terracina; 1519 – c. 1577) was a Neapolitan poet of the Renaissance. She was the most published Italian poet of the sixteenth century.

== Life ==
At first traceable to Brescia, Terracina's family moved to Rome in the thirteenth century, where they gained rights over the eponymous town from the Colonna or Corsini families for their assistance against the popes. By the fourteenth century, members of the Terracina family were fighting in the service of the Angevins in the Kingdom of Naples. Later, they were known for their extreme fidelity to the Spanish viceroys of Naples. Terracina herself wrote verse praising the Habsburg rulers of Naples and mocking their foes, such as Sultan Suleiman I and King Henry II of France.

Terracina was born in Chiaia, now a suburb of Naples. Her father was Paolo Terracina, lord of St Crispano and St Demetrio in the province of Lecce, while her mother was Diana Anfora of Sorrento. The couple had at least one more daughter and two sons.

In her youth, Terracina enjoyed a "neither complete nor profound" education in the classics, but was intellectually curious, and active in constructing a literary network, which she largely achieved by writing poetry in praise of its intended recipient. She received encouragement from the famous poet Vittoria Colonna, and exchanged poems of praise with Laura Battiferri, in which each woman praised the other, but trivialized their own talents. Such protestations of modesty were expected of female poets in sixteenth-century Italy, and were frequently voiced by them. However, Terracina expressed such claims less often than other female authors. She also sought to control the publication of her works, and used the press to bolster her intellectual profile and income.

Most significant in Terracina's early development was the Academia degli Incogniti in Naples, to which Terracina was admitted in 1545. She was one of the few women to be granted access to this society, but some of its members supported and praised her work. Her first volume of poetry was conceived as an offering to these early supporters, such as Luigi Tansillo, Marco Antonio Passero, Ludovico Domenichi, and Anton Francesco Doni. The academy was suppressed in 1547, but Terracina continued to be known by her pseudonym of Febea.

Nearing the age of 40 she married her relative Polidoro Terracina, who sought to benefit from her poetry by sending it to potential patrons or even compelling her to write. The couple are not known to have had any children.

== Work ==
Terracina's poetry first appeared in print in 1546, in Dominichi's anthology Rime diverse di molti eccellentissimi autori. Thereafter, eight volumes of her poetry were published in Florence, Venice, Naples, and Lucca between 1548 and 1567.

The first volume of Terracina's poetry was published in Venice in 1548, with a preface by its editor Domenichi. Terracina's biographer Claudio Mutini referred to this first volume as "superficial", but noted that its thematic variety and spontaneity was popular in Terracina's time. By contrast, Meredith Ray has seen this first volume as a challenging collection that broke from earlier editions of poetry by female authors. Whereas earlier female poets like Colonna had appeared in print as widows and had written primarily about religious themes, Terracina was presented to the public as a talented young woman, whose poetry dealt with practical matters that were familiar from the daily lives of the female patrons to whom they were addressed, such as Giovanna d'Aragona and Isabella Colonna. The collection was printed a further five times in the sixteenth century, and excepts from it included in Domenichi's anthology of poetry by female authors. A second volume of verse, published in Florence in 1549, was less commercially successful.

Besides this second volume of poetry, in 1549 Terracina's Discorso sopra il principio di tutti i canti di Orlando furioso was printed in Venice. This was a collection of 46 verses, the final lines of each of which were taken from the first lines of each canto of Ludovico Ariosto's chivalric romance Orlando Furioso. Terracina adapted Ariosto's verses in the Discorso, rewriting and expanding on them in order to reflect on a range of moral topics. In particular, she targeted injustices committed by men upon women, lamenting the physical and sexual violence that women faced, as well as the excision of women from the historical record and the misogyny of much writing that had been chosen for preservation. Terracina encouraged women to abandon work that had been traditionally reserved for them, and to write themselves instead of relying on male authors to defend them.

The Discorso was Terracina's most celebrated work. It was reprinted more than twenty times before 1600, and was sometimes used in classrooms in place of Ariosto's Orlando furioso. Terracina followed the Discorso with a fourth volume of poetry in 1550, and a fifth and sixth were printed in 1552 and 1560. A seventh volume followed in 1561, whose subject was the widows of Naples. She and her husband were pressured by her publisher Valvassori to produce a second volume of commentaries on Ariosto, which appeared in 1567. The final volume of Terracina's poetry, dedicated to Ferdinando de' Medici, remained unpublished in her lifetime, and was only printed in 2021.

The quality of Terracina's poetry has been unfavourably compared to that of other contemporaries such as Vittoria Colonna. Her signatures are instead her productivity and fame in her time, her use of poetry to social and financial ends, and her concern with the condition of women in the past and present. Terracina's poetry changed through time, with her later work being marked by a heavier focus on religion, likely reflecting the changed expectations about female authors in Italy caused by the Counter-Reformation.
