= Riviera di Chiaia =

Coastal road in Naples, Italy

Coordinates: 40°50′01″N 14°14′01″E

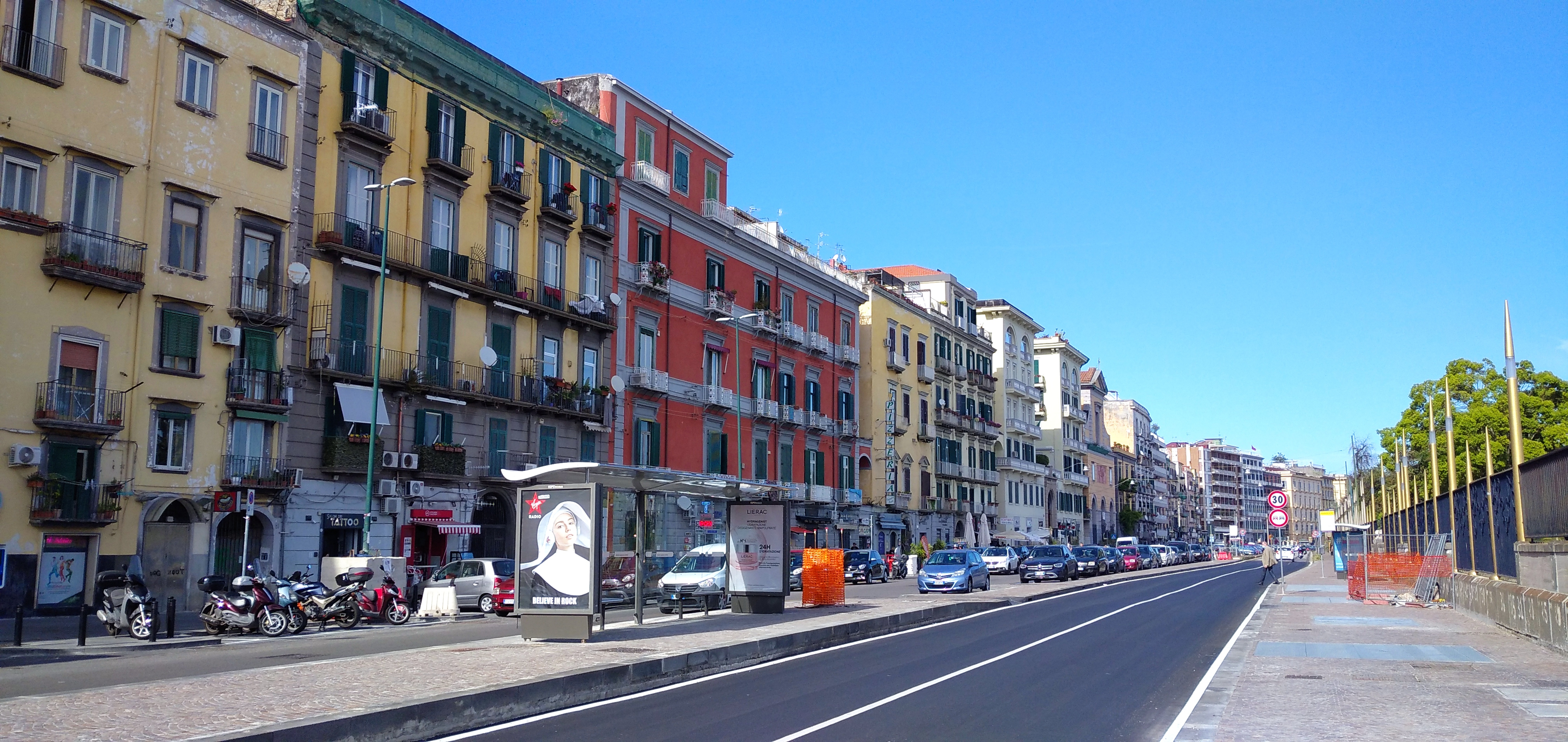
Riviera di Chiaia

The Riviera di Chiaia (Chiaia's Riviera) is a long street in the Italian city of Naples, running along the coast of the Gulf of Naples.

On this street there are many ancient villas built by aristocratic families between the 16th and 19th centuries, such as the Villa Pignatelli. The Chiesa di Santa Maria in Portico is nearby.

Mark Twain calls this street "Riviere di Chiaja" in his book The Innocents Abroad.
