= Villa Comunale =

Park in Naples, southern Italy

Coordinates: 40°49′58.8″N 14°13′56.0″E

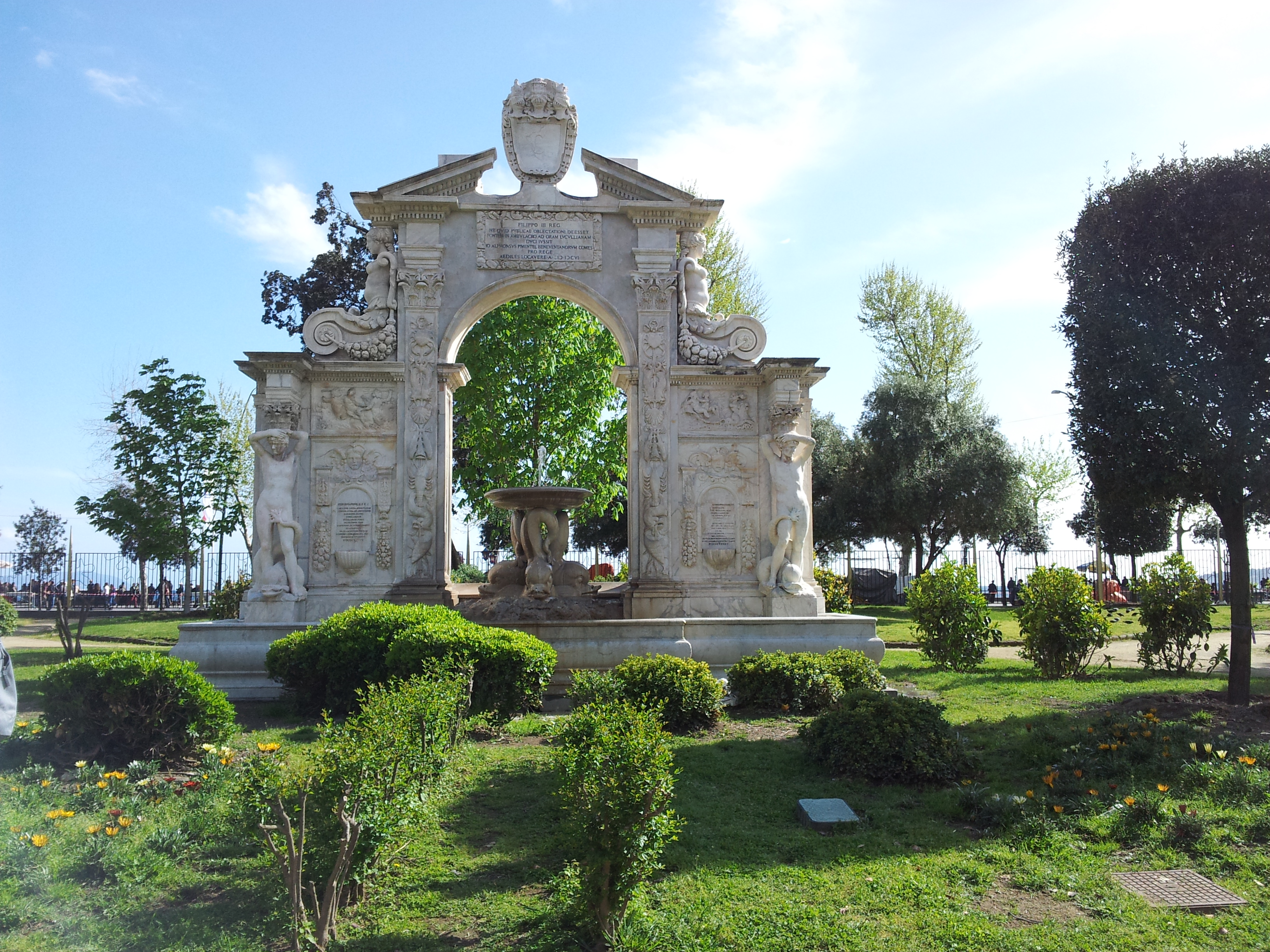
One of the many fountains in the Villa Comunale of Naples.

The Villa Comunale is a park in Naples, Southern Italy. It was built in the 1780s by King Ferdinand IV (later known as Ferdinand I of the Two Sicilies) on land reclaimed along the coast between the main body of the city and the small port of Mergellina. The park was originally a "Royal Garden", reserved for members of the royal family, but open to the public on special holidays such as the Festival of Piedigrotta. The park was opened to the general public on a permanent basis in 1869 after the unification of Italy.

The park houses the Anton Dohrn aquarium, a renowned scientific institution built in the 1870s. The seaside road, via Caracciolo, which now lies between the aquarium and the sea, is another more recent reclamation project added to the city in 1900 to provide another connecting road between the city and the suburbs to the west.

The Villa Comunale Park stretches over 1 km (0.62 mi) through an area of land between Pizzofalcone and Posillipo Hills and follows the curve of the bay from Piazza Vittoria to Piazza della Repubblica.
