= Santa Maria del Parto a Mergellina =

Church of Holy Mary of Childbirth in Mergellina
- Chiesa di Santa Maria del Parto a Mergellina
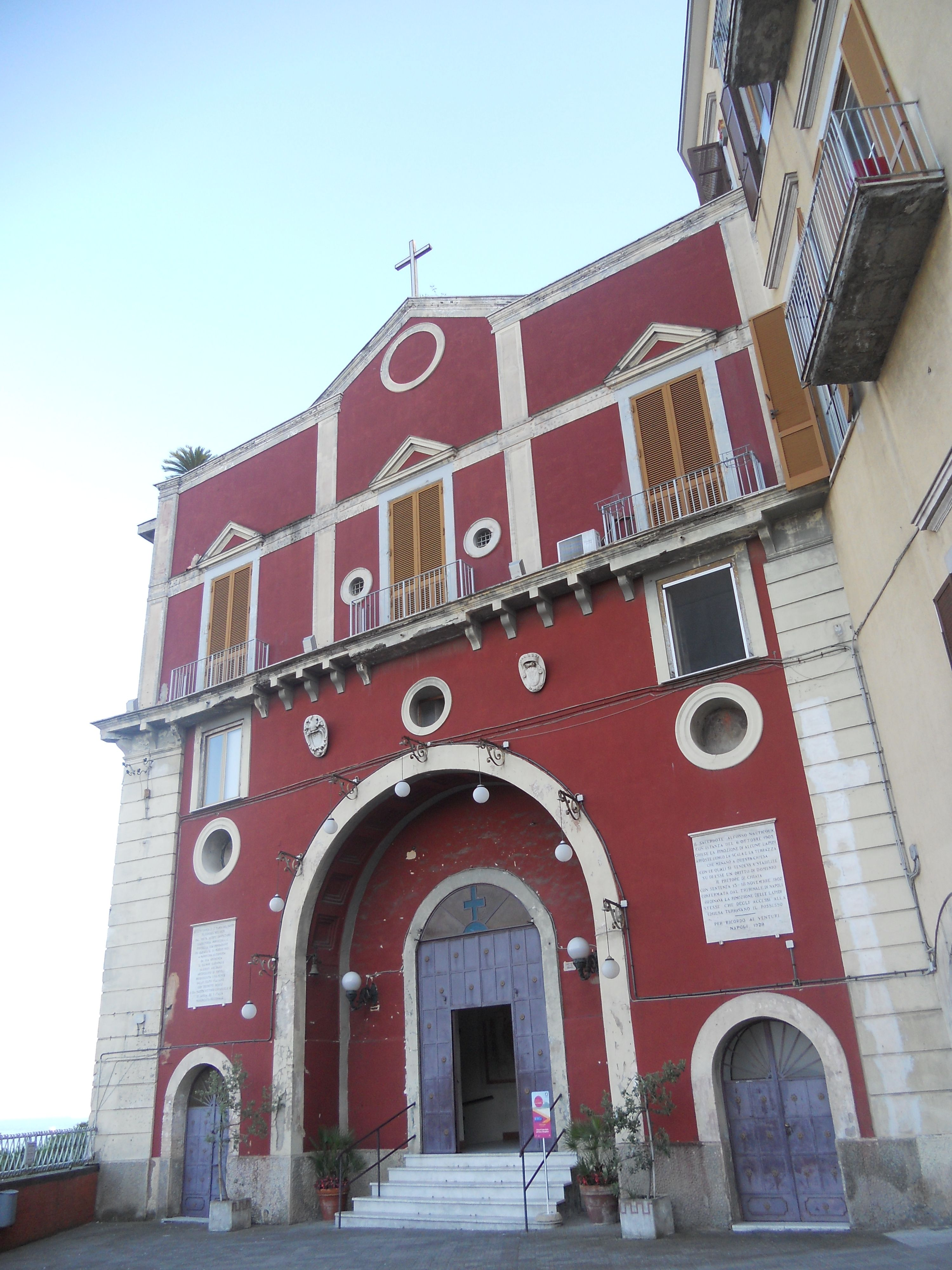
- The façade of Santa Maria del Parto a Mergellina.
- Church of Holy Mary of Childbirth in Mergellina
- 40.824912°N 14.220245°E
- Location: Chiaia; Naples; Province of Naples, Campania
- Country: Italy
- Denomination: Roman Catholic

History
- Status: Active

Architecture
- Architectural type: Church
- Style: Baroque architecture
- Groundbreaking: 1504
- Completed: 1529

Administration
- Diocese: Roman Catholic Archdiocese of Naples

Santa Maria del Parto a Mergellina (Holy Mary of Childbirth in Mergellina) is a church located in the quartiere of Chiaia in Naples, Italy. The church is peculiarly perched on top of a private building and accessed by a stairway, placed behind a restaurant located in piazza Mergellina.

== History ==
The church was founded by the poet Jacopo Sannazaro on land donated to him by King Frederick I of Aragon in 1497. In 1526, Sannazaro authored a poem in Latin hexameter titled De partus Virginis (Childbirth of the Virgin) that helped give the church its name. The church was completed shortly before the poet died in 1530, it was donated to the monks of Santa Maria dei Servi. Sannazzaro's tomb sits behind the altar. The lower church was originally dedicated to the Vergine del Parto (Virgin of Childbirth) and later converted into a crypt. The funeral chapel was originally dedicated to San Nazario and subsequently transformed into the church of "Santa Maria del Parto". In 1886, the church was declared a national monument and became the property of the State.

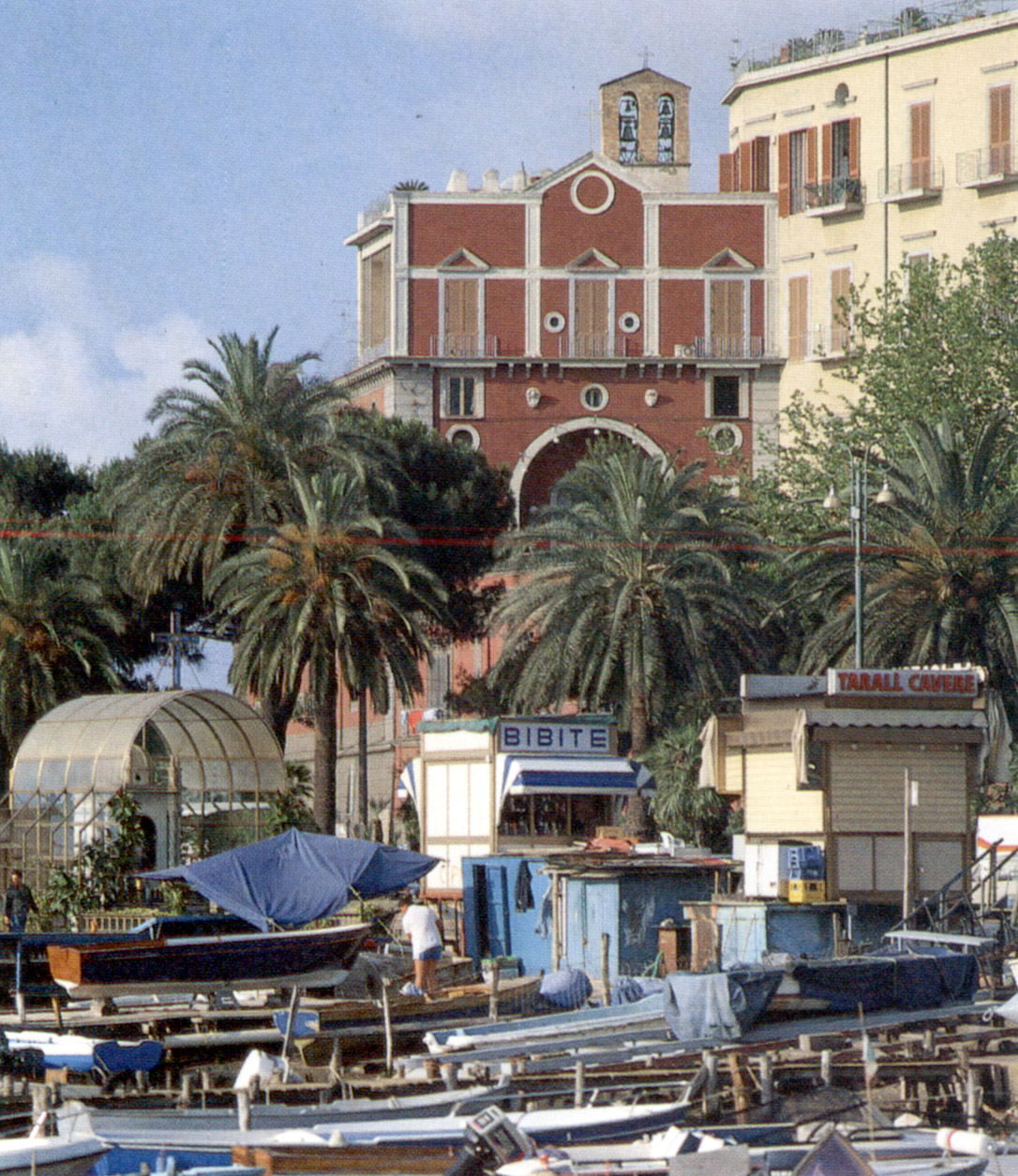
The church, from the bay

== Art and architecture ==
The principal work in the church is the semi-pagan tomb of the poet, represented on the pedestal under the name of Actius Sincerus and being crowned by Fame in a fresco by Niccolò Rossi, a follower of Giordano. The statue, with its complex pagan iconography (1537), is set in the choir behind the altar and was built by the sculptors Bartolomeo Ammannati, Giovanni Angelo Montorsoli and Francesco Ferrucci, although initiated by Girolamo Santacroce Marble was purchased in 1537. The niche is inspired by the environment of Arcadia, also has depictions of Neptune with his trident, Pan and the nymph Syrinx, all in dancing and singing the praises of our poet, and a satyr which gazes in amazement. The arrangement is considered by some confused in composition and with exaggerated movements of the figures.

Statues of Apollo and Minerva flank the tomb, however, given their location in a church, their plinths are labeled David and Judith. An epitaph by the Venetian cardinal Pietro Bembo, secretary to Pope Leo X, at the tomb base, reads: From flower to sacred ashes, here lies the famous and sincere Sannazaro, near to Virgil in poetry as in sepulchre. Virgil's tomb is found nearby in Naples.

The chapel contains paintings with arcadian and mythologic iconography. It also contains frescoes of the Meeting of Abraham and three angels; on the ceiling are painted 'Astronomy, Philosophy, Grammar, and Rhetoric (1699). In the entry arch, Putti spread flowers in a fresco by Giovan Bernardo Lama. The pavement (1561) was made by Fabrizio Manlio di Barletta

In the chapel near the presbytery, the oil painting of the Epiphany is attributed to Jan van Eyck; this painting, Vasari claimed, was the first oil canvas in Italy. Other significant works of the building are the two statues sculpted by brothers heirs of Jacopo and Sannazaro the youth figure with a book in hand, the worm-eaten (but restored) residues of the Nativity scene by Giovanni da Nola.

In the first chapel on the right of the altar is the image of St Michael Archangel spearing the throat of a serpentine Lucifer, commonly known as the Devil of Mergellina, traditionally believed to depict an infamous young Neapolitan woman who had tempted Diomede Carafa, then bishop of Ariano. St Michael defeats her in a victory over worldly temptation ("ella morta giace in ogni luogo e viva sta in ogni luogo" which translates to "she is dead everywhere, and is alive everywhere"

It is reported that the Spanish painter Jusepe de Ribera was buried here

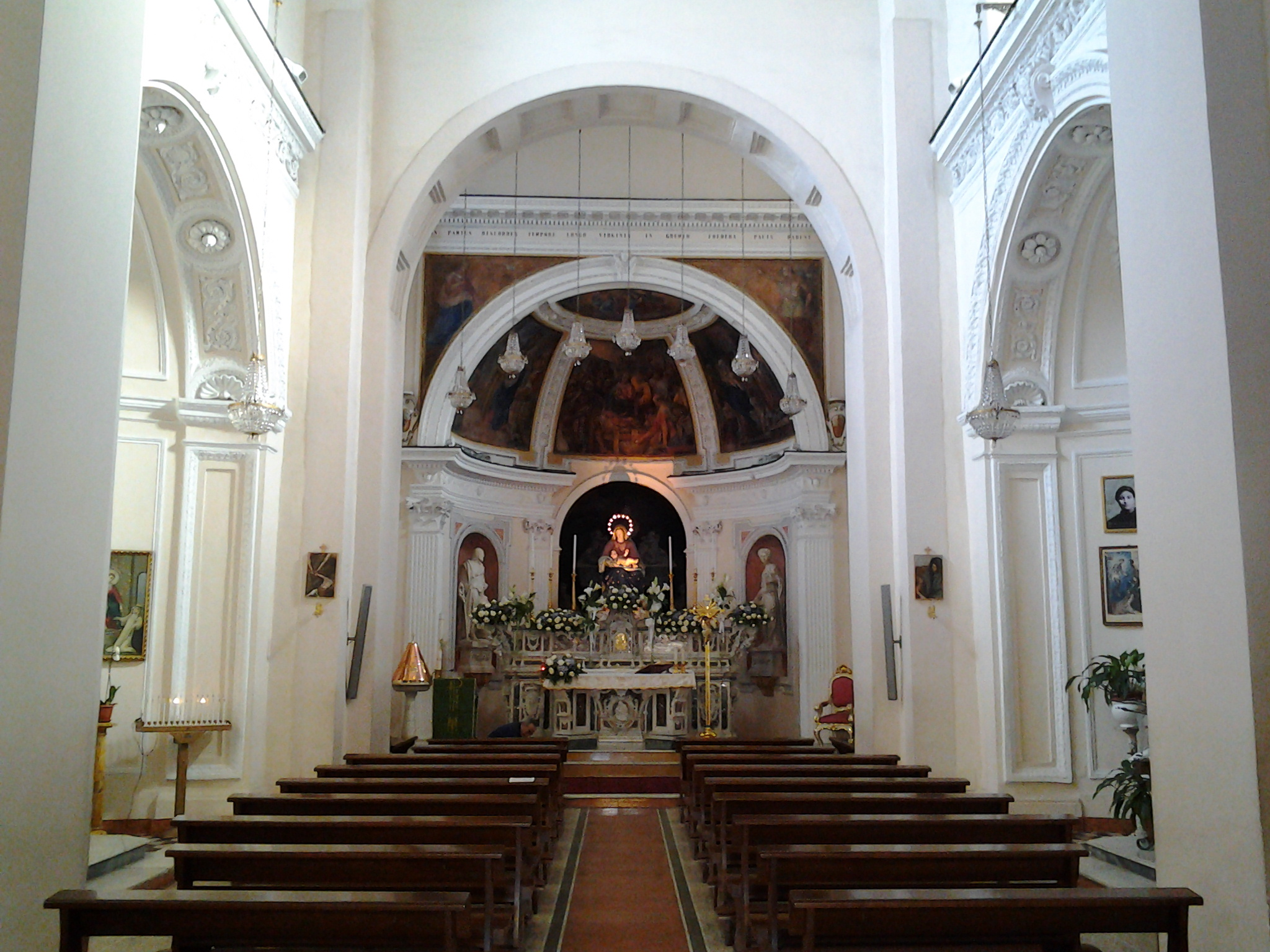
Main altar.

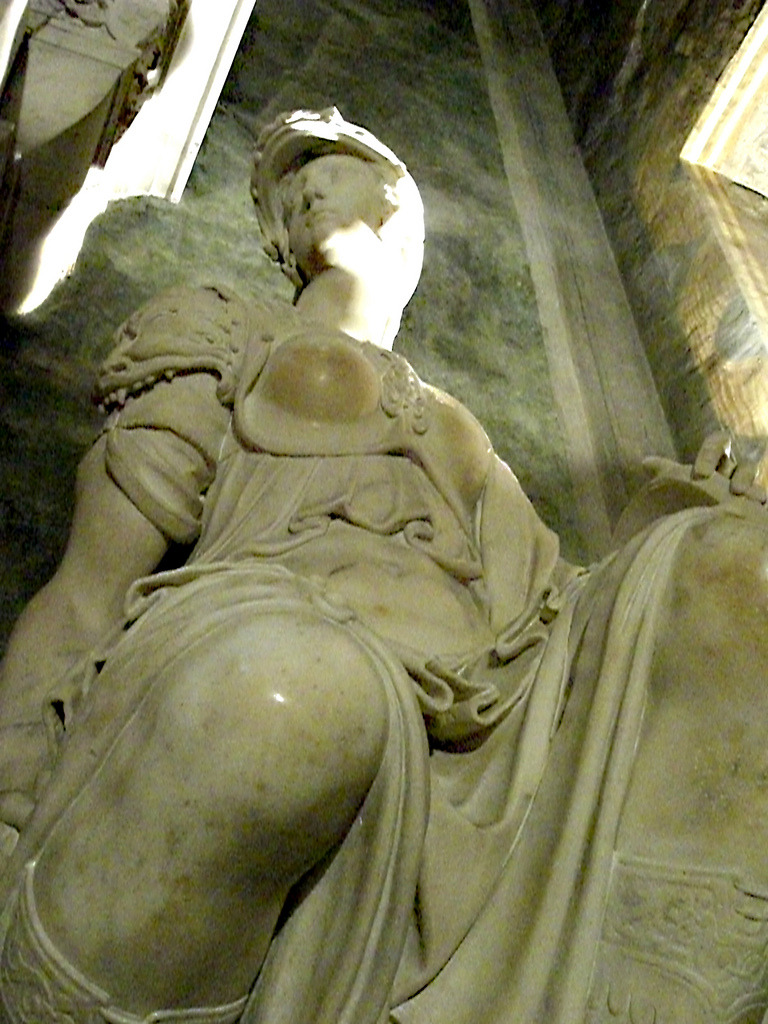
Tomb of Jacopo Sannazaro, detail of Minerva statue, by Ammannati.

== Bibliography ==
- Tanja Michalsky, Erlösung in Arkadien. Sannazaros Grabmal und die Resemantisierung antiker Ausdrucksformen, in: Benvenuto Cellini. Kunst und Kunsttheorie im 16. Jahrhundert, Alessandro Nova / Anna Schreurs (eds.), Köln 2003, p. 239-254.
- Napoli e dintorni, Touring club Italia, Touring Editore, 2001.
- Benedetto Croce, Storie e leggende napoletane, Napoli, Adelphi, 1999.
- Idem, La tomba di Jacobo Sannazzaro and the church di S. Maria del Parto, in "Napoli Nobilissima", I (1892), 5, p. 70.
