= Santa Maria in Portico, Naples =

Church of Santa Maria in Portico
- Chiesa di Santa Maria in Portico
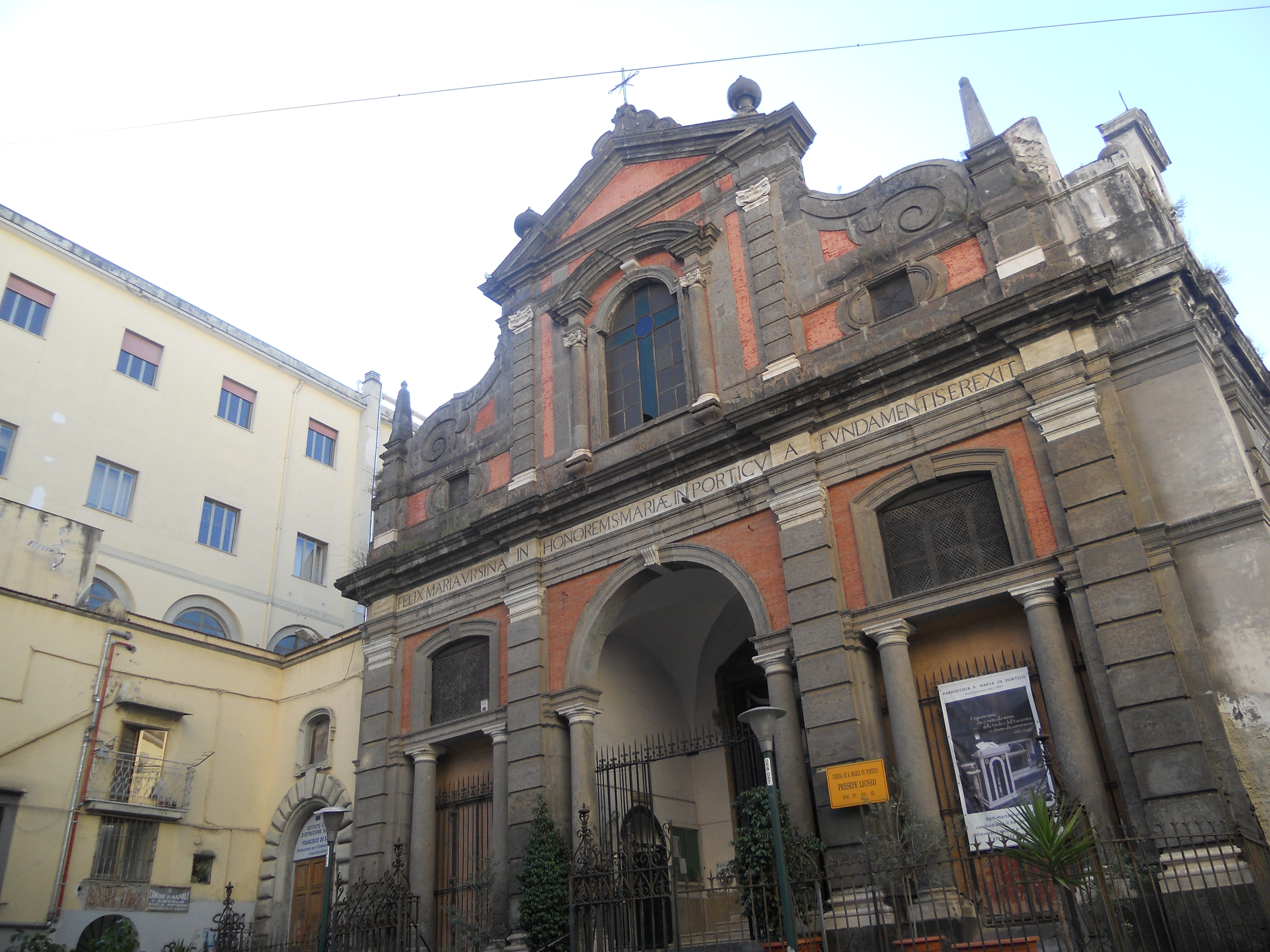
- The façade of Santa Maria in Portico.
- Church of Santa Maria in Portico
- 40.835024°N 14.231212°E
- Location: Via Santa Teresa degli Scalzi; Naples; Province of Naples, Campania
- Country: Italy
- Denomination: Roman Catholic

History
- Status: Active

Architecture
- Architectural type: Church
- Style: Baroque architecture
- Groundbreaking: 1632

Administration
- Diocese: Roman Catholic Archdiocese of Naples

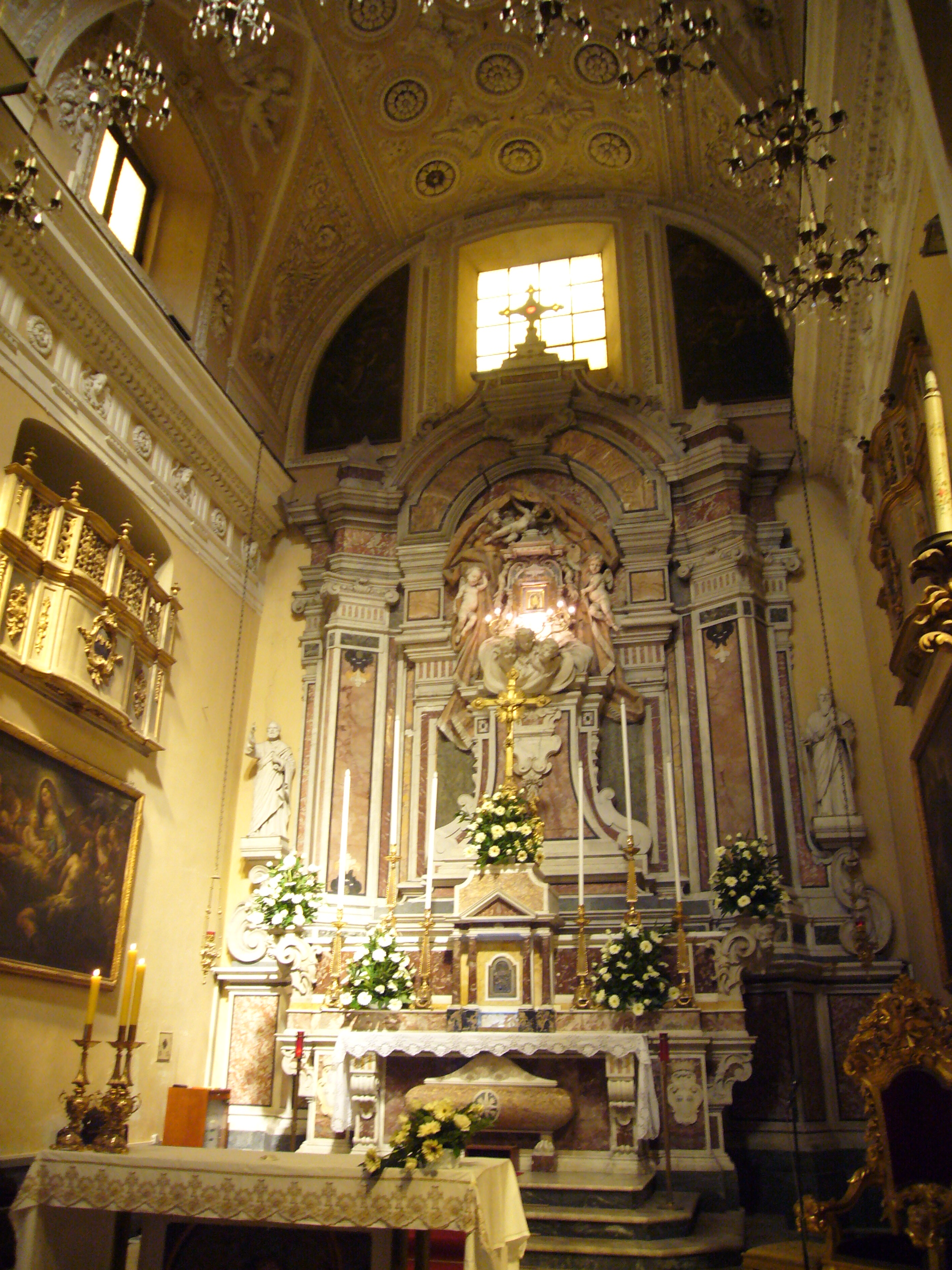
Interior with altar

Chiesa di Santa Maria in Portico is a late-baroque church in the city center of Naples placed at the end of its homonymous street, just off the seaside promenade of the Riviera di Chiaia.

While the original architect was Nicola Longo in 1632; the facade was completed by Arcangelo Guglielmelli in a pell-mell concoction of Mannerist and Baroque styles, utilizing columns and pilasters of varying sizes, volutes, and even obelisks with typical Neapolitan appeal to color differences.

Among the wealth of interior artwork are frescoes by Giovanni Battista Benaschi and interior architectural sculpture by Domenico Antonio Vaccaro. In addition, there is an Annunciation by Fabrizio Santafede and an Assumption by Paolo de Matteis.
