= Mergellina =

Coastal district of Naples, Italy

Coordinates: 40°49′42″N 14°13′14″E

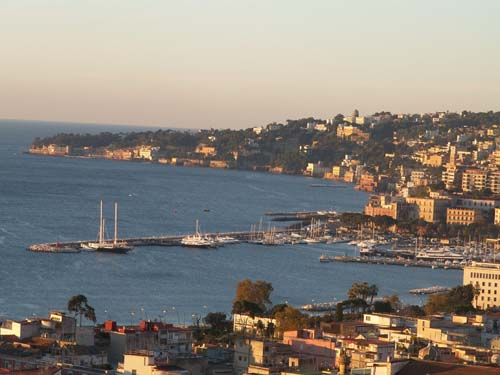
Coastal view of Mergellina

Mergellina (Neapolitan: Margellina) is a coastal district of the city of Naples, Italy. It is located in the quartiere of Chiaia. It stands at the foot of the Posillipo Hill and faces the Castel dell'Ovo. The name derives from mergoglino, a local name for the smew, others believe it is a corruption of Mare Giallo ("Yellow Sea"), which would refers to when the sea turned yellow due to floating tufa rock dust following an eruption of the Vesuvius. However, very likely the real origin of the name is from Latin mare ialinum, which stands for "clear, transparent sea".

== Overview ==
Historically, it was a small fishing village and port, and was quite distinct from Naples itself. The expansion of Naples to the west under the Spaniards in the 17th century and subsequent development under the Bourbons and then by the national Italian government between 1880 and 1915 gradually led to the incorporation of Mergellina into greater metropolitan Naples. Today it is still a fishing port but also a secondary tourist harbor for hydrofoil traffic to the islands in the bay of Naples and to various tourist destinations along the Campanian coast. The port also serves as a mooring for private pleasure craft.

Mergellina was home to the poet Jacopo Sannazaro. The main square, one block from the harbor, faces the church of Santa Maria del Parto with his elaborate tomb.

During the 1960 Summer Olympics, it was used as Olympic Harbor for the Finn (at Sea Garden) and Flying Dutchman sailboats (at Posillipo).

== In popular culture ==
Mergellina is a local cultural landmark in Naples. It is known for great energy, people watching, and food. It is home to the first 50 Kalo, one of the world's most famous pizzeria amongst many other hotspots.

Lungomare Mergellina is home to a port, Molo Luise, frequented by locals in the evenings for stunning sunsets.

== Sources ==
- The Organizing Committee of the Games of the XVII Olympiad (1960). The Games of the XVII Olympiad Rome 1960, The Official Report of the Organizing Committee Volume One (pdf).
- The Organizing Committee of the Games of the XVII Olympiad (1960). The Games of the XVII Olympiad Rome 1960, The Official Report of the Organizing Committee Volume Two (a) (pdf).
- The Organizing Committee of the Games of the XVII Olympiad (1960). The Games of the XVII Olympiad Rome 1960, The Official Report of the Organizing Committee Volume Two (b) (pdf).
