= Università station =

Metro station in Naples

Coordinates: 40.8436°N 14.2554°E

Università
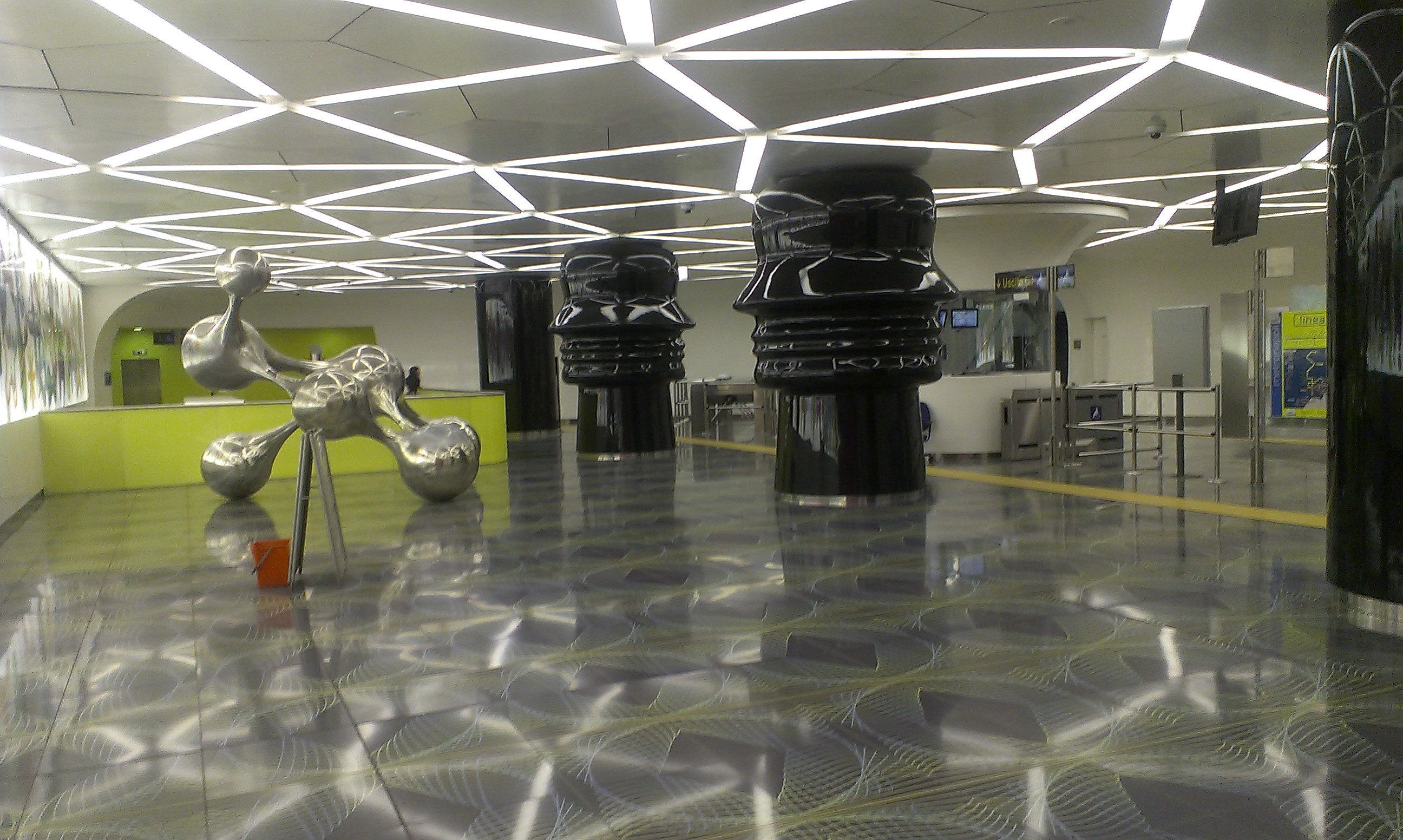
- Mezzanine of the station, entrance to the turnstiles.

General information
- System: Naples Metro station
- Operator: ANM
- Line: Line 1

History
- Opened: 26 March 2011

Services
Preceding station	Naples Metro	Following station
Municipio towards Piscinola Scampia	Line 1	Duomo towards Centro Direzionale
Route map
Location

Università (from Italian: University) is a Naples Metro station on Line 1 located in the Porto district and part of the art stations.

== History ==
The station was opened on 28 March 2011 and was designed by architect Alessandro Mendini and designer Karim Rashid. At the time, it was a one-station extension from Dante, since Toledo and Municipio stations were not yet ready. On 31 December 2013 the line was extended to Garibaldi.

== Structures and systems ==
Given its proximity to the port area, it allows access to the areas of via Depretis and via Colombo, via Marina and Corso Umberto I (known as Rettifilo), one of the most commercial streets in Naples. From the station it is also possible to reach the various university faculties present in the surroundings, those of law, political science and literature and philosophy of the Federico II University and the historical centers of the Oriental University. In 2011 he won the "Emirates Leaf International Award" in London.

The station is located at a depth of 30 m below street level, a considerable depth, but of little consequence compared to the "visceral" depth of the Salvator Rosa station. It is accessed via two stairs, one placed in front of the Palazzo della Borsa, seat of the Naples Chamber of Commerce, the other on the opposite sidewalk, on the sea side, where there is also the elevator shaft. Their peculiarity lies in being covered with tiles on which the words that have been invented in recent times are written. The station inside is characterized by very suggestive colors and panels that capture the attention of commuters.

In particular, the two basic colors are fuchsia and acid green which are each specific to one of the two platforms. Starting from the plane of the obliterators where the particular sculptures designed by Rashid are present, the most suggestive of these is called Synapsi and wants to remember the neural network of the brain, anticipating the effects that the underlying environments generate. The two black columns modeled as a continuous human profile, called conversational profile, also stand out. The subject depicted is Rashid himself. Along the quays, the panels that cover the walls present three-dimensional stereoscopic effects. Other luminous optical games can also be found in various points of the intermediate mezzanines. Finally, the vividly colored depictions of Dante and Beatrice on the access steps to the quays are worthy of note.

== Services ==
The station has:

- Automatic ticket office

== Interchanges ==
- Bus stop
- Trolley bus stop
