= Line 1 (Naples Metro) =

Rapid transit line in Naples, Italy

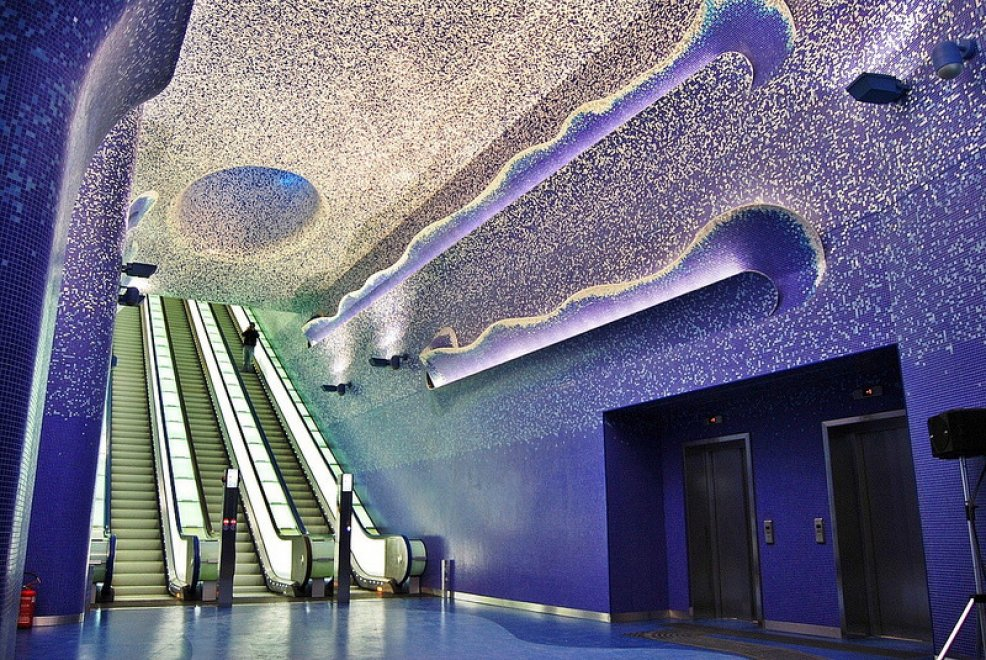
- The Toledo station's escalators to the exit and its famous artwork.

Overview
- Line number: 1
- Locale: Naples, Campania, Italy
- Termini: Piscinola Scampia; Centro Direzionale
- Connecting lines: Lines 2, 6 and 11, Circumvesuviana
- Stations: 20 (planned total of 27)
- Color on map: Yellow (#F3BC62)
- Website: anm.it

Service
- Type: Rapid transit
- System: Naples Metro
- Operator: ANM
- Depot: Piscinola Depot
- Rolling stock: CAF Inneo Mohini
- Daily ridership: 100,000 (2023)
- Ridership: 35.100 million (2023) passenger journeys

History
- Opened: 28 March 1993; 33 years ago
- Last extension: 2025

Technical
- Line length: 20.7 km (12.9 mi)
- Character: Deep level
- Track gauge: 1,435 mm (4 ft 8 1/2 in) standard gauge
- Electrification: 1,500 V DC overhead catenary
- Operating speed: 90 km/h (56 mph)
Route map

Line 1 (Italian: Linea 1; Italian pronunciation: [ˈliːnea ˈuːno]) is the oldest and one of the busiest lines of Naples Metro's mass transit rail network. The line that runs from Piscinola Scampia in suburban north-west Naples to Centro Direzionale in southeast Naples. Printed in yellow on the map, it serves 20 stations, 17 of which are underground, over 20.7 kilometres (12.9 mi). It is operated by ANM. The line has been renamed Metrò dell'Arte (Metro of Art) reflecting the presence of contemporary art works installed in some of its stations.

The line is in the process of being upgraded and expanded. When the upgrading works are completed, Line 1 will connect 27 stations and form a loop, and bring easier access to the city centre for residents of Chiaiano, Piscinola, and Scampia.

The operational route has a declared average frequency of one service every 7 minutes (from 6 AM to 9 PM), occasionally enhanced during peak weekday hours to every 6 minutes, while during other time slots (from 9 PM to end of service) it operates every 11 minutes.

The line spans 20.7 kilometres (12.9 mi) with 20 stations, covering a travel time of almost 40 minutes. Due to the complex terrain of Naples, the line features significant gradients. The route itself is intricate: there is a section where the metro negotiates a very tight and steep curve, and another where it passes through the same point as before but at a greater depth. Much of the journey is underground, except for the Colli Aminei-Piscinola-Scampia section, which runs on viaducts with elevated stations. Known as the "hillside metro" (metro collinare), Line 1 serves various hilly areas of the city, including Vomero, Colli Aminei, and the hospital district (Zona ospedaliera)

As of June 2026, construction is underway for the segments from Centro Direzionale to Capodichino and from Piscinola Scampia to Di Vittorio, completing the loop.

It intersects with Line 2 at Museo - Piazza Cavour and Garibaldi stations, with Metro Line 6 at Municipio Porto station and with Metro Line 11 at Piscinola Scampia station.

In 2009, its art-themed stations earned Line 1 the Most Innovative Approach to Station Development Award in London, triumphing over three hundred competitors.

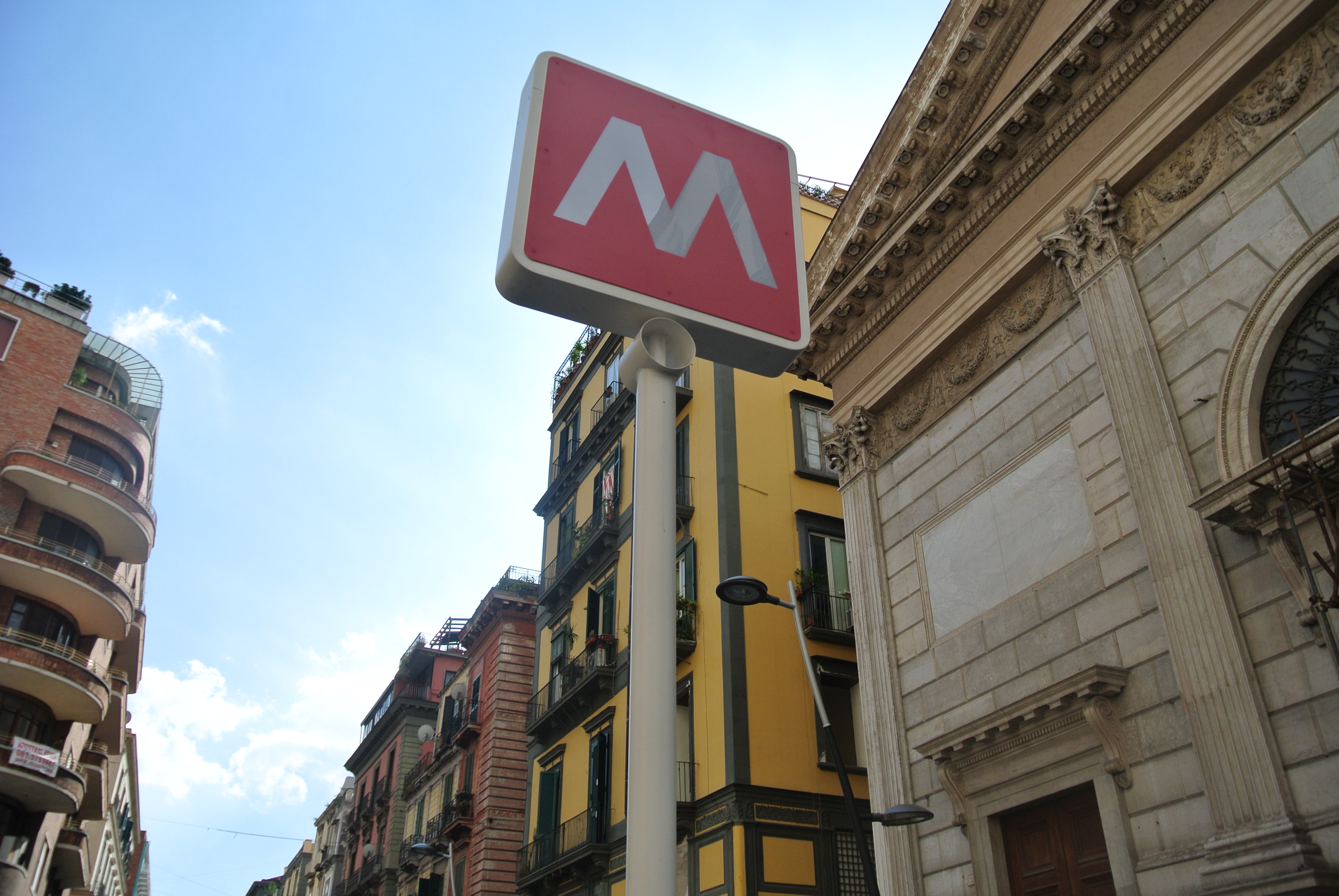
Naples Metro sign

== History ==
Planning for Line 1 began in 1963, when the Ente Autonomo del Volturno (EAV) proposed a new funicular line to connect Vomero with the Museum. However the Commissione Comunale dei Trasporti (Municipal Transportation Commission) decided to investigate alternative possibilities to a funicular line. After several years of discussions, in 1966, the EAV proposed the construction of a metro system connecting Piazza Matteotti with Piazza Medaglie d'Oro, with provision for further extension to the Hospital in Colli Aminei.

The following year the council approved the EAV's "white paper" for the project. By 1968, a commission had been undertaken to plan and study possible routes and station locations, and they determined that the subway would be about 4.5 km long and have 12 stations, with an average distance between stations of 375m. On the day the project was due to be approved by the council, the EAV attempted to submit an updated version of the draft asking for concessions for construction and operation but was refused, and the project immediately stalled.

A further year and a half passed with no progress made. By 1971, the Azienda Trasporti Milanesi (Transport Agency of Milan) had become involved, assisting Azienda Napoletana Mobilità (Transportation Agency of Naples) in trying to formulate an alternative draft plan. Submissions made in both 1970 and 1971 for further funding towards construction were both refused. A breakthrough was achieved in 1972, with a funding of 42 million lire approved, on the proviso that the line be extended to connect Naples central railway station.

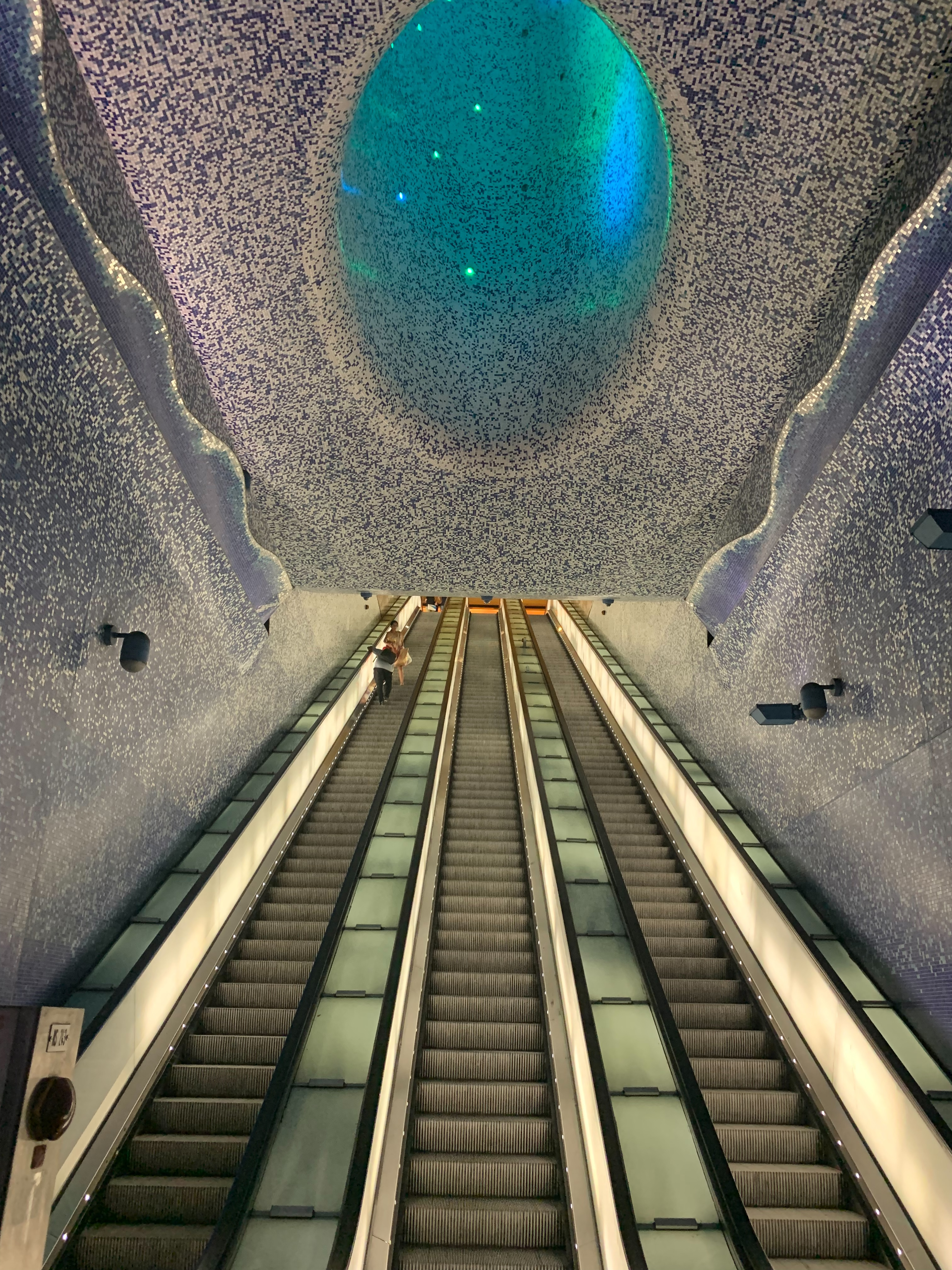
Toledo station.

As a result of the breakthrough, in 1972, Metropolitana di Napoli was formed with 1,2 million lire of operating capital and a new revised proposal for the project was submitted. However, despite the earlier promises that were made, the Italian government decided to block the funds. By 1974, it was decided that the responsibility for funding the project should fall on the regional government, not the Italian government. A new budget of 10 million lire was made available. On Christmas Eve 1974, the new proposals were finally given approval. Between 1975 and 1977, the project was again delayed as an Interministerial Commission was conducted as part of governmental scrutiny processes. In 1976 the municipal council finally granted the money to implement the project and the foundation stone for Medaglie d'Oro station was laid on 22 December 1976.

In 1978, it was decided that the line could be extended to Scampia and Piscinola, and the funding was provided by the European Community. By 1980, the line had reached Piazza Vanvitelli, but on 23 November of that year, the Irpinia earthquake struck nearby Conza, causing extensive damage and loss of life. It was then advised that plans would have to be adapted to deal with possible future earthquakes. The European Union funded 33% of the total expenditure for this additions to the plans. However, in the mid 1990s, it emerged that elements of the Camorra had been involved in syphoning millions of lire of this funding.

In 1983, further funding issues continually blocked and delayed construction work, and in 1984, the council was forced to apply for loans for the continuation of construction. The following year, the contract for the construction of the stretch from Colli Aminei to Piscinola proceeded, with funds allocated by the Comune di Napoli council and Campania regional government, and in May 1985, the stretch between Piazza Medaglie d'Oro and Colli Aminei.

Between 1986 and 1988, sections of line from Colli Aminei to Vanvitelli, Piscinola Scampia and Salvator Rosa were completed.

After thirteen years of work, the first section of the line, between the stations of Vanvitelli and Colli Aminei, opened on 23 March 1993.

On 19 July 1995, the line was extended to Piscinola – Scampia.

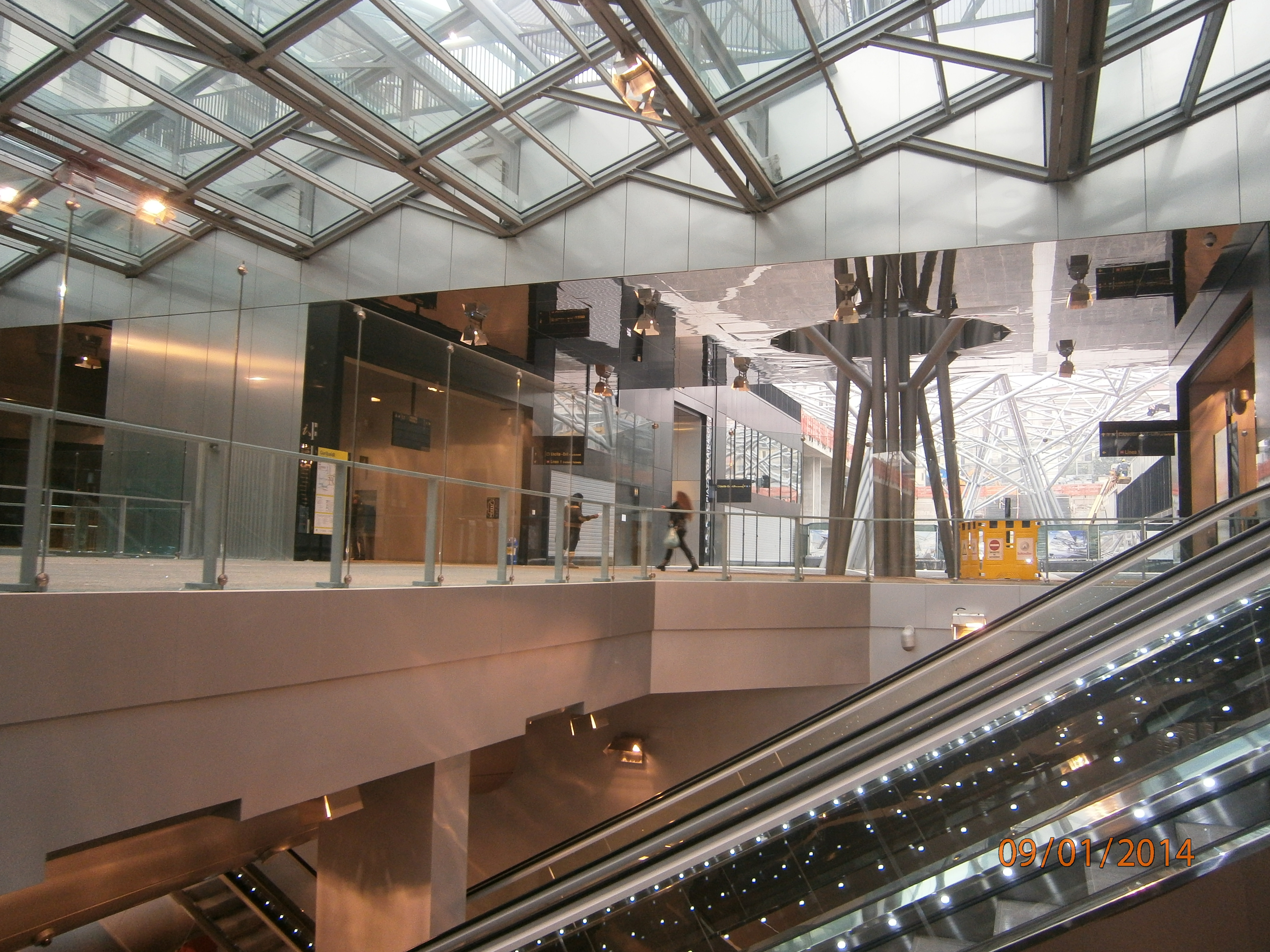
Stazione Garibaldi.

A large length of Line 1 runs along the coast of the Gulf of Naples, and some is parallel to the ancient city wall. Much of the area through which it has been constructed is archaeologically rich, and many objects have been recovered during its construction. Currently these objects are displayed in Museo station, and it is planned for further such exhibits at Duomo and Municipio Porto. The Duomo station is also expected to include the remains of an ancient Roman temple.

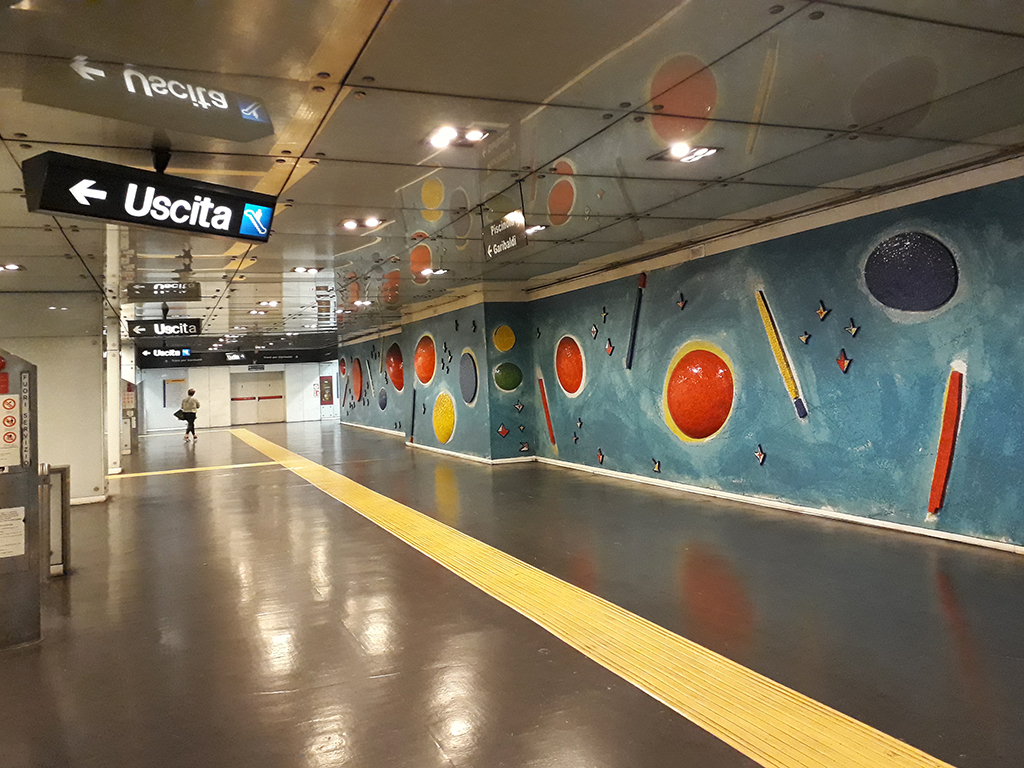
Dante station.

In 2001, the line was extended from Vanvitelli to Museo near the National Archaeological Museum, where it connects with Piazza Cavour on Line 2 by an underground walkway. The line was extended to Dante in the heart of the city in 2002 with an intermediate station at Materdei opening in 2003. In 2011, the line reached Università with an intermediate station at Toledo opening in September 2013 which won the prize as one of the most impressive and most beautiful European stations.

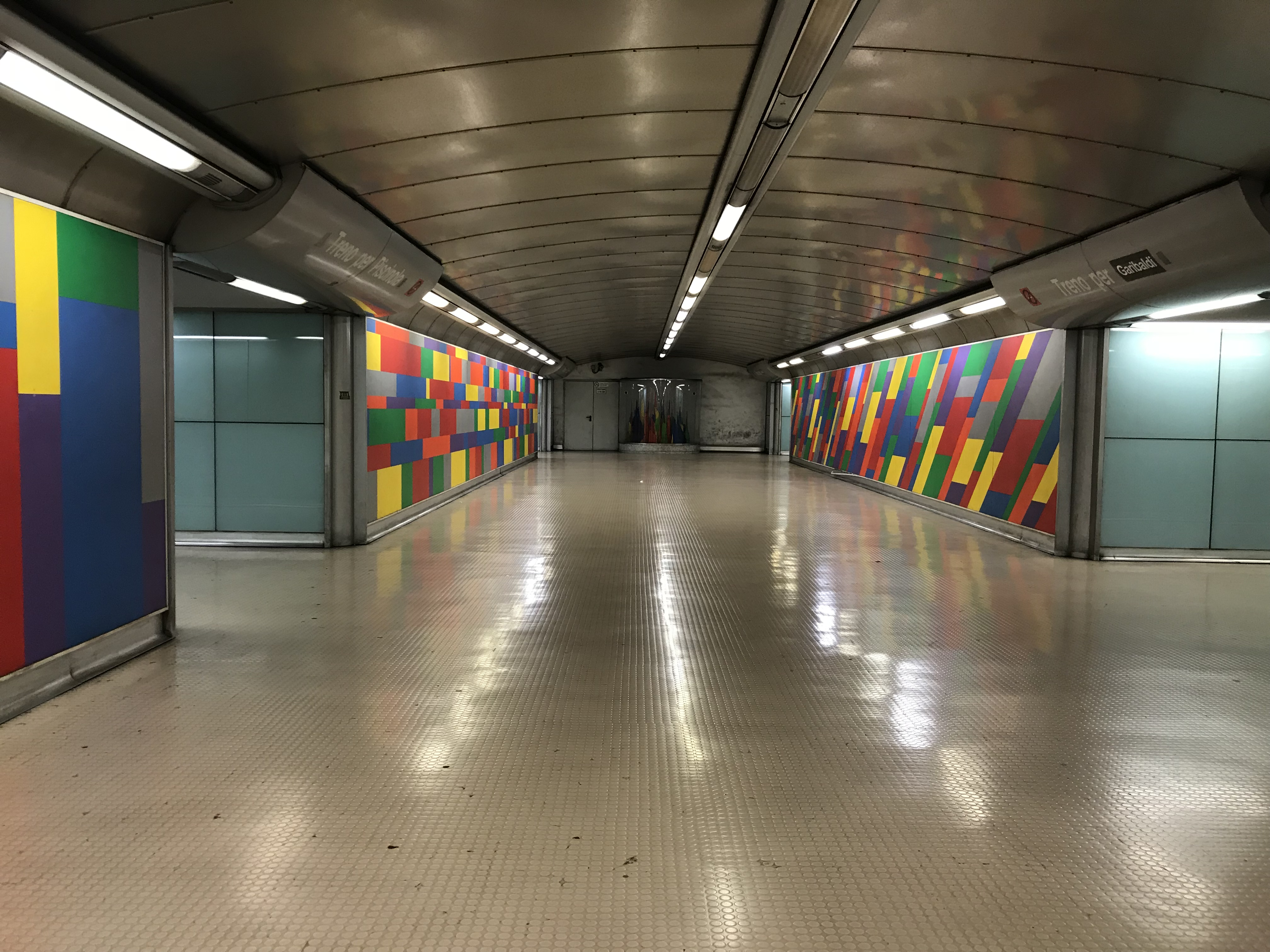
Materdei station.

In 2013, the line finally reached Garibaldi beside the central train station with an intermediate station Municipio opening near the city hall in 2015. In 2021, the intermediate station Duomo was opened.

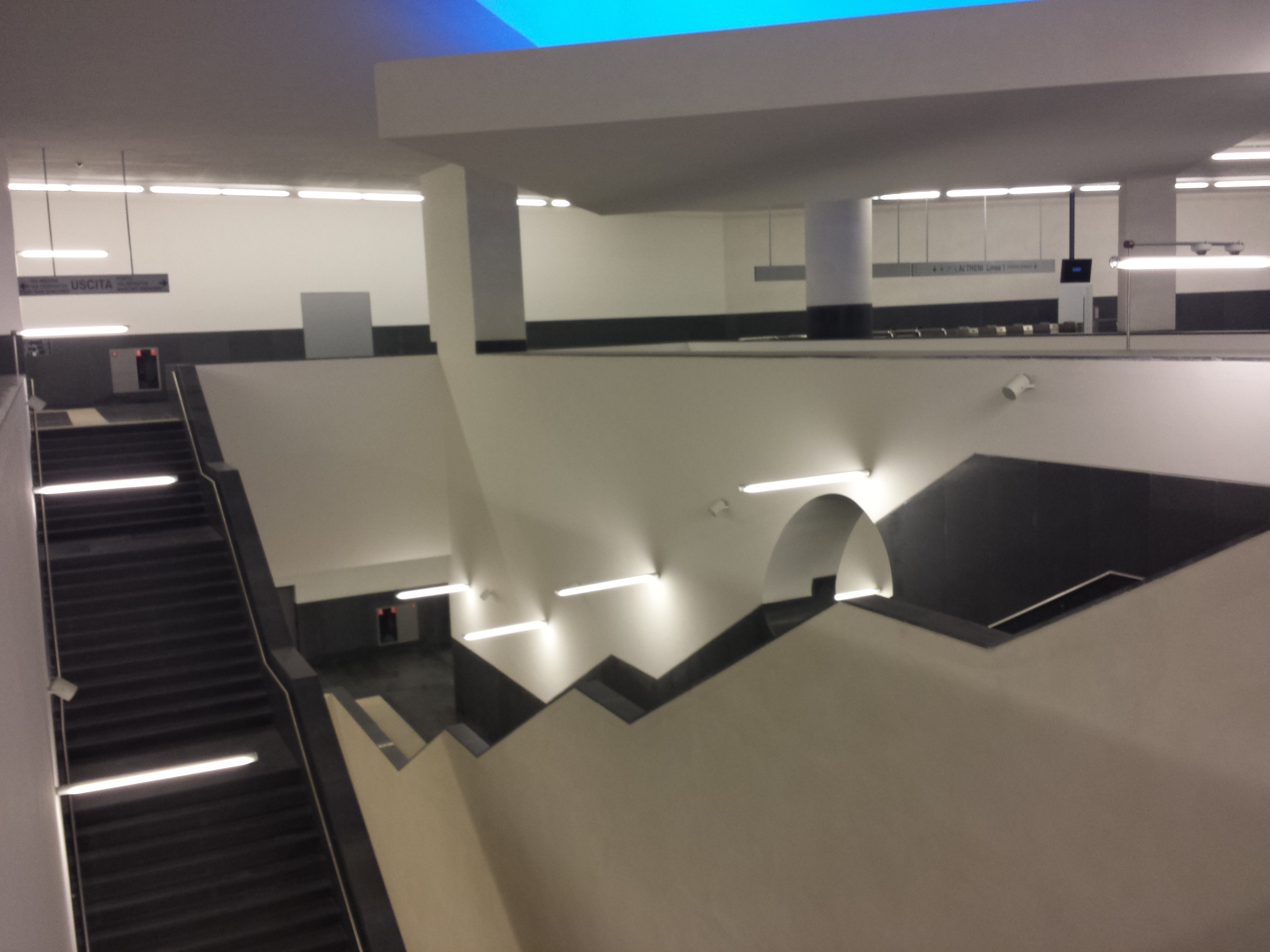
Municipio station.

Line 1 was operated by Metronapoli from July 2000 to 2013. In November 2013, operations of the Naples Metro was taken over by ANM.

== Artistic and archaeological heritage ==
=== Art Stations ===
The Line 1 of the Naples Metro is renowned for its "art stations," featuring a significant artistic heritage. These stations are distinguished by the integration of contemporary artworks and installations created by internationally renowned artists. This initiative transforms each station into a cultural point of interest as well as a transportation hub.

The Garibaldi station on Line 1 of the Naples Metro, designed by the French architect Dominique Perrault, exemplifies modern and functional architecture. Serving the city's railway area and the Duchesca and Vasto districts, the station features a large perforated teflon metal pergola providing shade to the underground square below, where numerous commercial activities are planned. The interior of the station utilizes satin and glossy steel, accented with bright orange details, creating a luminous environment thanks to a transparent glass roof that allows natural light to reach nearly down to the platform level, situated approximately 40 meters deep. Two large artworks by Michelangelo Pistoletto, titled "Stazione," are installed near the escalators, featuring mirrored steel panels with serigraphed photographs of passengers, blending static and reflected images for a dynamic and interactive effect.

The Università station, designed by Karim Rashid and Alessandro Mendini and inaugurated on March 26, 2011, celebrates the digital age and information. Colorful and eclectic, the station employs materials like Corian and mirrored steel, with a strong chromatic contrast between hot pink and lime, guiding passengers visually. Numerous artworks adorn the station, such as the Conversational profile pillars, the Ikon light box, and the Synapsi sculpture, symbolizing communication and human intelligence.

The Municipio station, designed by Álvaro Siza and Eduardo Souto de Moura, is notable for the numerous historical and archaeological findings discovered during excavations. These artifacts, including remnants of the ancient port of Neapolis and the fortifications of the Maschio Angioino, have been integrated into the station structure, transforming it into a museum as well as a transportation hub.

The Toledo station, designed by Óscar Tusquets Blanca and inaugurated on September 17, 2012, is conceived to evoke a journey underwater. Extending to approximately 50 meters deep, the station's design includes features like the "Crater de luz," a large cone that spans all levels, and artistic installations such as Robert Wilson's "Relative light" and "By the sea... you and me," recreating a marine environment.

The Dante station, designed by Gae Aulenti and inaugurated on March 27, 2002, is located beneath the square of the same name and preserves the eighteenth-century layout of the area. The station interior showcases artworks by contemporary artists like Carlo Alfano, Joseph Kosuth, Michelangelo Pistoletto, and Jannis Kounellis, demonstrating how art can seamlessly integrate with architecture and urban design.

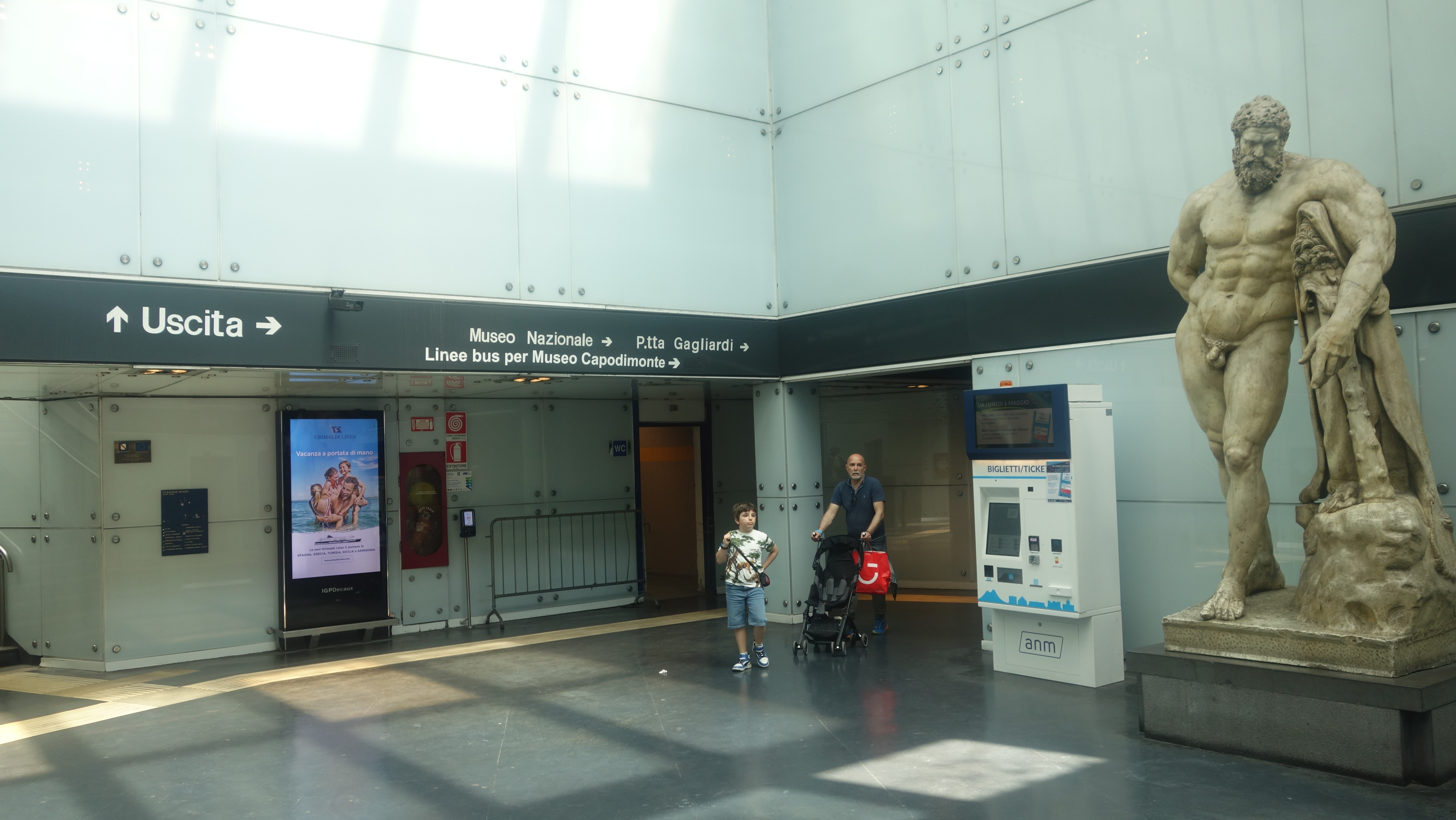
Replica of the Farnese Hercules.

The Museo station, inaugurated in 2001, connects Line 1 with the National Archaeological Museum of Naples through a moving walkway. Also designed by Gae Aulenti, the station features reproductions of important classical artworks and photographs that preview the treasures of the nearby museum.

Finally, the Materdei station, designed by Alessandro Mendini and opened in 2003, features an entrance adorned with mosaics, a large yellow and green star, and contemporary artworks that enrich travelers' experiences with vibrant colors and geometric forms.

=== Archaeological remains and artifacts unearthed ===
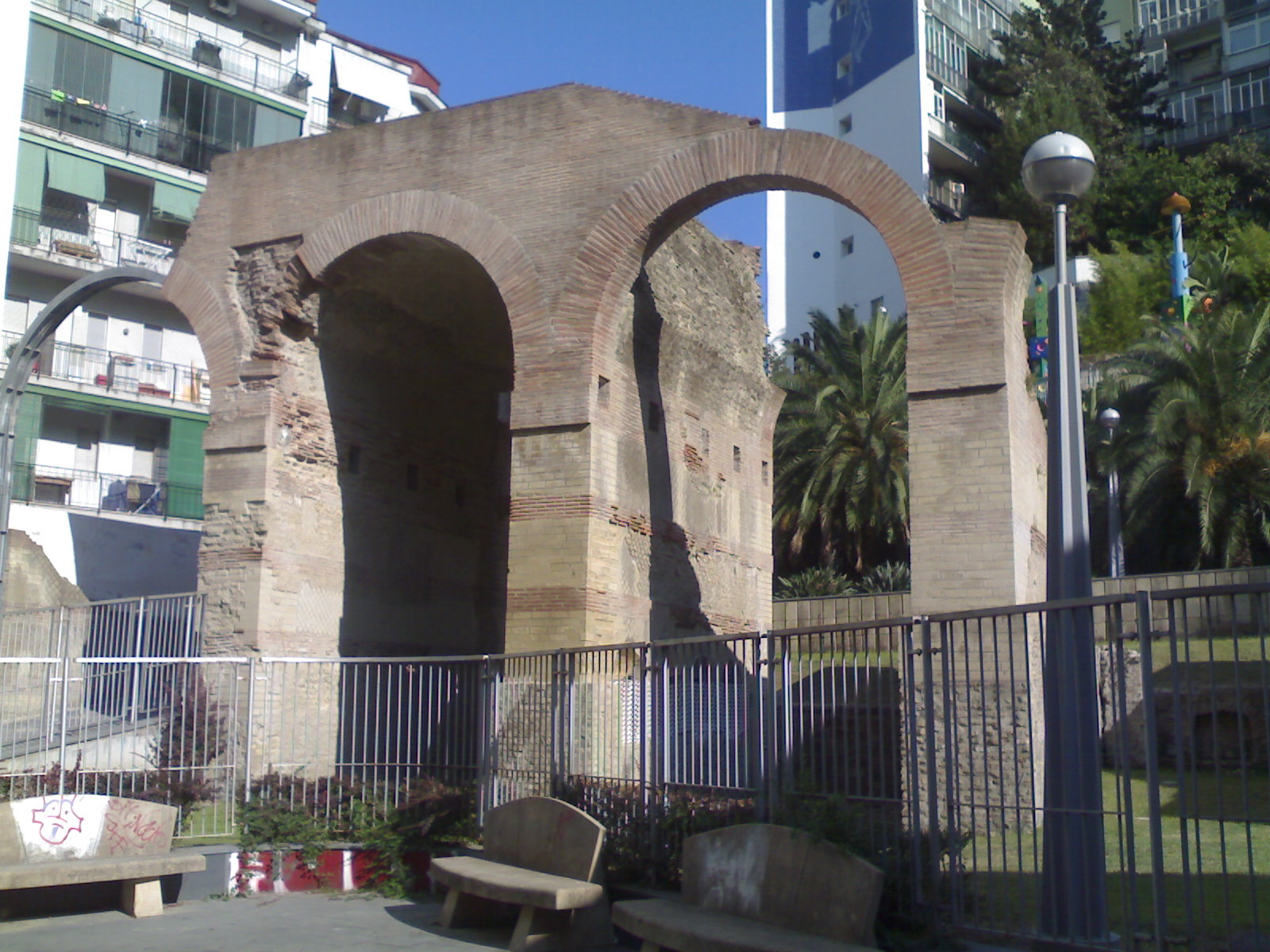
The arches of the Roman bridge on Via Salvator Rosa.

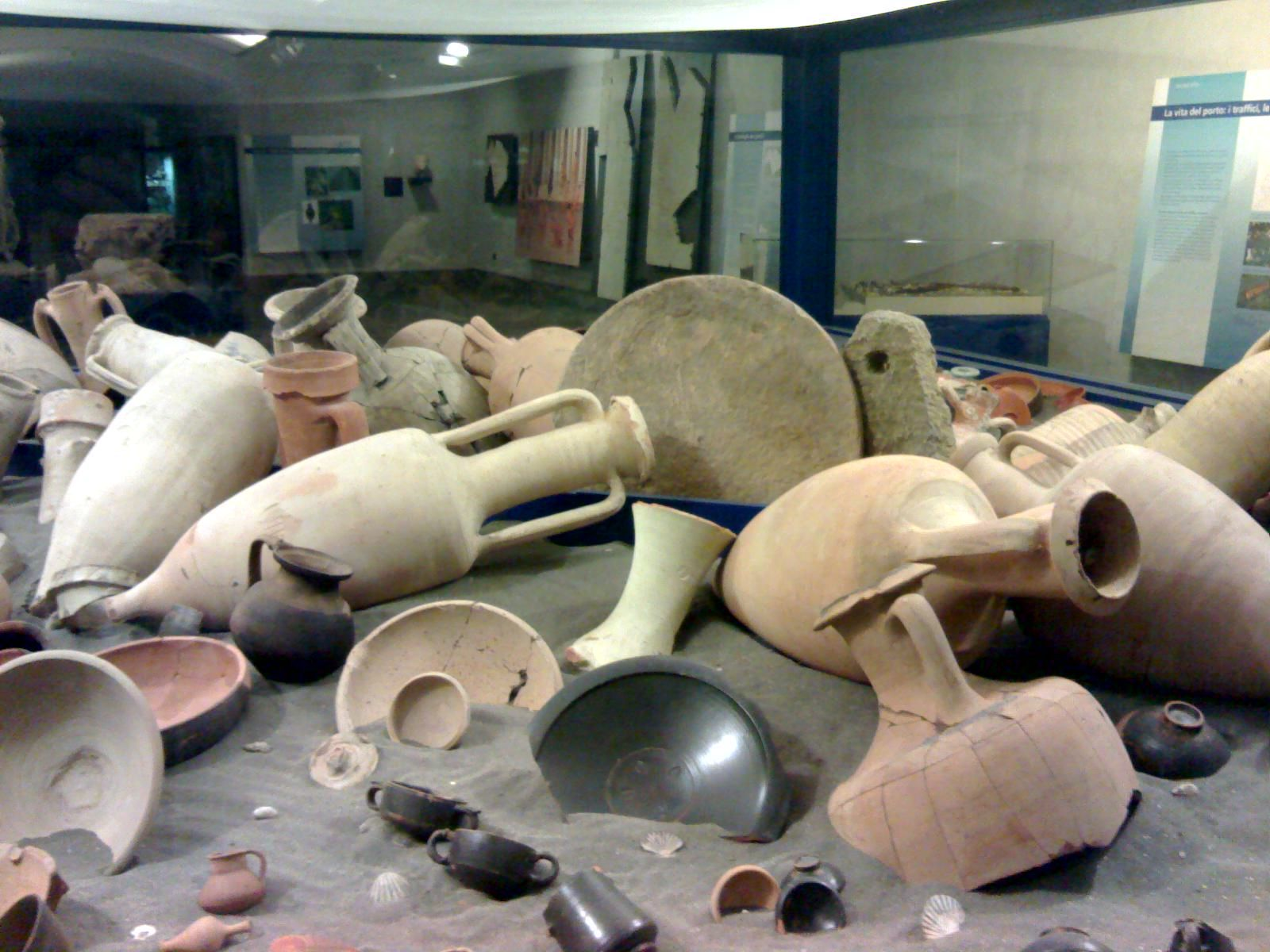
Amphorae discovered during the excavations at Municipio station.

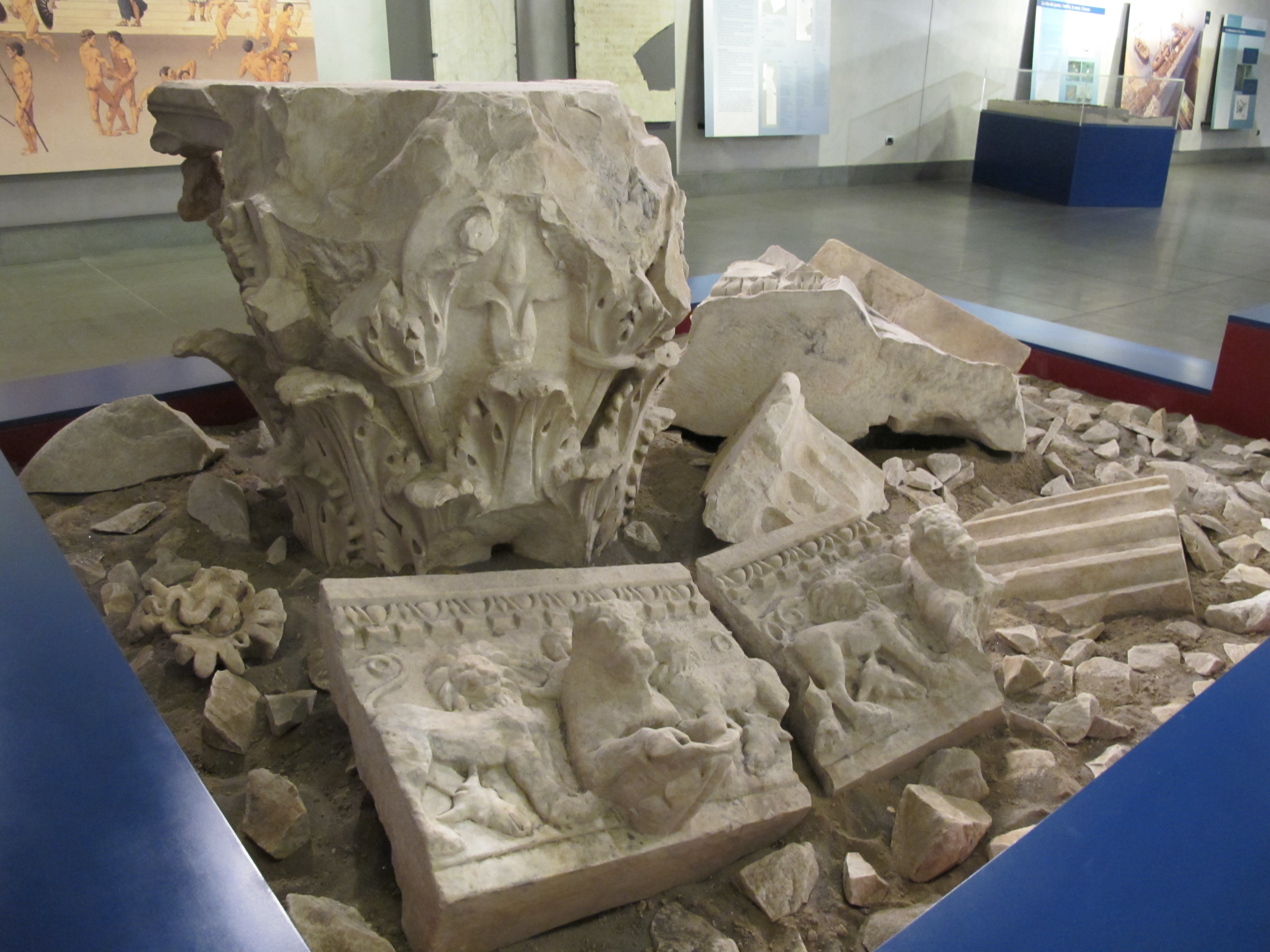
Marble blocks unearthed during the excavations at Università station.

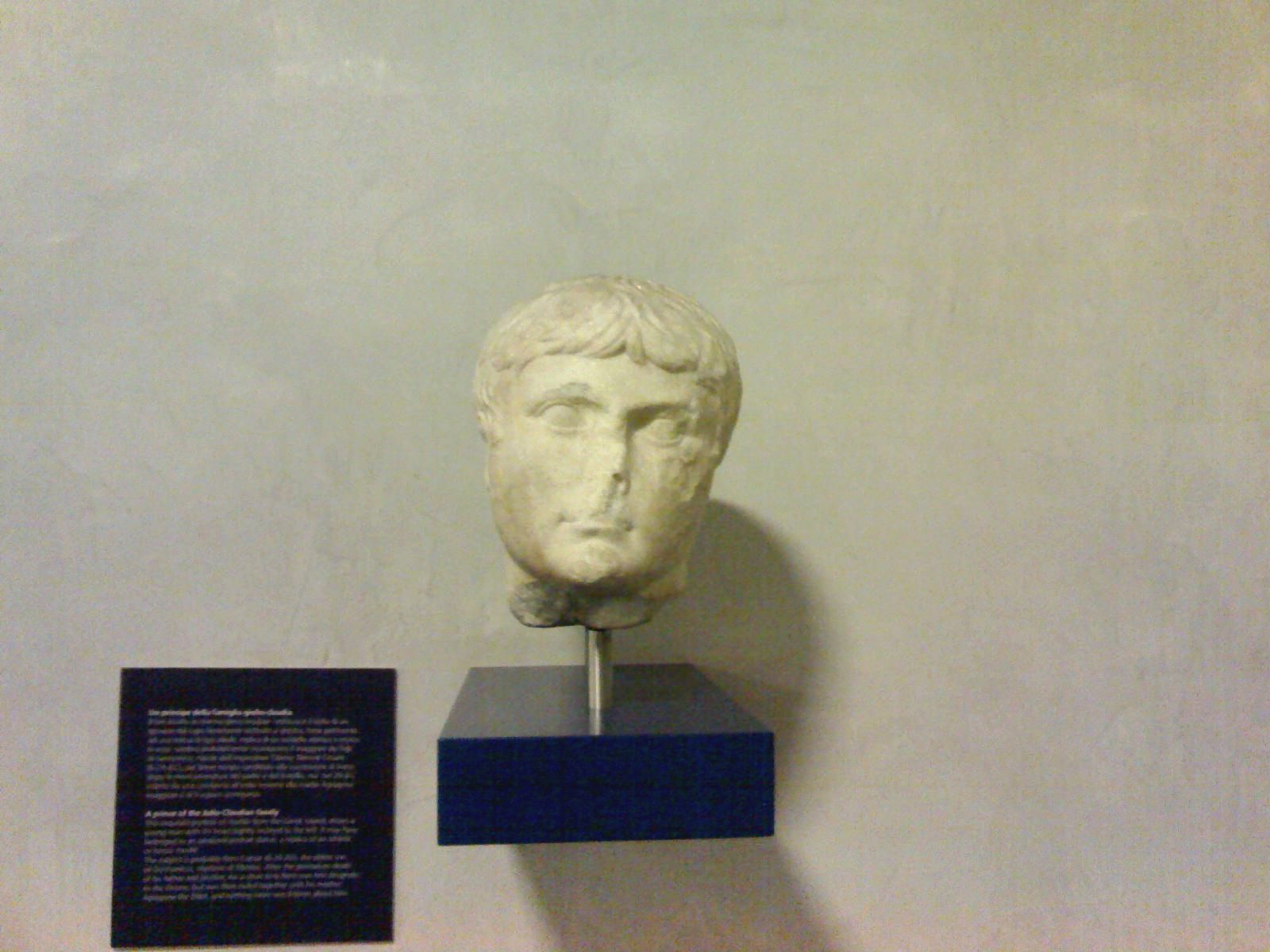
A marble head, likely depicting Nero, son of Germanicus, found at Duomo station.

During the excavation works for the Naples Metro, numerous archaeological finds spanning various historical periods of the city of Naples have been unearthed. These discoveries, ranging from prehistoric times to the Aragonese era, have been displayed in the Neapolis Station, a small museum integrated into the National Archaeological Museum of Naples.

The main excavations focused on the southern stations of the line, particularly at Toledo, Municipio, Università, and Duomo. For instance, at Toledo station, artifacts ranging from the prehistoric to the Byzantine-Aragonese periods were found, including fragments of building fortifications and a paleosol with traces of Neolithic plowing.

At Piazza Municipio, excavations revealed an ancient Roman port with shipwrecks, amphorae, coins, and other artifacts attesting to the importance and activity of the port in ancient Neapolis. The discovery of well-preserved Roman barges underscored Naples' strategic and commercial significance during Roman times.

At Università station, excavation works uncovered remains of a Byzantine fortification and architectural elements from the imperial era, such as a Corinthian capital and marble slabs depicting sacrifice scenes and legionary figures.

Duomo station yielded significant finds, including remains of a public building from the Augustan period and a medieval marble fountain with graffiti. Important elements of the ancient Gymnasium were also discovered, such as columns, mosaic floors, and slabs with inscriptions of winners from the Isolympics.

Finally, at Garibaldi station, discoveries included Roman walls and remnants of pre-Risanamento foundations, providing new insights into the southeastern perimeter of ancient Neapolis.

== Technical features ==
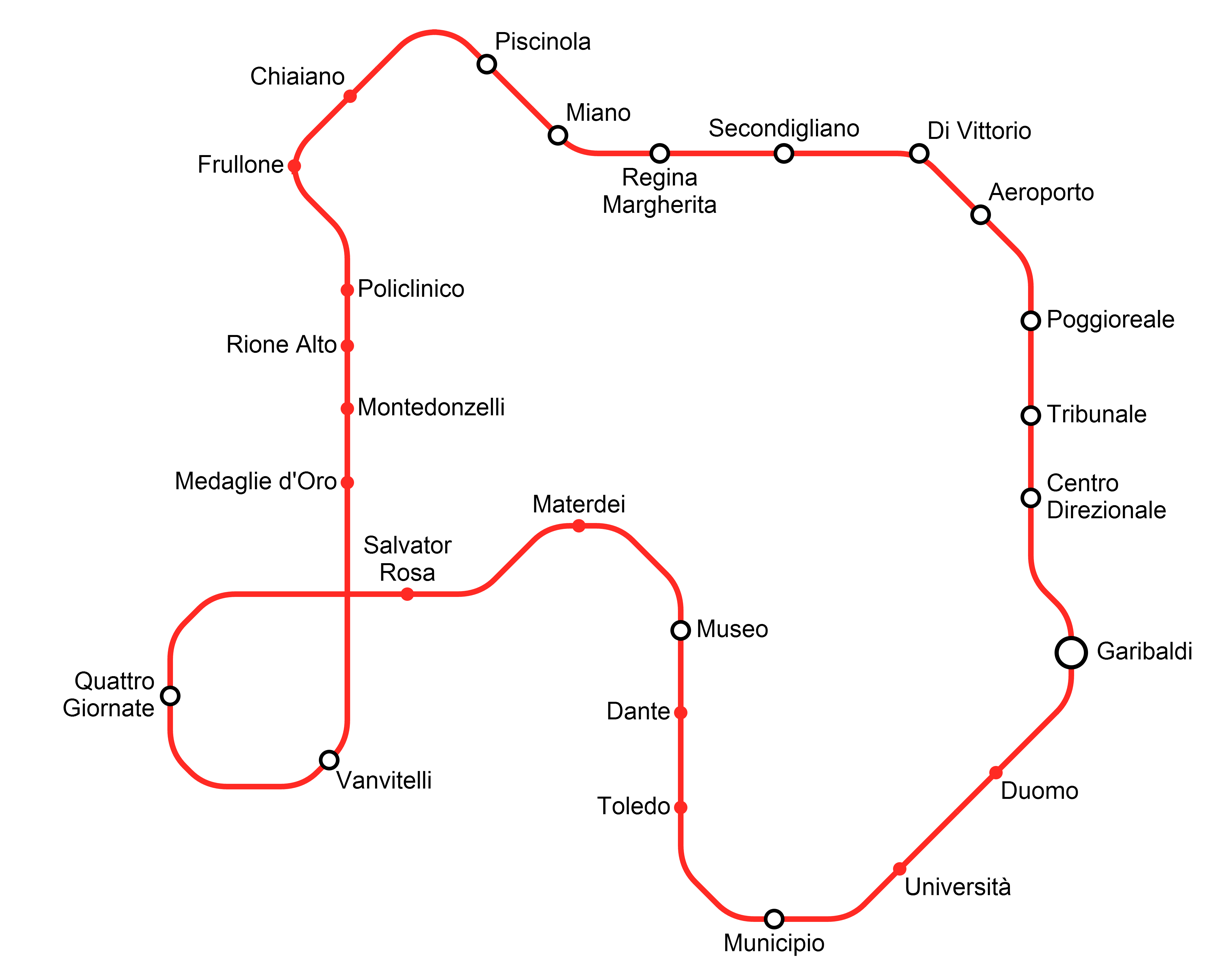
Map of Line 1 upon its completion.

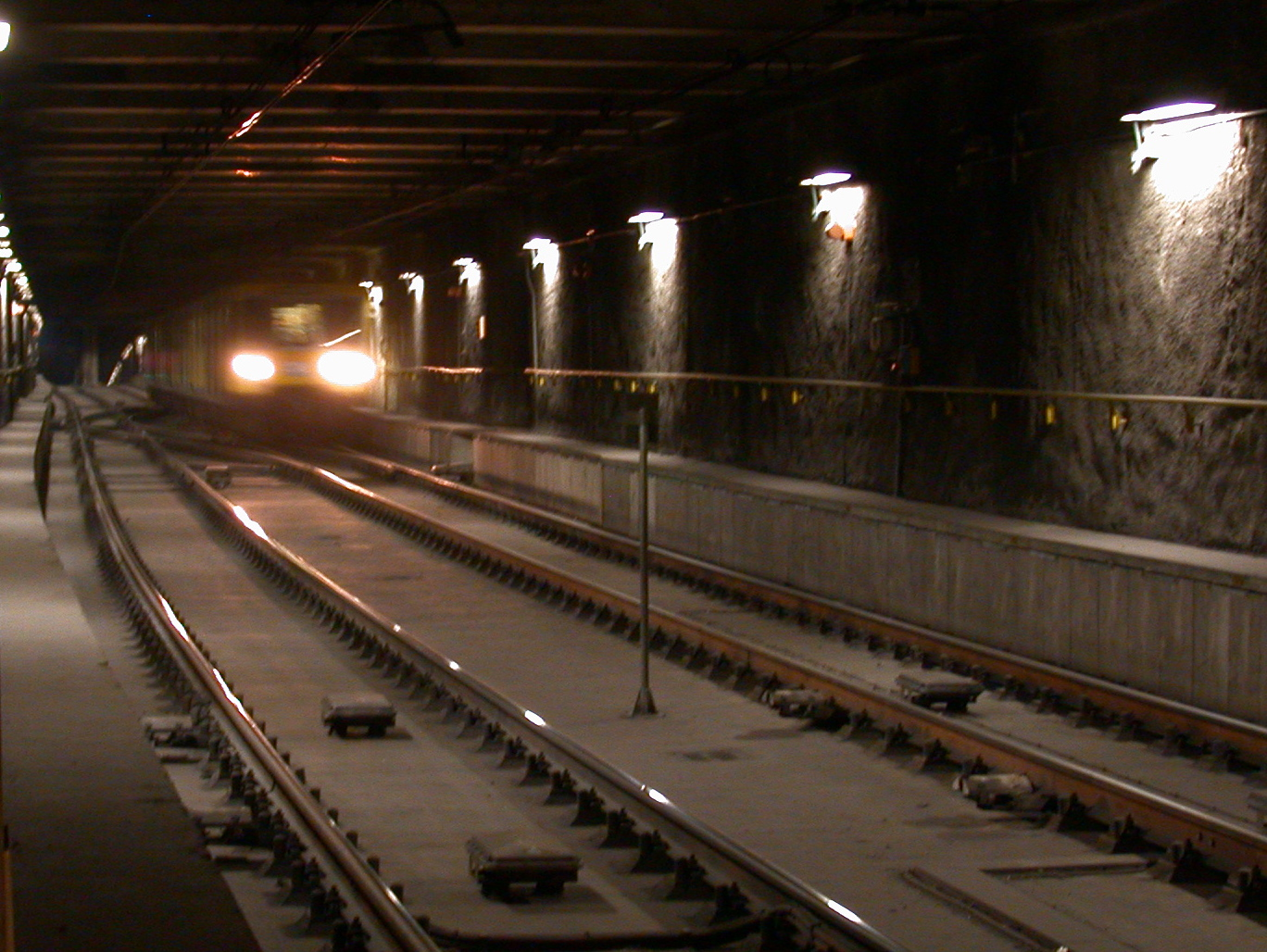
View of a tunnel of the line (section Vanvitelli-Medaglie d'Oro)

The line is entirely underground starting from Colli Aminei station, while preceding sections are elevated on viaducts. The track gauge used is 1,435 mm (4 ft 8 1/2 in), with electric traction powered by direct current at 1500 V DC via an overhead catenary. Each station is equipped with two side platforms serving specific directions, except in cases of operational limitations. Stations are designed with a single tunnel containing both tracks, except for special sections like those connecting Montedonzelli and Piscinola Scampia stations, where trains run in separate tunnels.

In the oldest section from Colli Aminei to Vanvitelli, the tracks are laid on a gravel bed, while in other sections, the tracks rest directly on a concrete base inside the tunnels. Train circulation generally follows the right-hand track, in line with typical metro network conventions. In case of emergencies or disruptions, trains can reverse direction at designated stations such as Capodichino, Vanvitelli, and Università.

The unique geological and hydrogeological conditions of the city influenced the construction of the line, leading to the adoption of various engineering solutions to address the terrain characteristics, including layers of tuff and other typical rock formations of the area.

The operational line spans 20.7 kilometres (12.9 mi) (and will be approximately 35 kilometres (22 mi) upon completion) with nineteen stations.

== Route ==
Line 1 (Naples Metro)

Station	Image	Transfer	Opened
Piscinola Scampia		Metro Line 11	July 19, 1995
Chiaiano-Marianella			July 19, 1995
Frullone-San Rocco			July 19, 1995
Colli Aminei			March 28, 1993
Policlinico (Hospital)			March 28, 1993
Rione Alto			March 28, 1993
Montedonzelli			March 28, 1993
Medaglie d'Oro			March 28, 1993
Vanvitelli		Central, Chiaia and Montesanto Funiculars	March 28, 1993
Quattro Giornate			April 14, 2001
Salvator Rosa			April 14, 2001
Materdei			July 5, 2003
Museo (National Archaeological Museum)		Line 2	April 14, 2001
Dante			March 27, 2002
Toledo			September 17, 2012
Municipio Porto (Town Hall / Port)		Line 6	June 2, 2015
Università (University)			March 26, 2011
Duomo (Cathedral)			August 6, 2021
Garibaldi (Central Station)		Central railway station, Circumvesuviana, Line 2	December 31, 2013
Centro Direzionale (Business Center)		Circumvesuviana (suspended until 2027)	April 1, 2025
Tribunale (Court)		Under construction	est. 2026
Poggioreale		Under construction	-
Capodichino (Naples International Airport)		Under construction	est. 2027
Miano		Under construction	est. 2026
Regina Margherita		Under construction	-
Secondigliano		Under construction	-
Di Vittorio		Under construction	-

=== Future expansion ===
Extension work is underway between Centro Direzionale and Capodichino (Naples International Airport). Once completed, Line 1 will become a circular line of 25 km (15.5 mi).

== Rolling stock ==
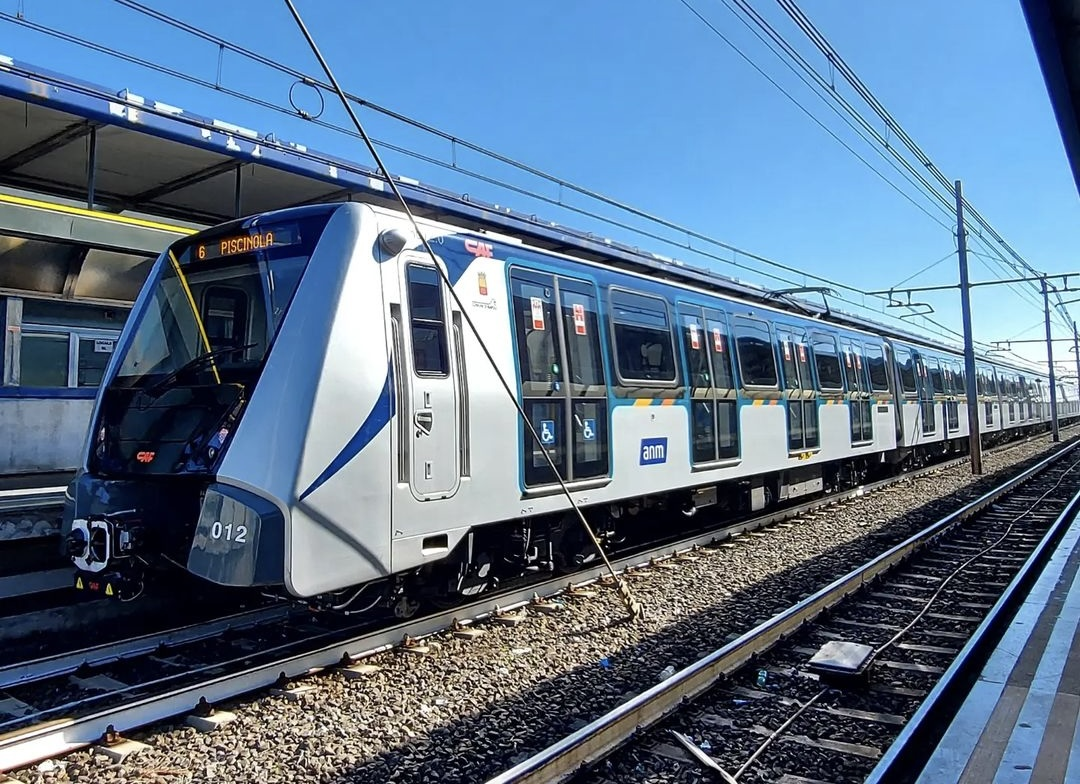
CAF Inneo train in 2022.

=== CAF Inneo trains ===
The CAF Inneo trains consist of six-car formations arranged as Tc-M-M-M-M-Tc, with driving trailer cars classified as R.0XX and intermediate motor cars classified as M.0XX. A total of 24 trainsets, each 108 meters long and comprising six cars, will be delivered, with a capacity of 1,200 passengers.

The first 10 CAF Inneo trains, costing €87.6 million, were purchased in 2017 from the Spanish company Construcciones y Auxiliar de Ferrocarriles (CAF). This procurement was necessitated by prolonged waiting times caused by the insufficient number of trainsets for the line's expansion and the advanced age of the previous fleet, the nearly 30-year-old Metronapoli M1 trains. Subsequently, the order was increased to 24 trainsets, with an additional investment totaling €192 million. In October 2019, the first images of the new INNEO trains under construction at CAF’s San Sebastián (Spain) facility were unveiled by then-Mayor Luigi de Magistris. The first train was delivered on March 9, 2020, at the onset of the lockdown prompted by the breakout of the COVID-19 pandemic in Italy. This delayed the start of the necessary tests for their commissioning, which began only in July 2020.

The commissioning of the first train took place on October 18, 2022, in the presence of Mayor Gaetano Manfredi.

As of June 2025, 17 CAF Inneo trains have been certified and are operational. As of September 2025, 10 trains are in daily service on the line.

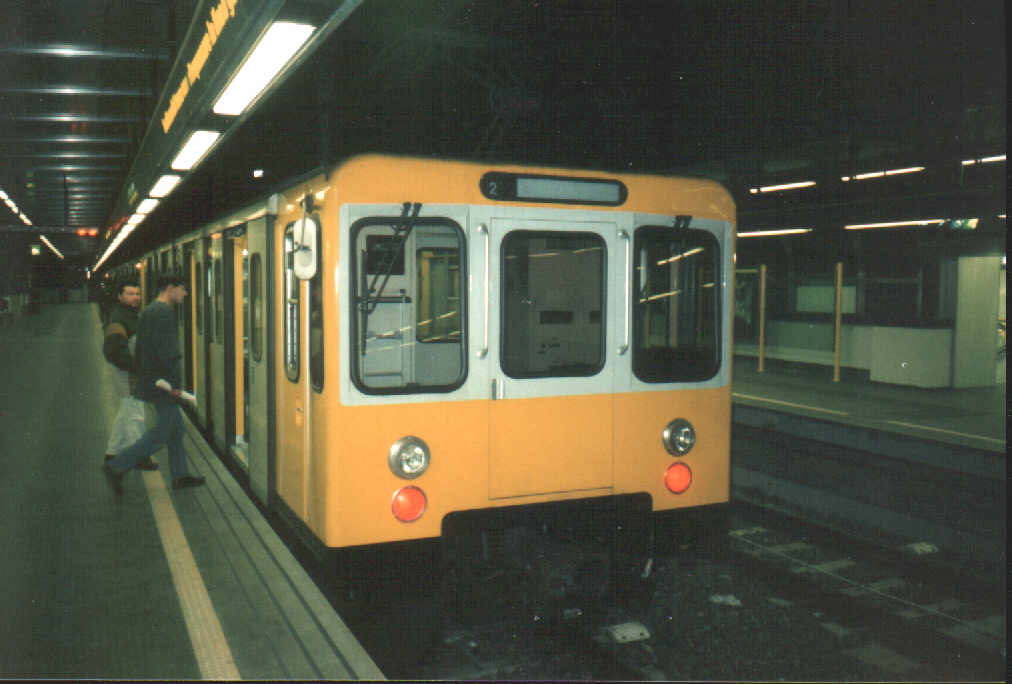
M1 train in 1996.

=== M1 trains (1993–2024) ===
The first trains to enter service on the line were the M1 Series electric multiple units, produced by a consortium consisting of Firema Trasporti (then Officine Fiore), Ansaldo Trasporti, and Sofer-Breda Costruzioni Ferroviarie. They were designed in the 1980s, built between 1991 and 1992, and have been in operation since 1993. The design was largely inspired by the MA 100 series trains of the Rome Metro. Over the years, the number of trains available has steadily decreased, with only 4 vehicles (12 traction units in triple formation) still in circulation on the line as of 2023. In 2024, the remaining units were withdrawn from service and stored in reserve, to be reactivated only in case of emergency.

== Ridership ==
In 1993, with the opening of the Vanvitelli–Colli Aminei section, Line 1 of the Naples Metro recorded a flow of around 3 million passengers, averaging roughly 500,000 per station per year. Vanvitelli station registered the highest ridership, with nearly one million annual passengers. The subsequent extension in 1995, aimed at connecting the Vomero district with the northern suburbs, led to a significant increase in demand.

By 2001, the opening of additional sections and the strengthened connection to the northern periphery brought annual ridership to 15 million—five times the 1993 figure. Accessibility improvements in outlying neighborhoods boosted flows in particular at Piscinola–Scampia (1.2 million passengers) and Chiaiano (2.2 million). The inauguration of new stations along the line further contributed to growth, with some stations seeing increases of up to 400%. Vanvitelli rose to 3.94 million passengers per year, while Medaglie d’Oro reached 2.58 million. On average, traffic per station stood at 1.4 million passengers.

In 2011, full operation of the Piscinola–Dante line pushed ridership to 30 million annually, an increase of about 16 million in just a decade. Within this context, the opening of Dante station elevated Museo to a key role, handling 6 million passengers per year thanks to its interchange with Cavour station and its proximity to Montesanto on Line 2. Intermodality and the high density of stations in the historic center helped distribute passenger flows more evenly along the so-called “lower section” of the line.

The 2019 opening of Toledo, Municipio, Università, and Garibaldi stations generated a further 20% increase compared to 2011. Garibaldi emerged as the system’s main hub, serving 8 million passengers annually and functioning as a critical interchange with the regional railway and high-speed rail network. Toledo station, internationally recognized for its architectural design, recorded 4 million passengers and became an effective interchange with Montesanto on Line 2. Overall, demand on Line 1 became more evenly balanced among central stations, partly due to their close proximity in the historic core.

The enhanced coverage provided by the metro has contributed to a measurable reduction in road congestion, previously driven by private motorized traffic. Studies on the system’s impact highlight a sharp decline in the use of cars and motorcycles from the very beginning. In 1993 alone, with the opening of the first six stations, around one million travelers switched from private vehicles to the metro. By 2019, that figure had risen to 11 million, corresponding to an estimated saving of about 40 million vehicle-kilometers.

=== Socio-economic analysis ===
A socio-economic analysis of Line 1's ridership, based on a 2018 study conducted by the University of Campania Luigi Vanvitelli was carried out through a sample survey on a typical weekday, with an estimated 150,000 passengers. Of these, about 70% were identified as regular users of the line, while the remaining share consisted of occasional riders. Regular passengers came predominantly from the municipality of Naples (50%) and, to a significant extent, from the surrounding province (40%). Age distribution was found to be balanced, with the majority of trips motivated by work (60%) and study (20%). Among daily commuters, the most common professional categories were office employees and self-employed professionals. Occasional users also included passengers from outside the region, many of whom used Line 1 primarily for tourism.

Analysis of passenger flows confirmed that a substantial share of ridership originated in the northern peripheral stations (Piscinola–Scampia, Chiaiano–Marianella, Frullone) as well as from the wider metropolitan area.

== See also ==
- Naples Metro
- Art Stations of the Naples Metro
- List of Naples metro stations
- List of metro systems
