= Poggioreale station =

Metro station in Naples, Italy

Coordinates: 40.8669°N 14.2918°E

Poggioreale

General information
- System: Naples Metro station
- Operator: ANM
- Line: Line 1
- Connections: Urban and suburban buses

Other information
- Status: Under construction
Route map
Location

Poggioreale will be a station on Line 1 of the Naples Metro located in the homonymous hemicycle, in the immediate vicinity of the Naples-Baiano line of the Circumvesuviana with which it will constitute an interchange.

== History ==
The project uses Stefano Gasse's old customs barrier as the entrance to the station and transforms the pre-existing hemicycle into a portico open to transit and to the pedestrian spaces behind it, highlighting the entrance to the monumental cemetery of Poggioreale, located opposite. A skylight will be built in front of the building which will allow light to penetrate the floors below while in the evening the lighting coming from inside becomes the characterizing element of a redeveloped public space, connected to the surface tramway network. The previous station will be Tribunale, the next will be Capodichino Aeroporto. In June 2015, the hemicycle was closed and the station construction site was set up.

== Services ==
The station has:

- Passing bus and tram stop
