= Capodichino station =

Metro station in Naples, Italy

Coordinates: 40.8754°N 14.2855°E

Capodichino
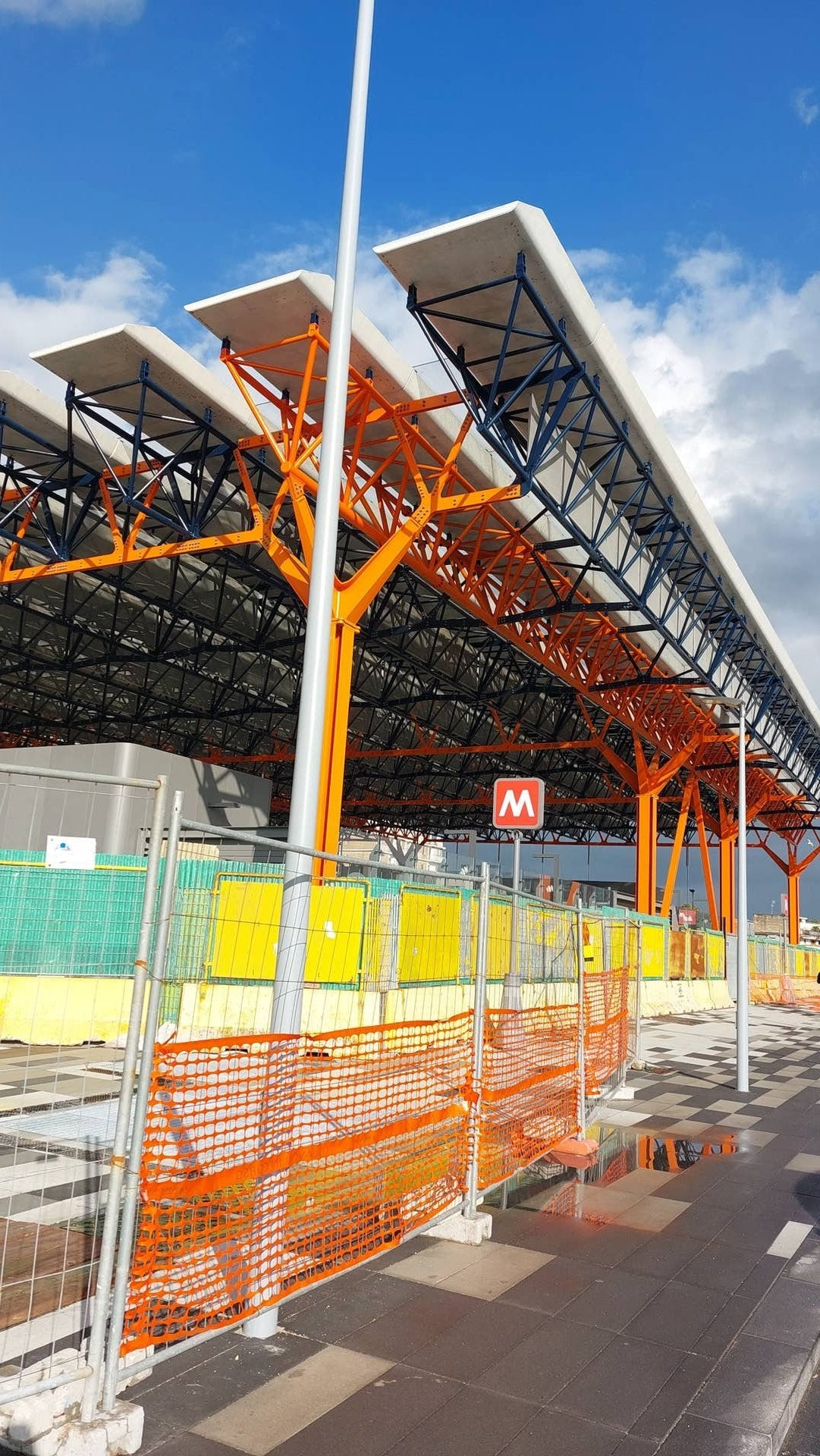

General information
- System: Naples Metro station
- Operator: ANM
- Line: Line 1
- Connections: Urban and suburban buses

Other information
- Status: Under construction
Route map
Location

Capodichino will be a Naples Metro station on line 1, located near the Naples Capodichino International Airport. It is named after the suburb Capodichino of Naples.

== History ==
On December 15, 2013, the CIPE approved a 650 million euro loan for the Garibaldi-Capodichino section, including the intermediate stops at the Centro Direzionale, Tribunale and Poggioreale. On 2 August 2014, construction work was officially inaugurated. On 31 March 2021, the first tunnel connecting the Poggioreale and Capodichino stations was completed using a tunnel boring machine (TBM). On 8 March 2024, excavation of the second tunnel was complete

The completion of the works, initially foreseen by the CIPE for 2018, are now expected to be finished between late 2026 and early 2027.

== Station layout ==
The new metro station redesigns access to the airport with covered pedestrian walkways and a capillary network of roads, connected to the parking area. The project characterizes the terminal with the large translucent round roof that allows natural light to penetrate from above into the deep central shaft. The vertical path comes alive with the movement of travelers: the elevators and the spiral of the escalators orient and distribute the flows of arrivals and departures.

== Connections ==
The station will have:

- Bus stop
