= Duomo station =

Metro station in Naples, Italy

Coordinates: 40°50′51″N 14°15′42″E

Duomo
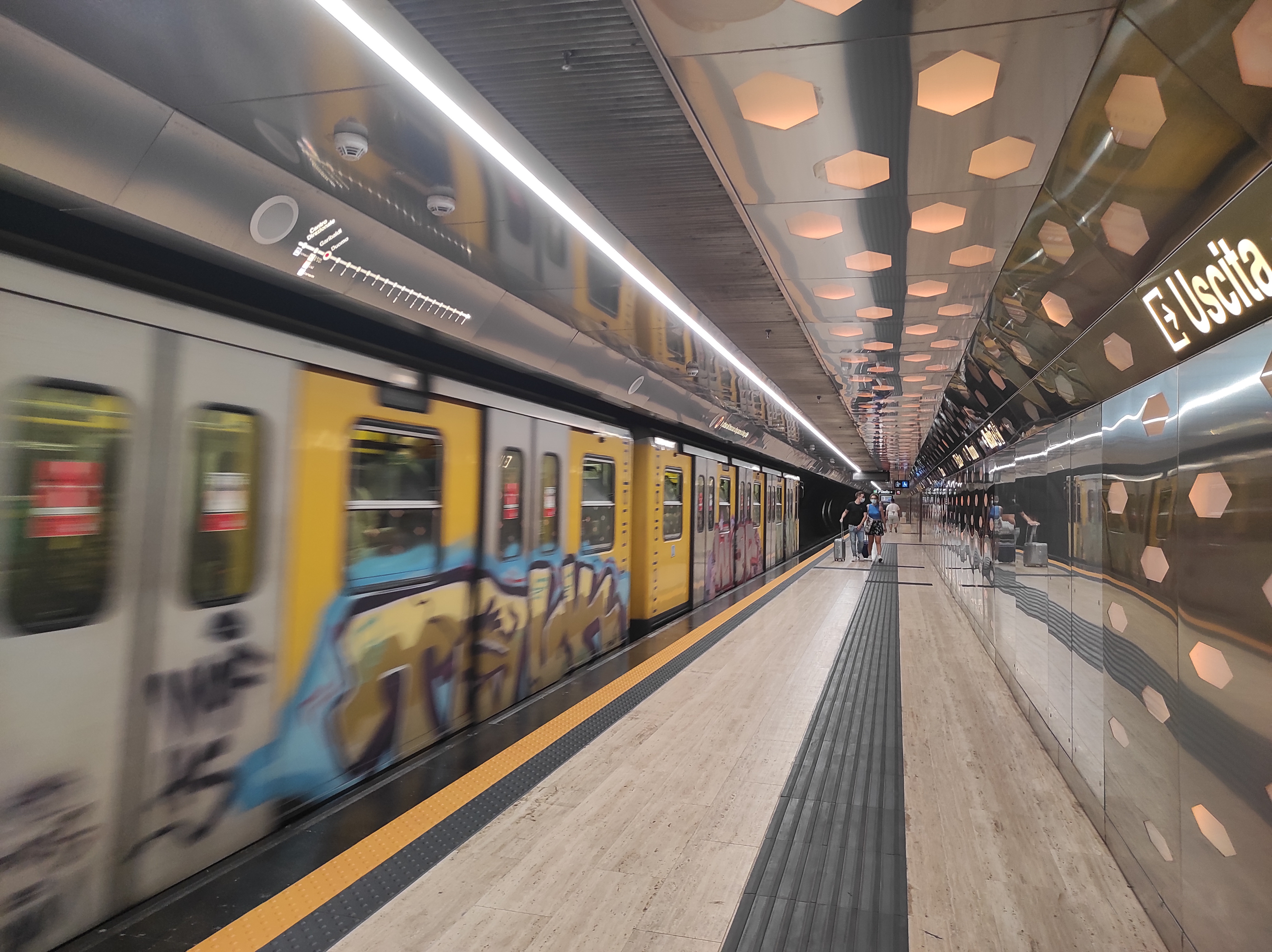

General information
- Location: Piazza Nicola Amore, Naples
- System: Naples Metro station
- Operator: ANM
- Line: Line 1
- Connections: Urban and suburban buses, trolleybuses

Other information
- Status: Operational

History
- Opening: 6 August 2021

Services
Preceding station	Naples Metro	Following station
Università towards Piscinola Scampia	Line 1	Garibaldi towards Centro Direzionale
Route map
Location

Duomo is a Naples Metro underground station that serves Line 1. It opened on 6 August 2021.

It is located near Naples Cathedral (Italian: Duomo di Napoli), after which it is named.

Designed by the Italian architect Massimiliano Fuksas, the station is located at a central roundabout in Corso Umberto I (Rettifilo), with secondary entrances along Via Marina and Via Duomo.

== See also ==
- List of Naples Metro stations
