= Capodichino (disambiguation) =

Capodichino may refer to:

- Capodichino, suburb of Naples
- Naples-Capodichino Airport, airport in Naples, Italy
- Capodichino (Naples Metro), metro station in Naples
