= Art Stations of the Naples Metro =

The Art Stations of Naples Metro consists of 12 stations along Line 1 and Line 6 of the Naples Metro with art installations. In total, there are more than 250 works of art.

With the construction and expansion of numerous metro lines the municipality of Naples developed the project Stations of Art (also known as Hundred Stations Plan), with which it was intended to entrust the planning of metro stops to well-known contemporary artists and architects. Then, with a resolution (resolution of 19 May 2006 Number 637), the Campania region issued guidelines to be applied to the design and construction of a station.

The Art Stations, distributed along the lines 1 and 6 of the Metro network, include more than 180 pieces of art created by 90 international authors and by some young local architects, allowing them to combine different architectural styles. On 30 November 2012, the Toledo station was elected by The Daily Telegraph as the most beautiful subway station in Europe and the world, a recognition echoed by CNN’s rankings; while the Materdei station resulted in 13th place.

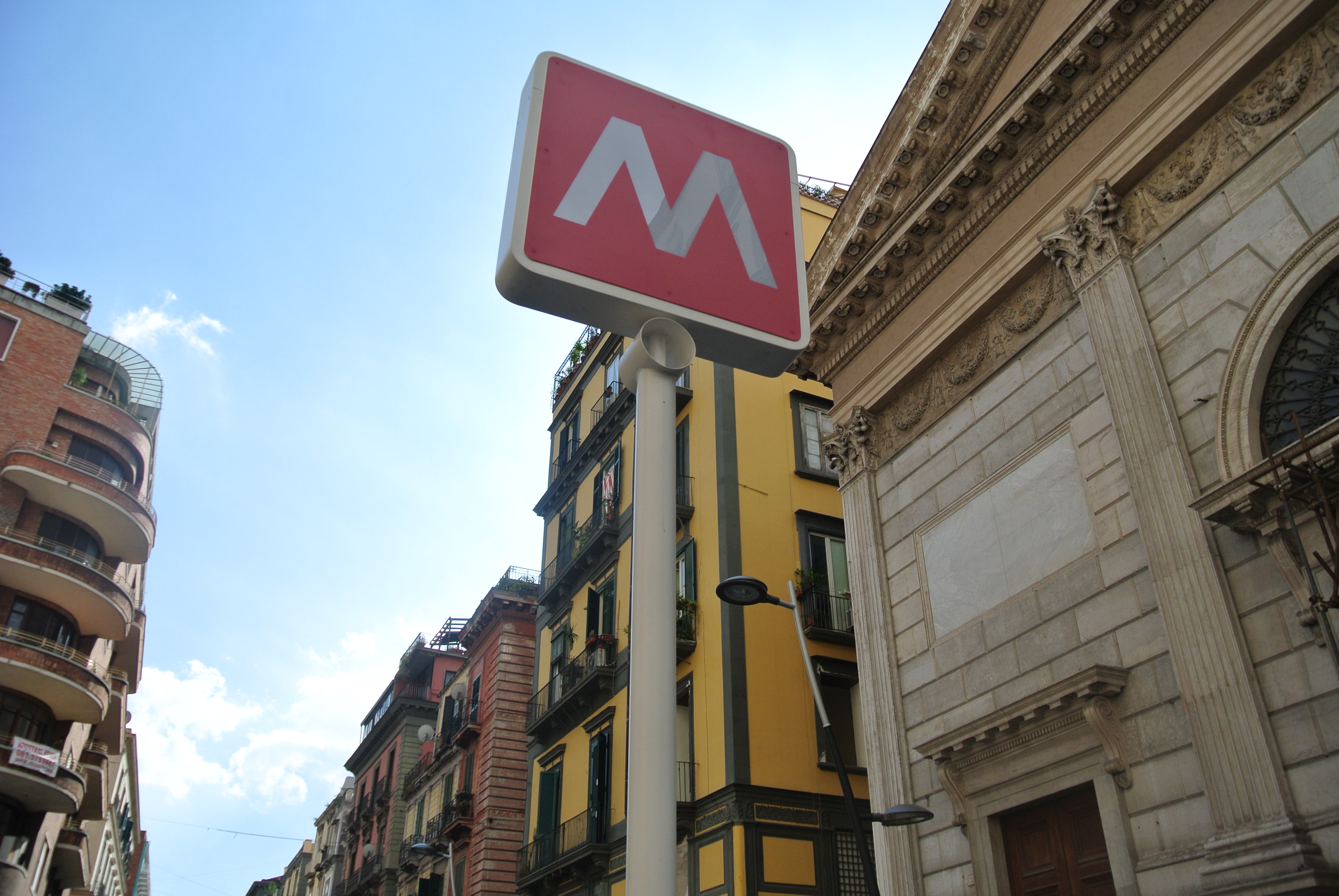
Signs in the Art Stations are simple and clear. In the photo, the Toledo Metro stop, with the Church of San Nicola alla Carità on the right.

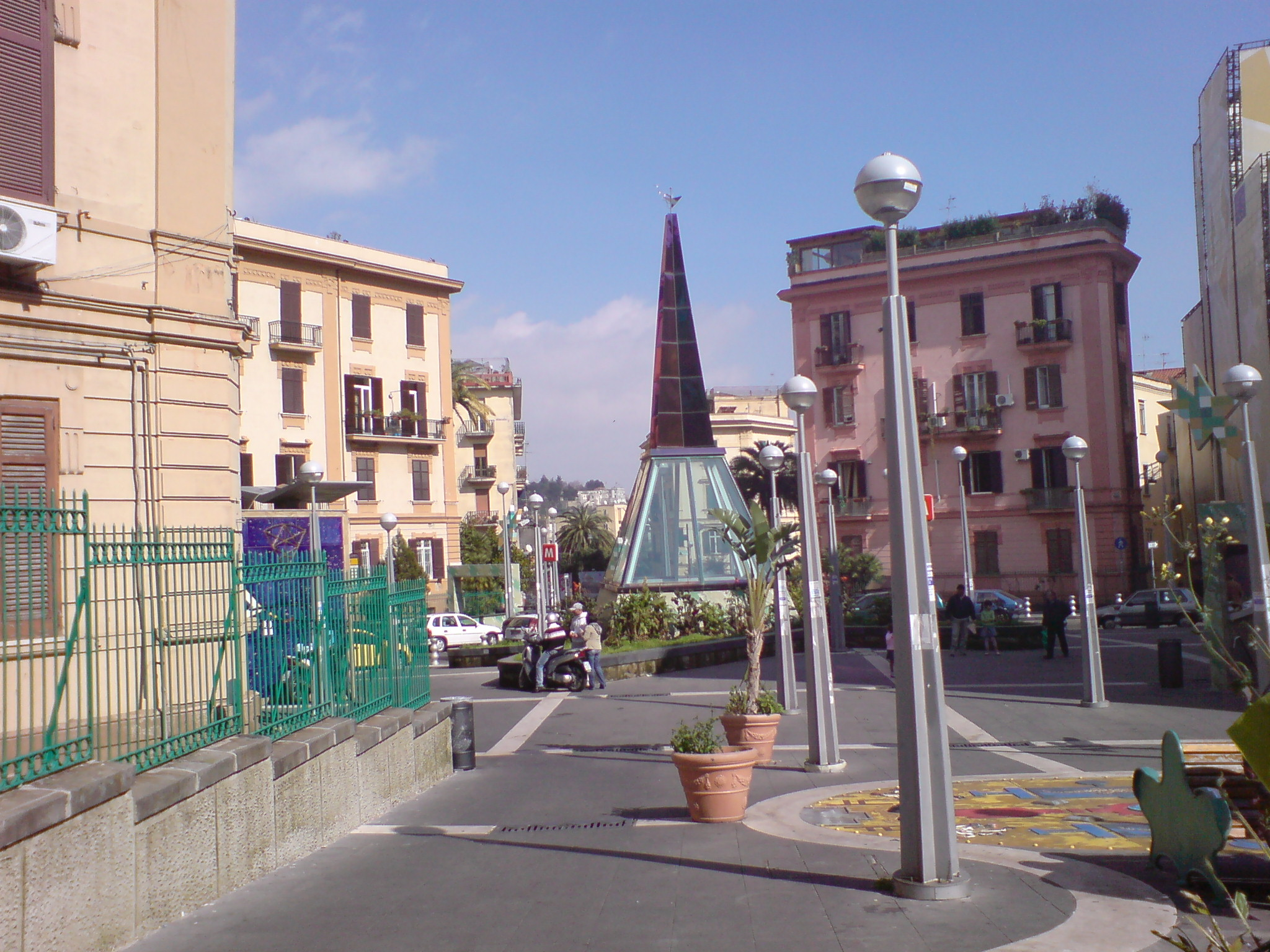
A refurbished piazza Scipione Ammirato, at Materdei, after the excavation works.

== Line 1 ==
=== Garibaldi ===
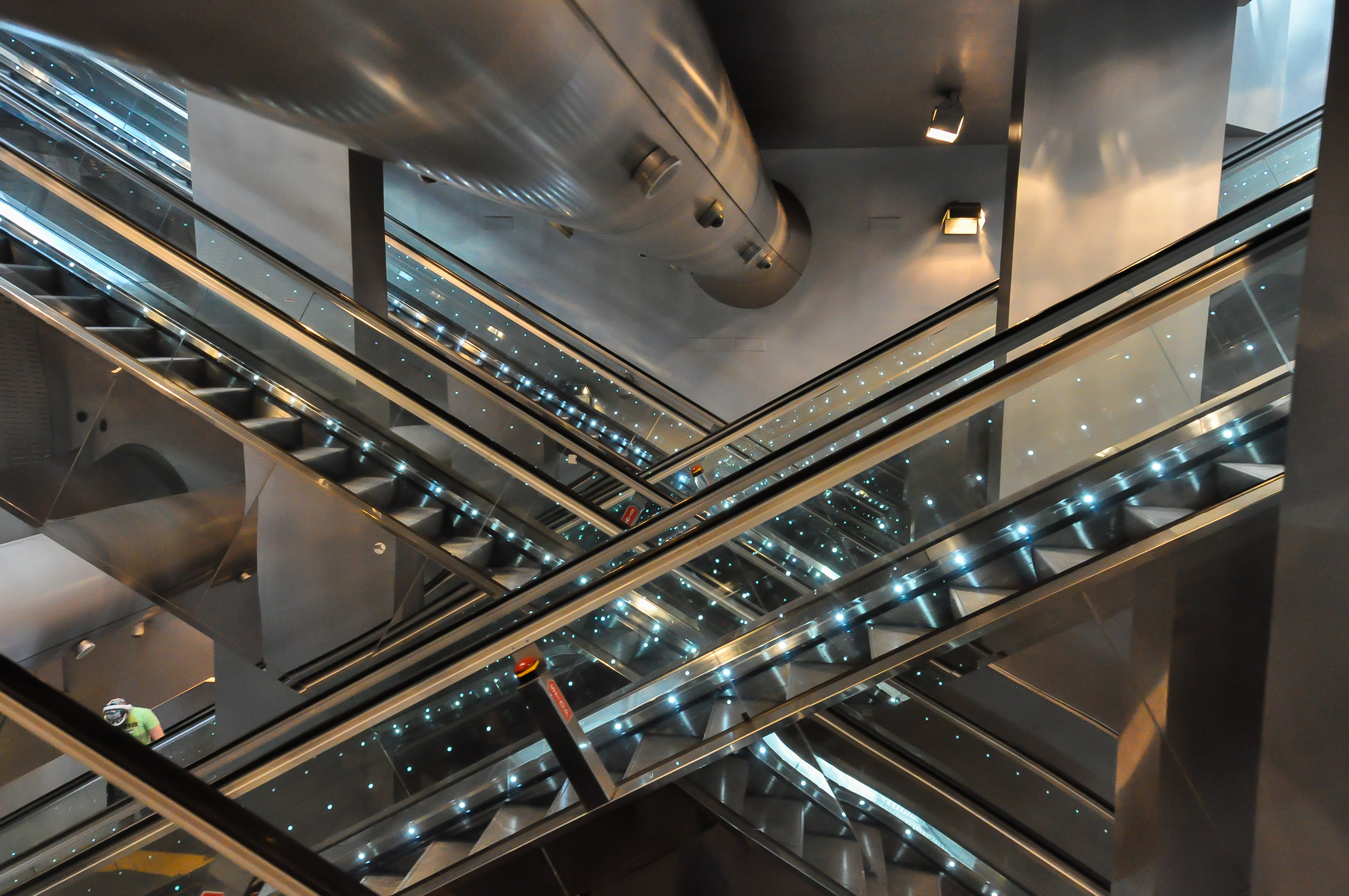
Garibaldi station

=== Università ===
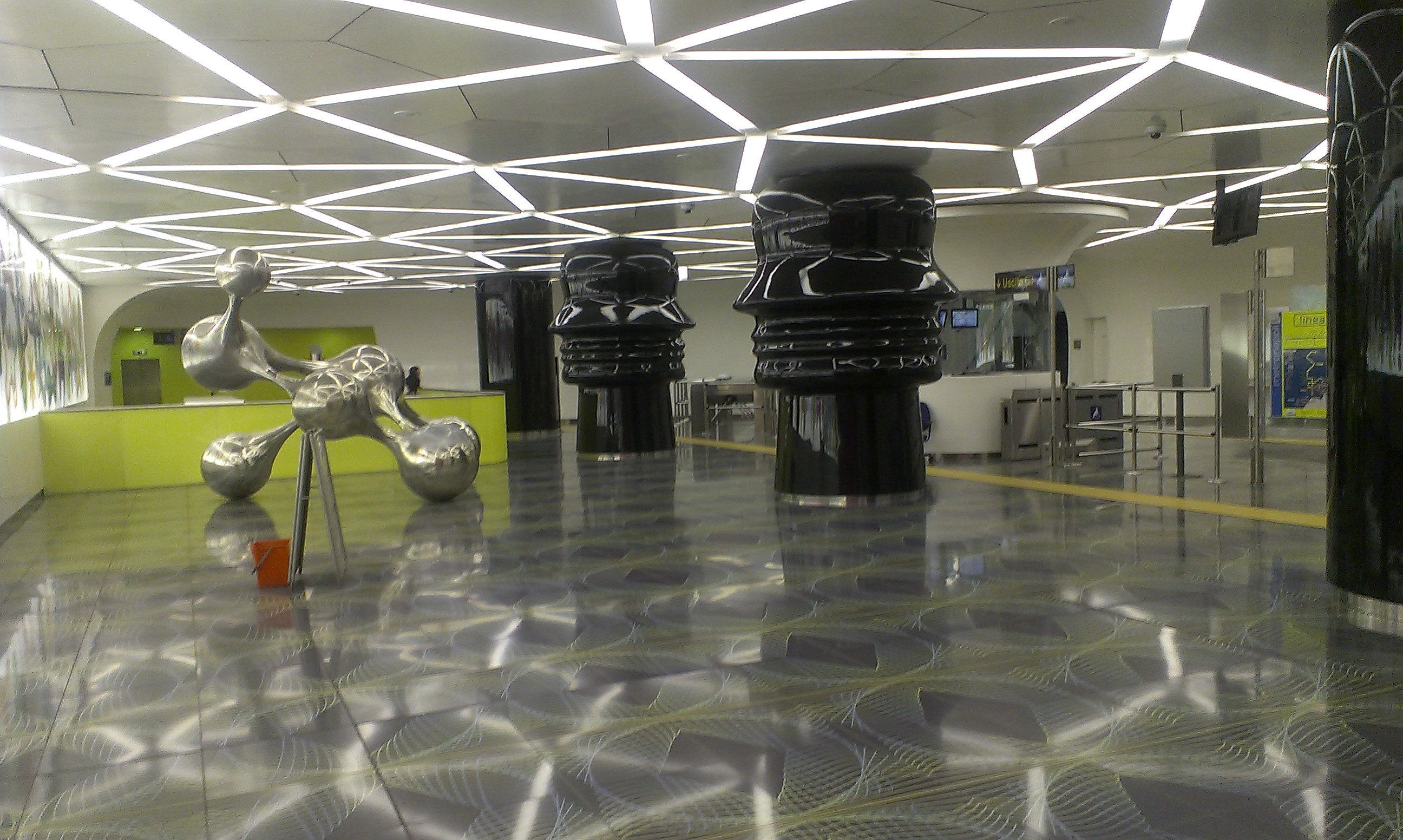
Università station

Università (University) Station, designed by architects Karim Rashid, was inaugurated on March 26, 2011, thirty feet below street level, at the intersection between Piazza Giovanni Bovio and Corso Umberto I.

The metro stop, eclectic and full of color, has been designed to symbolize digital and information. In fact, Rashid said that he imagined spaces "that embodies the knowledge and language of the new digital era, which transmit ideas of simultaneous communication, innovation and their mobility of the Third Technological Revolution." In fact, next to the steps leading to the station, were put ceramic tile on which you can find many words coined since the 1960s as "network", "operating","laptop", "database" "interface" or "software".

The station hall is characterized by very striking panels and colors, the materials used to produce them are Corian and mirrored steel. In the interior there is a strong contrast between the two main colors, fuchsia pink and lime, which are also useful for direct the user to the docks.

In the lobby there are numerous works of art. Beyond the turnstiles there is the artwork Conversational Profile, two large cylindrical pillars in which it is possible to see two faces in profile, symbolizing the dialogue and communication between human beings. The second artwork, Ikon, is a large light box, in which several three-dimensional figures seem to float. Instead, among the black pillars and the light box stands Synapsi (or Synopsis), a sculpture in brushed steel which refers to human intelligence and the neural network of the brain.

=== Municipio ===
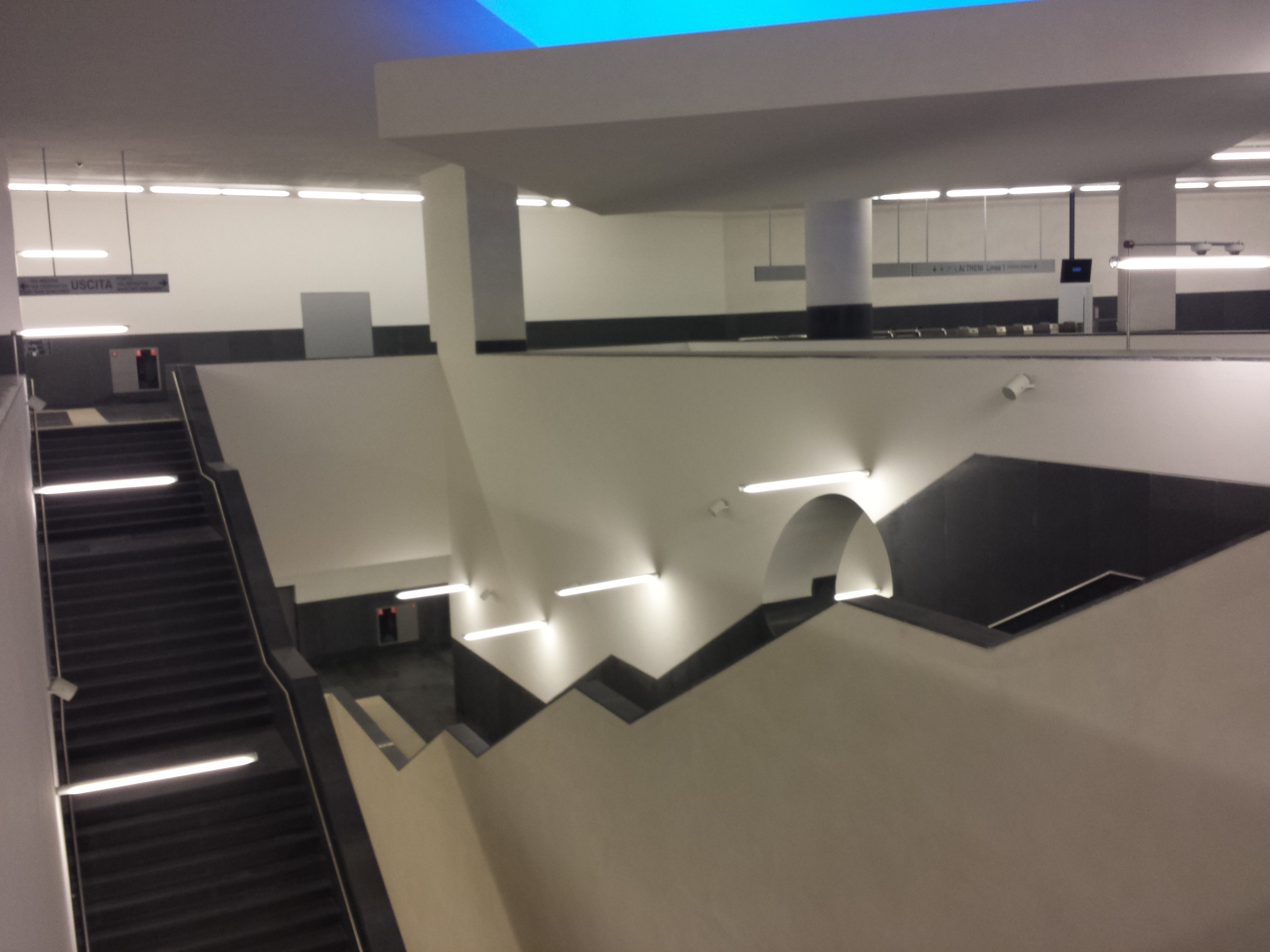
Municipio station
