= Garibaldi station (Naples) =

Naples Metro station

Coordinates: 40.8525°N 14.2720°E

Garibaldi
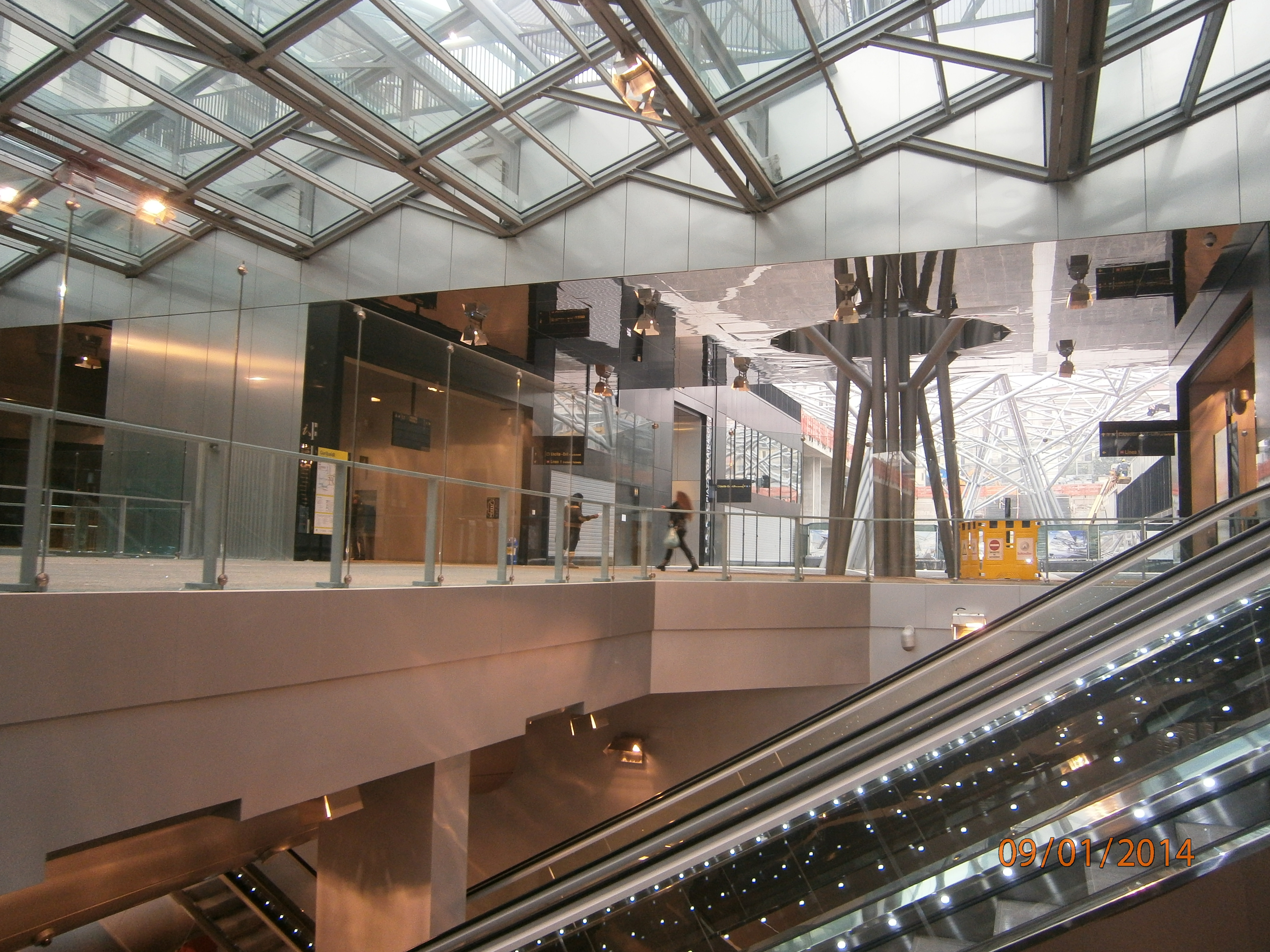

General information
- System: Naples Metro station
- Operator: ANM
- Line: Line 1
- Connections: Napoli Centrale railway station Napoli Garibaldi railway station (Circumvesuviana); Urban and suburban buses, trolley-buses

Construction
- Structure type: In use

History
- Opened: 31 December 2013

Services
Preceding station	Naples Metro	Following station
Duomo towards Piscinola Scampia	Line 1	Centro Direzionale Terminus
Route map
Location

Garibaldi is a Naples Metro underground station that serves Line 1, adjacent and connected through an underground passage to the Naples Central railway station and the Circumvesuviana network. It was opened on 31 December 2013 as a one-station extension from Università.

== See also ==
- List of Naples Metro stations
