= Colli Aminei =

Area of Naples, Italy

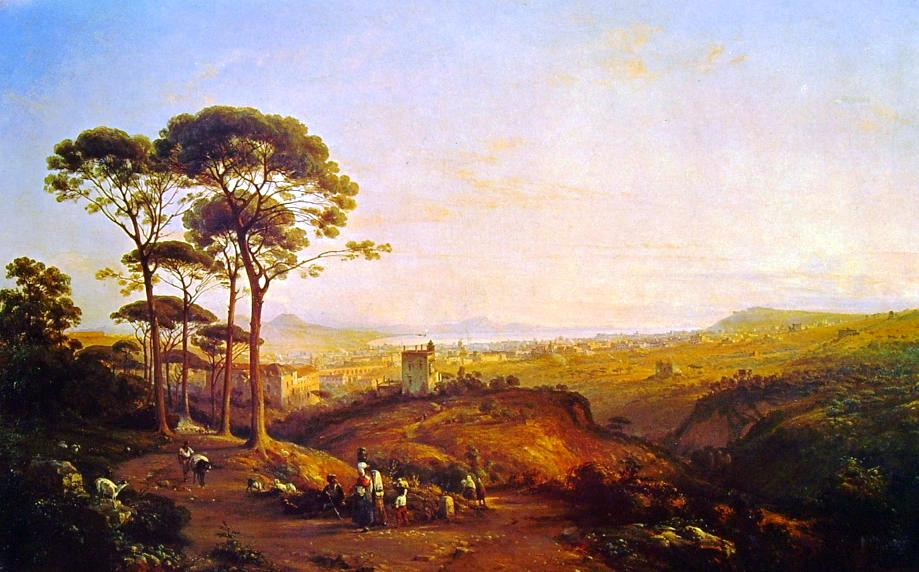
Teodoro Duclère - Napoli dalla Conocchia

The Colli Aminei are an area of Naples, Italy, that is part of the municipality of Stella-San Carlo at the Arena, specifically of the Stella district. It is bordered to the west and north by the Vallone di San Rocco, to the east by the Capodimonte ascent, to the south by the valleys of the Scudillo and the Fontanelle.

== Etymology ==
The name Colli Aminei ("Aminei Hills") was coined in ancient times: the beauty of the places, used as a vegetable garden, struck the Neapolitan inhabitants, who called them pleasant hills, from which the current name derives from deformation. Another interpretation traces the name "Aminei" to a population of Thessaly, also mentioned by Aristotle, who colonized the area during the Doric period, planting numerous vineyards on the hill called Capodimonte which produced the famous vino amineo, cited by Macrobio, that the Romans called Falerno.

== History ==
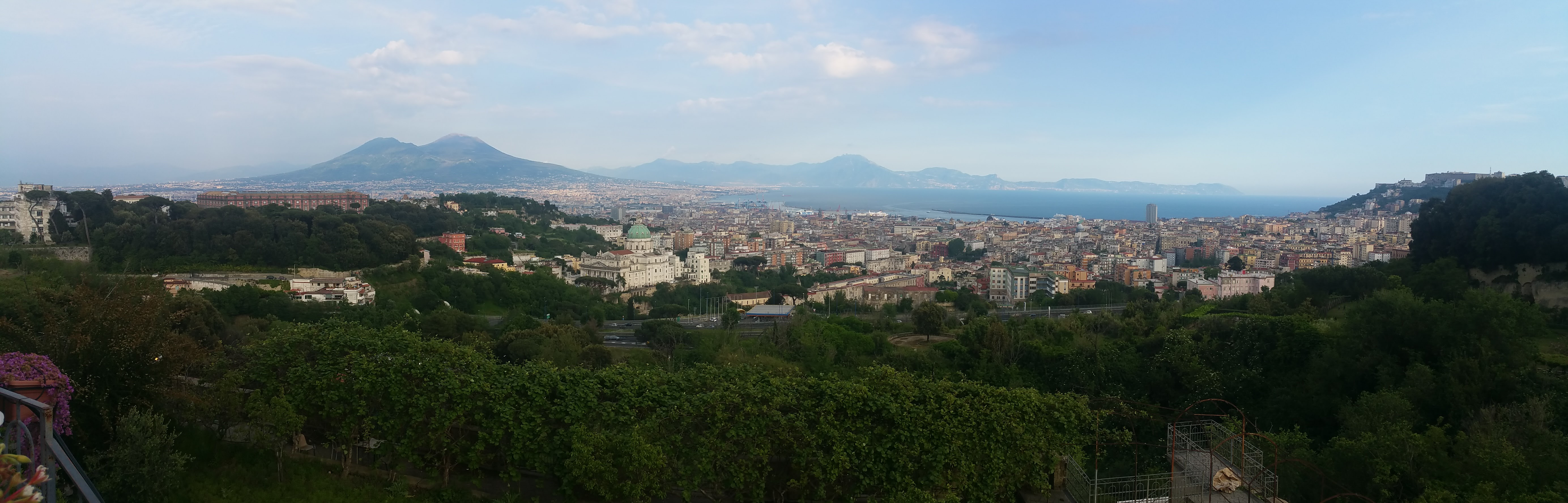
Panorama of the Colli Aminei

Since Roman times, the Hills, along with Capodimonte, were considered a renowned resort and healthy air, thanks to the presence of thick woods. The Roman presence is evidenced by the ruins of the Mausoleo della Conocchia, a Roman sepulchral monument, which was very famous even in the romantic age, helping to attract foreign travelers and tourists to the area.

Following the extraction limitations decreed in the city boundaries, in the 18th century the area (then outside the city, like the other hilly areas of Vomero, Posillipo and Arenella) saw the extraction of the tuff, in particular near the valley of San Rocco, both open-air and through underground quarries with access from above (latomie) or lateral from the valley itself (caves). During the Second World War the caves were used to guarantee the productive continuity of the Neapolitan aeronautical industries (for example IMAM - Southern Aeronautical Mechanical Industries) also under Allied bombing.

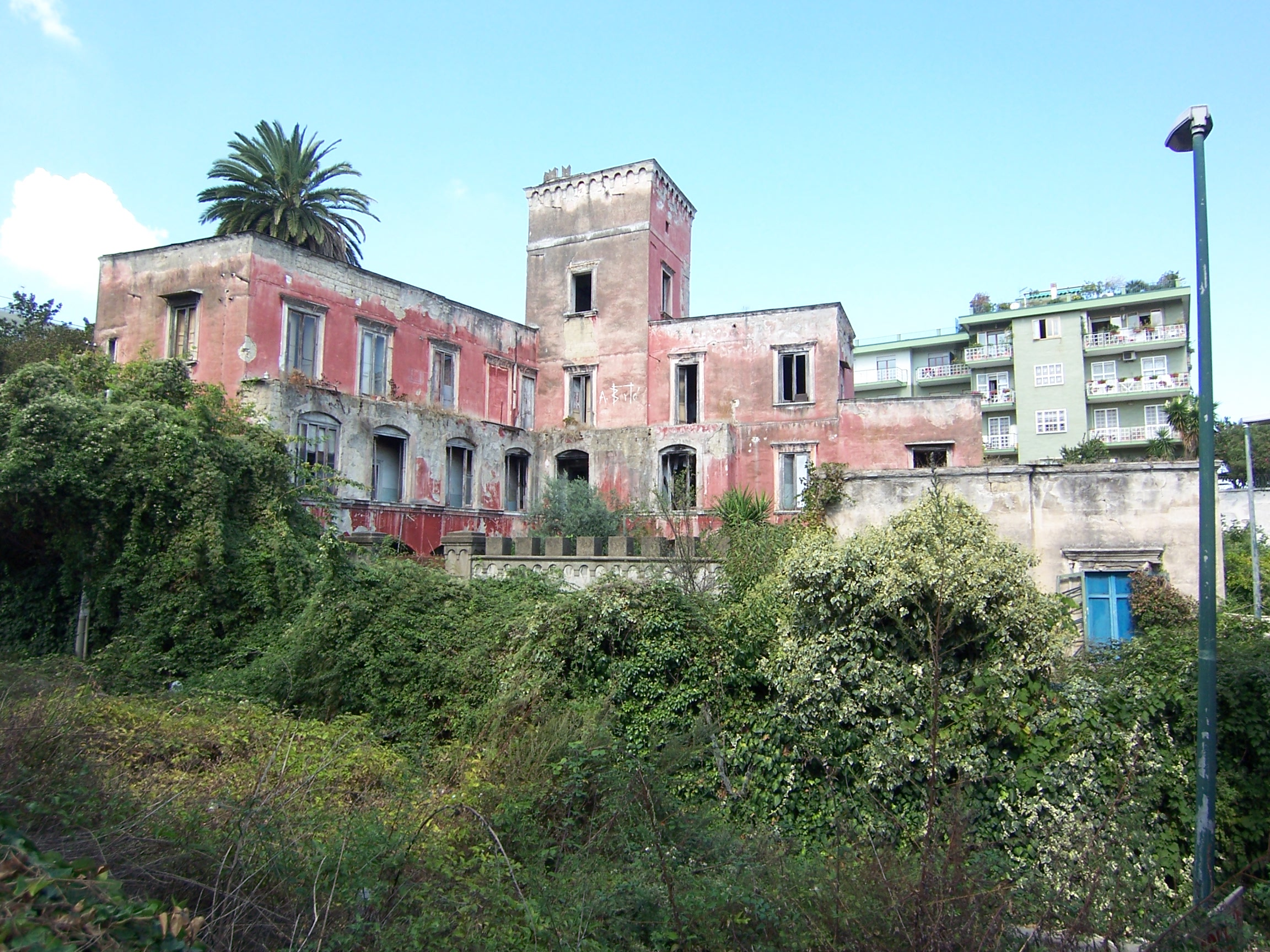
Torre Caselli, country house of the Marquis Caselli in the Colli Aminei, now in ruins. The last inhabitant was the painter Antonio Berté (until the early 1990s).

Open mining, albeit in reduced form, continues today. The caves and the latomie are instead abandoned, although presenting a significant tourist potential as finds of industrial archaeology and for the natural context in which they are inserted.

The urbanization of the Neapolitan hills reached the neighborhood in the sixties; fortunately the latomies and the inaccessible topography have limited the building disfigurement. Today the district has a densely inhabited area, with a population of about 30,000 inhabitants, surrounded by a green area, used as a public park or agricultural crops.

The neighborhood is mainly residential. There are numerous small businesses, as well as a small induced from the many hospitals present in the Hospital Area, as well as the Juvenile Court of Naples and the relevant First Reception Center. It houses the headquarters of the Archiepiscopal Seminary of Naples, and of the Pontifical Theological Faculty of Southern Italy.

== Transport and traffic ==
The Colli Aminei constitute a hinge of the city connections on the north-south axis, also due to the presence of the Colli Aminei station of Line 1 (Naples subway) with attached multi-storey car park. The roads are Viale Colli Aminei and Via Nicolardi; many crosses depart from both, named after plants and flowers, in memory of the historical natural beauty of the places. Originally the cross streets of Viale Colli Aminei were private streets that were part of large apartment buildings (Parco La Pineta, Rione Sapio). The sleepers were later acquired by the Municipality.

== Parks ==
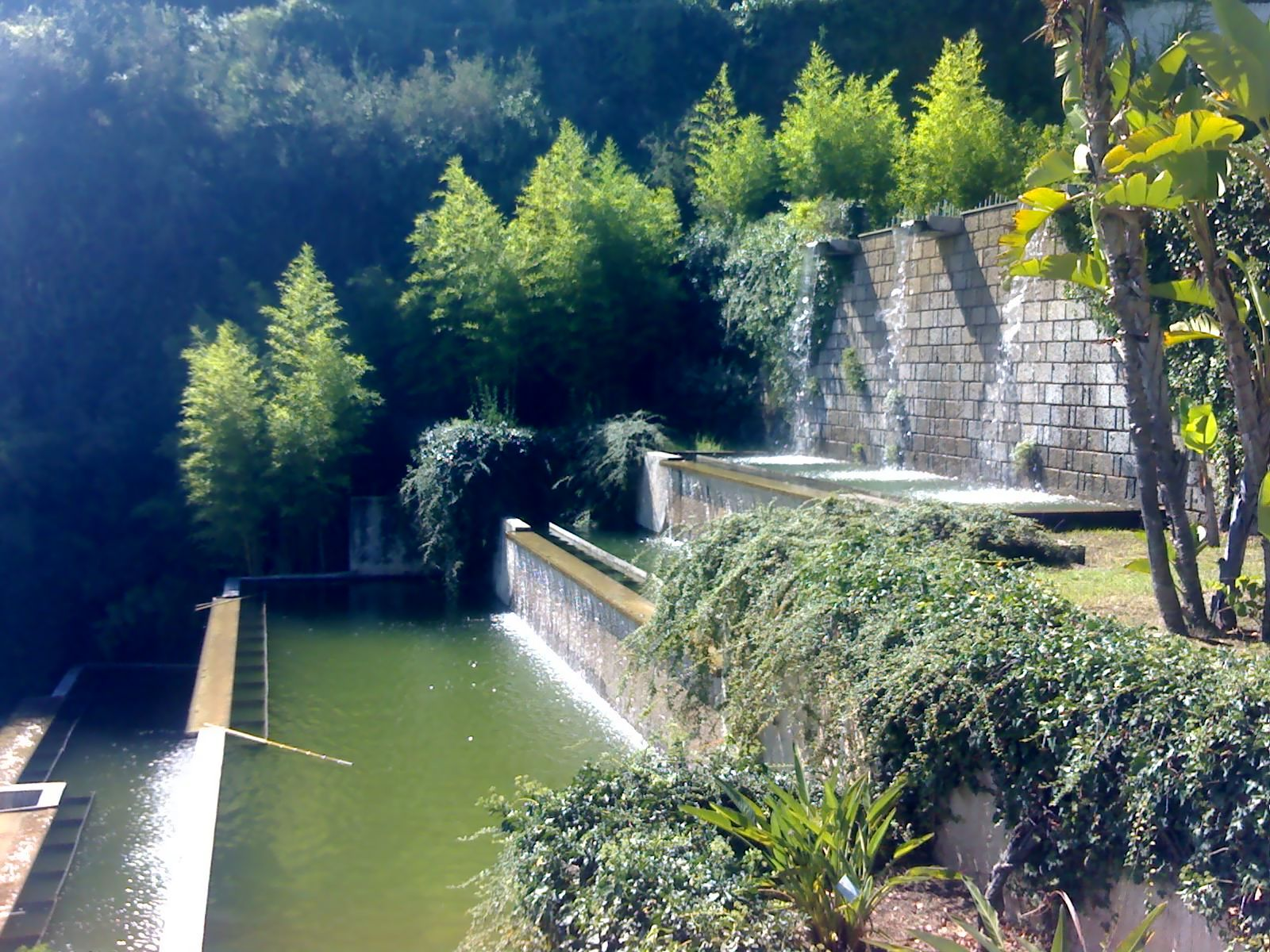
The parco del Poggio

Several urban parks are present in the neighborhood or in its immediate vicinity. Of rare beauty is the Parco del Poggio, opened in 2001, which winds along the slope of the hill that faces the sea. It gives a view of Naples from a fairly high point that embraces Vesuvius, almost in front, and the area of Piazza Municipio with the Vomero hill overlooking it. Inside the park has a pergola path that descends towards its lowest point (right above the Naples ring road), an area equipped for children, a mini botanical garden with an exhibition of exotic plants, and above all an artificial lake, surrounded by masonry seats like an arena. At the center of the lake there is a stage to give way, in the summer, to represent singing and various shows or film screenings.

On April 5, 2008, the Park of Via Nicolardi was opened, smaller than the Parco del Poggio, with a skating rink and nature trail. The contiguous Vallone di San Rocco, although not easily accessible to the public, is protected as a green lung and included in the urban reserve of the Neapolitan hills.

Not far from the neighborhood there are the Park of Capodimonte, with the historic Bourbon palace and the Museum of Capodimonte, as well as the large and wild Camaldoli Park.

== See also ==
- Quarters of Naples
