= Tribunale station =

Metro station in Naples

Tribunale
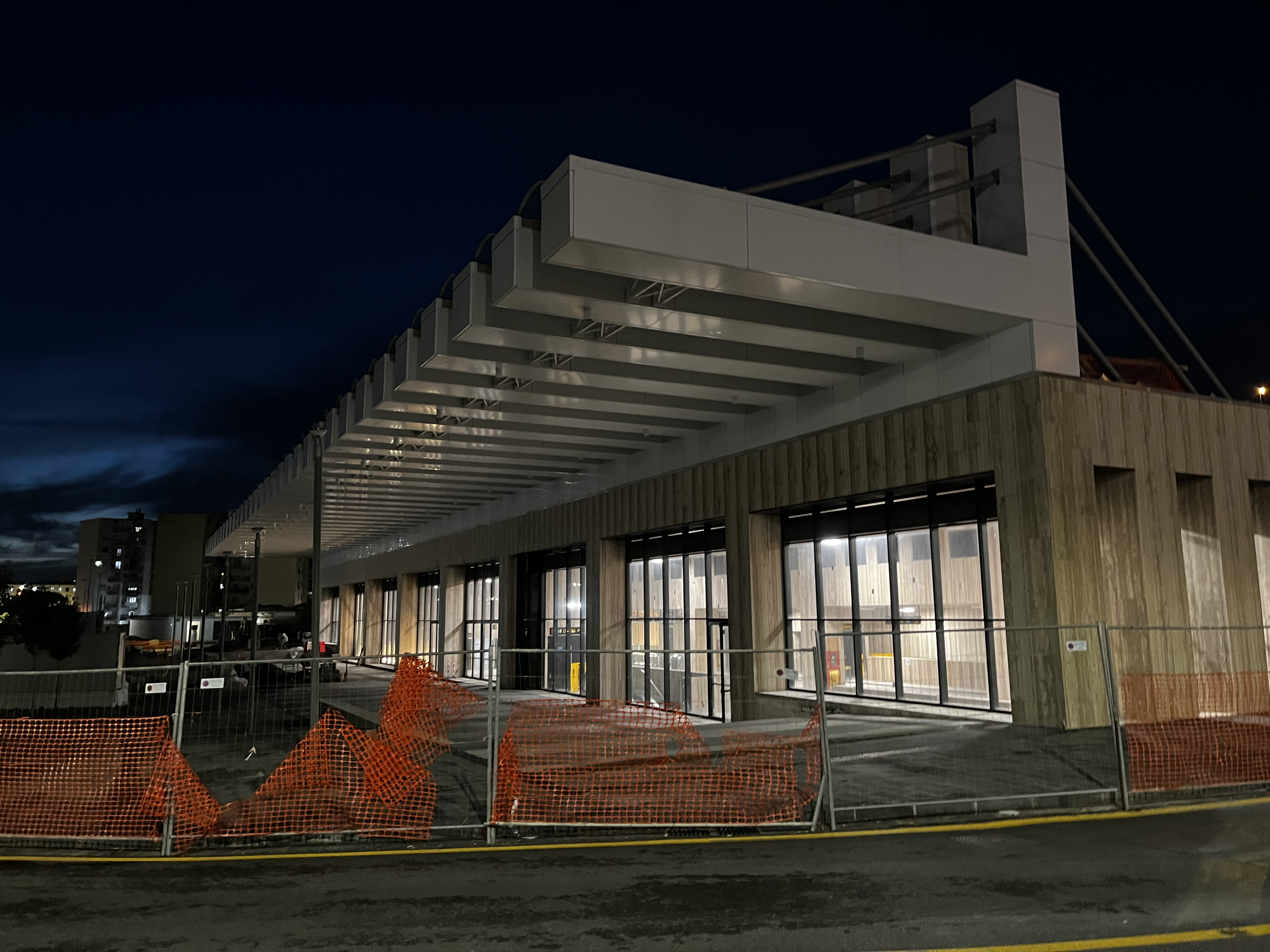
- The station building in 2025, after the works were completed.

General information
- Coordinates: 40.8625°N 14.2841°E
- System: Naples Metro station
- Owner: City of Naples
- Operator: ANM
- Line: Line 1
- Connections: Urban and suburban buses

Construction
- Architect: Mario Botta

Other information
- Status: Under construction

Services
Preceding station	Naples Metro	Following station
Centro Direzionale towards Piscinola Scampia	Line 1	Terminus
Route map
Location

Tribunale is a Naples Metro station on Line 1 rising in Via Domenico Aulisio. The previous station is Centro Direzionale. It is currently closed to the public as it is undergoing testing.

== History ==
The construction site was inaugurated on June 30, 2016. Upon completion of the works, in October 2025, technical tests and inspections were launched under the supervision of ANSFISA, the agency of the Italian Ministry of Transport.

== Station layout ==
The station, designed by Swiss architect Mario Botta, is located on Via Domenico Aulisio, in the Poggioreale district, adjacent to the Naples Courthouse (Palazzo di Giustizia), from which it takes its name, Tribunale.

It is developed on two main levels: the ticket hall level and the platform level. The first, located at street level, is characterized by a completely above-ground structure whose roof consists of lenticular pavilions supported by a large portico. Its walls—except for the one facing north toward the surrounding buildings—feature large glass surfaces and entrances.

The platform level, situated about 8 metres (26 ft) below ground, houses three tracks (as it was originally designed to serve as the terminus of Line 11) and two platforms: one side platform serving the even-numbered track and one island platform serving both the odd-numbered track and the short-run services.

The station is also notable for its elongated shape, extending for approximately 200 metres (660 ft) along the railway line.

== Interchanges ==
The station has:

- Passing bus and tram stop
