= Centro Direzionale station =

Metro station in Naples

Centro Direzionale
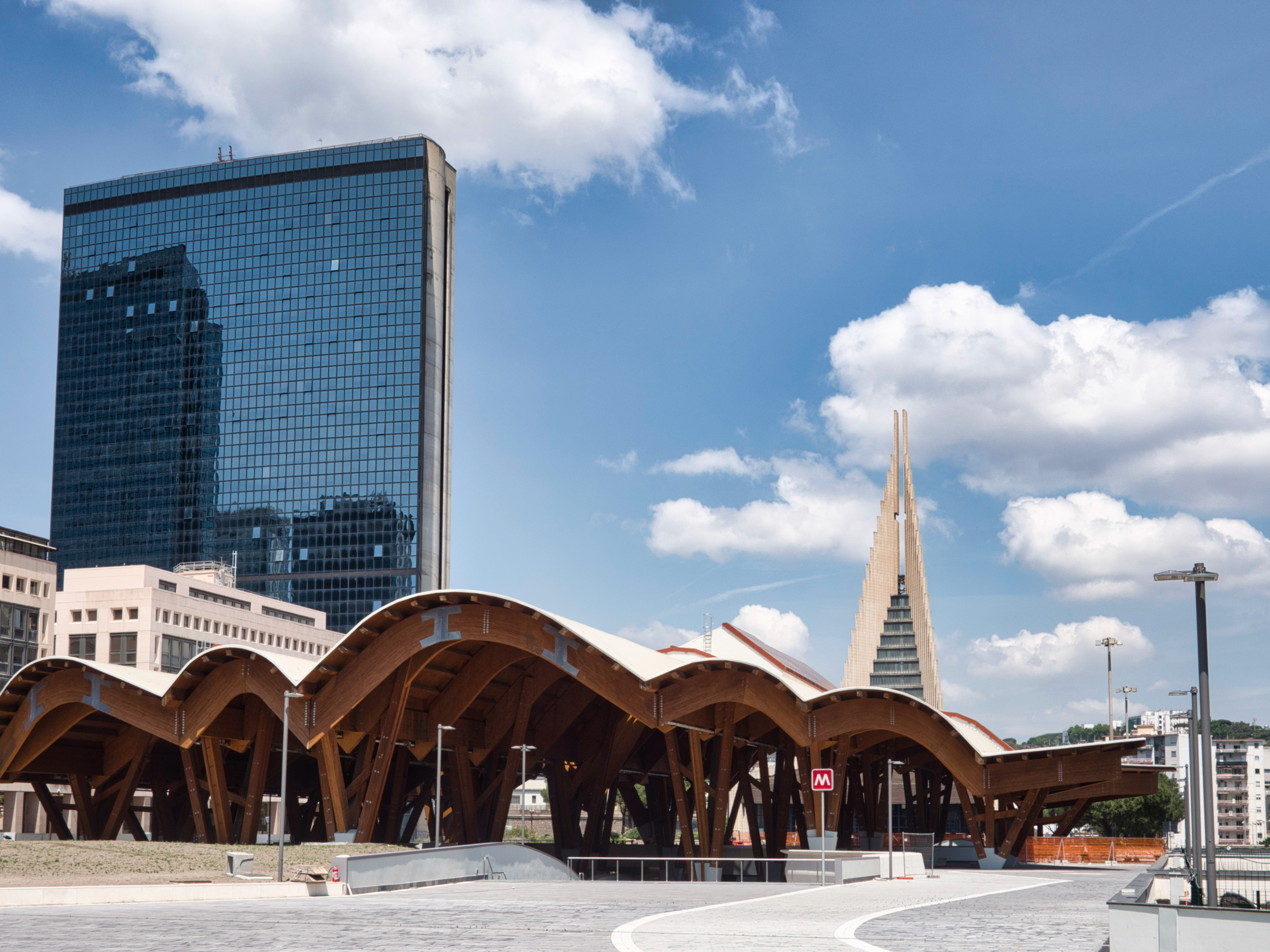
- The entrance of the station.

General information
- Coordinates: 40.8583°N 14.2817°E
- System: Naples Metro station
- Owner: City of Naples
- Operator: ANM
- Line: Line 1
- Connections: Napoli Centro Direzionale railway station (Circumvesuviana) (Note: As of May 2025, the station is closed for renovation. It is expected to reopen in 2027)

Construction
- Architect: Benedetta Tagliabue

History
- Opened: 1 April 2025

Services
Preceding station	Naples Metro	Following station
Garibaldi towards Piscinola Scampia	Line 1	Terminus
Route map
Location

Centro Direzionale is a Naples Metro station on line 1, adjacent and connected through an underground passage to the Napoli Centro Direzionale station of the Circumvesuviana railway.

== History ==
The construction site was inaugurated on 2 August 2014. It opened on 1 April 2025.

== Station layout ==
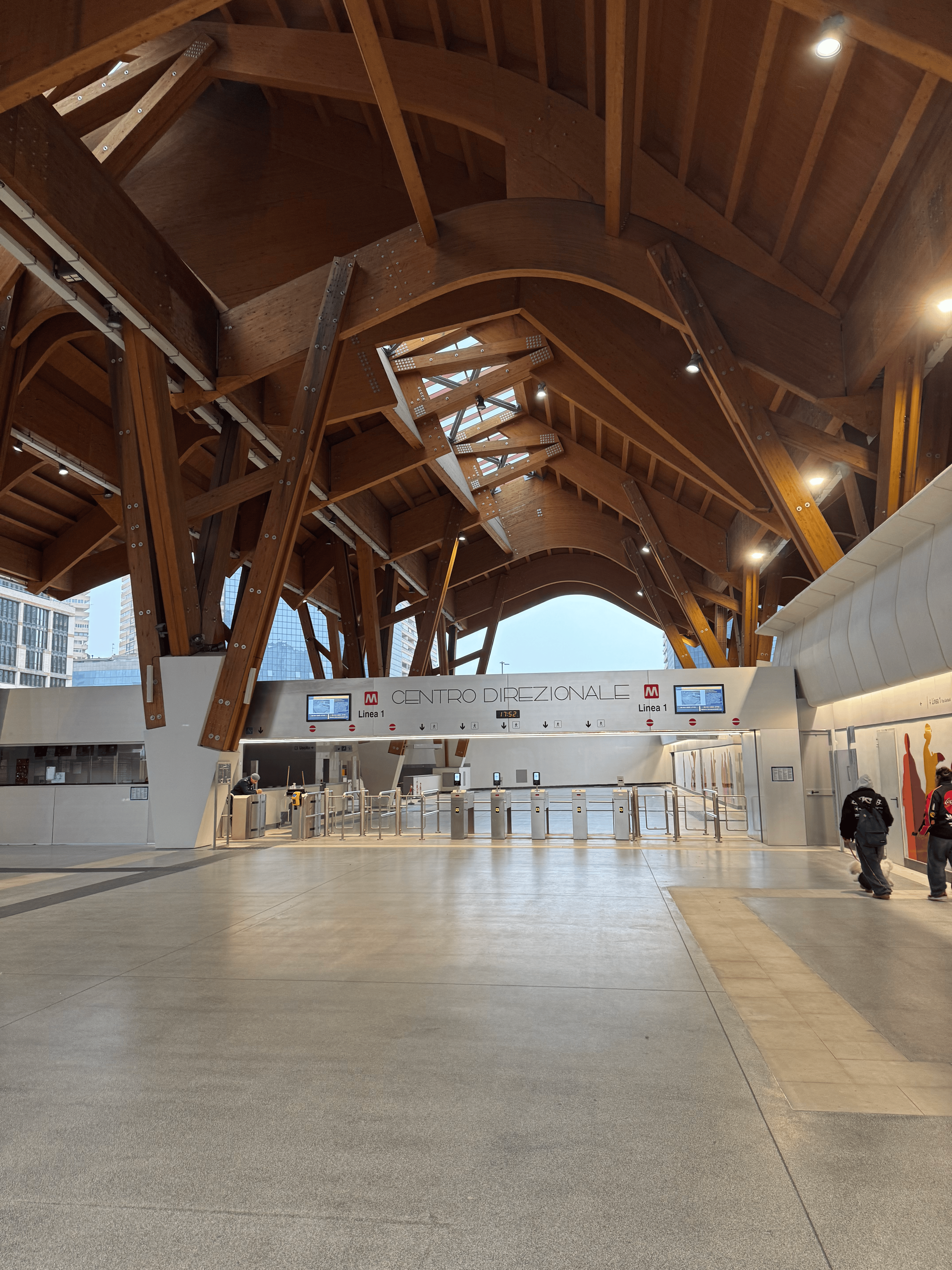
Station concourse

The station, designed by the EMBT studio founded by architects Enric Miralles and Benedetta Tagliabue, serves the Centro direzionale di Napoli, Naples’ business district, home to numerous public offices. The exterior part of the railway complex occupies a central area of Isola F and features a wave-shaped canopy made of laminated wood. This structure, inspired by the underground vaults of the Piscina Mirabilis, recalls organic forms and creates large shaded areas in the square above. Originally, the canopy was to be enriched with a reproduction of the face of Virgil by street artist Jorge Rodríguez-Gerada, visible from above from all the surrounding buildings—an idea later discarded. The canopy covers the entrance hall, which also connects to the Circumvesuviana station, thus forming a large covered square. The station's flooring is made of calcium sulfate panels coated with plastic laminate.

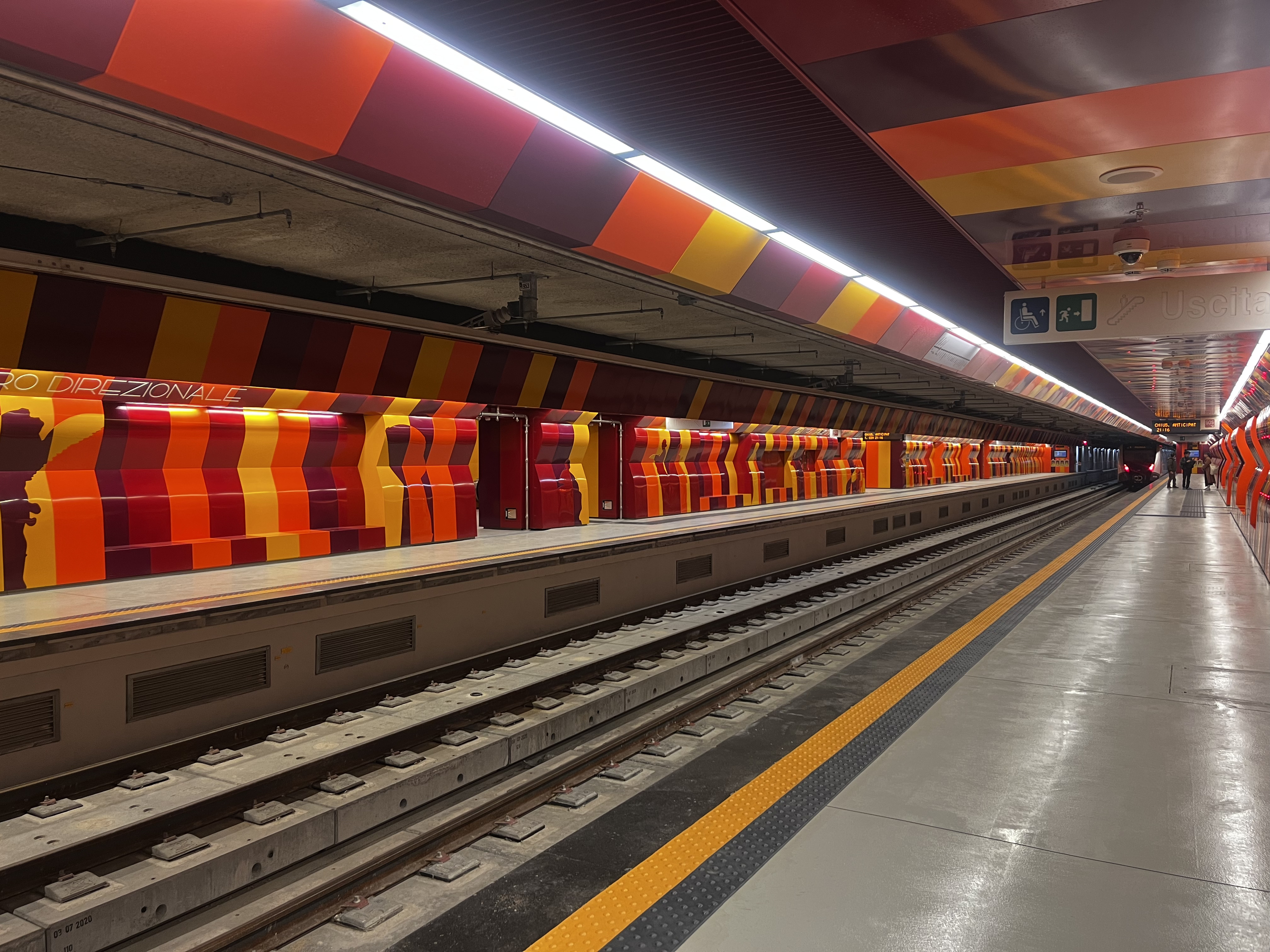
Platform level.

The platform level is located just 12 metres (39 ft) below ground, making the station one of the shallowest on the entire line 1. Architecturally, it stands out for its use of metallic cladding on the walls and ceilings, decorated in the four vibrant colors typical of frescoes found in ancient Pompeian homes, as seen in the archaeological site of Pompeii. Further evoking the archaeological context are the stylized silhouettes adorning the station's walls, inspired by the figures depicted in the Villa of the Mysteries.

The total cost of the structure amounted to approximately 43 million euros. The railway track is owned by the Municipality of Naples, while the station itself is the first on Line 1 to be owned by the Campania Regional Government, although it remains under municipal jurisdiction.

== Interchanges ==
The station has:

- Bus stop
- Railway (Napoli Centro Direzionale, Circumvesuviana)
