= List of Naples Metro stations =

All Naples Metro stations

Naples metro map – only Lines 1, 6 and 11.

The Naples Metro is a metro system in Italy that serves Naples metropolitan area and the province of Caserta. Its first section opened in 1993.

The system is composed of 3 lines – Line 1, Line 6 and Line 11 – serving 30 stations. Instead, Line 2 is a commuter railway, Lines 3, 4, 12, 13, 14 and 15 are part of the Circumvesuviana, while Lines 5, 7 and 8 are part of Cumana and Circumflegrea, not metro systems but metropolitan commuter railway services.

== Stations ==
Station	Photograph	Line(s)	Quarter	Opened	Grade
Arco Mirelli		Line 6	San Ferdinando	16 July 2024	underground
Augusto		Line 6	Fuorigrotta	4 February 2007	underground
Aversa Centro		Line 11	Comune of Aversa	24 April 2009	underground
Aversa Ippodromo		Line 11	Comune of Aversa	24 April 2009	underground
Chiaia-Monte di Dio		Line 6	San Ferdinando	16 July 2024	underground
Centro Direzionale		Line 1	Poggioreale (Centro direzionale di Napoli)	1 April 2025	underground
Chiaiano-Marianella		Line 1	Chiaiano	19 July 1995	viaduct
Colli Aminei		Line 1	Stella	28 May 1993	trench
Dante		Line 1	San Giuseppe	27 March 2002	underground
Duomo		Line 1	Porto	6 August 2021	underground
Frullone-San Rocco		Line 1	Chiaiano	19 July 1995	viaduct
Garibaldi		Line 1	Pendino	31 December 2013	underground
Giugliano		Line 11	Comune of Giugliano	24 April 2009	underground
Lala		Line 6	Fuorigrotta	4 February 2007	underground
Materdei		Line 1	Avvocata	5 July 2001	underground
Medaglie d'Oro		Line 1	Arenella	28 May 1993	underground
Mergellina		Line 6	Mergellina	4 February 2007	underground
Montedonzelli		Line 1	Arenella	28 May 1993	underground
Mostra		Line 6	Fuorigrotta	4 February 2007	underground
Mugnano		Line 11	Comune of Mugnano	16 July 2005	underground
Municipio		Line 1 Line 6	San Ferdinando	23 May 2015 (Line 1) - 16 July 2024 (Line 6)	underground
Museo		Line 1	Stella	5 April 2001	underground
Piscinola Scampia		Line 1 Line 11	Piscinola; Scampia	19 July 1995 (Line 1) - 16 July 2005 (Line 11)	viaduct (Line 1) underground (Line 11)
Policlinico		Line 1	Stella	28 May 1993	underground
Quattro Giornate		Line 1	Vomero	5 April 2001	underground
Rione Alto		Line 1	Arenella	28 May 1993	underground
Salvator Rosa		Line 1	Arenella	5 April 2001	underground
San Pasquale		Line 6	San Ferdinando	16 July 2024	underground
Toledo		Line 1	Quartieri Spagnoli	17 April 2012	underground
Università		Line 1	Porto	26 March 2011	underground
Vanvitelli		Line 1	Vomero	28 May 1993	underground
