= Melito station =

Metro station in Melito di Napoli, Campania, Italy

Melito

General information
- Location: Melito di Napoli, Metropolitan City of Naples, Campania
- System: Naples Metro station
- Operator: EAV
- Manager: Naples Metro
- Line: Line 11
- Tracks: 2

Construction
- Structure type: In use

Services
Preceding station	Naples Metro	Following station
Mugnano towards Piscinola Scampia	Line 11	Giugliano towards Aversa Centro
Location

Melito is an underground metro station under construction that will serve Line 11 on the Naples Metro.

The previous station is Mugnano, the next one is Giugliano.

== History ==
Designed in the early 2000s, the station's construction has been interrupted multiple times.

The station will feature four commercial spaces, including a bar and a newsstand.

As of July 2021, the construction of the platforms is complete. Work continues on the turnstile level and the upper area.

== Station building ==
It is located in the town of Melito di Napoli on Via delle Margherite 4, and its distinguishing color is indigo. It stands very close (670 metres (2,200 ft)) to Giugliano station.

== See also ==
- List of Naples Metro stations
