= Giugliano station =

Metro station in Giugliano, Campania, Italy

Giugliano
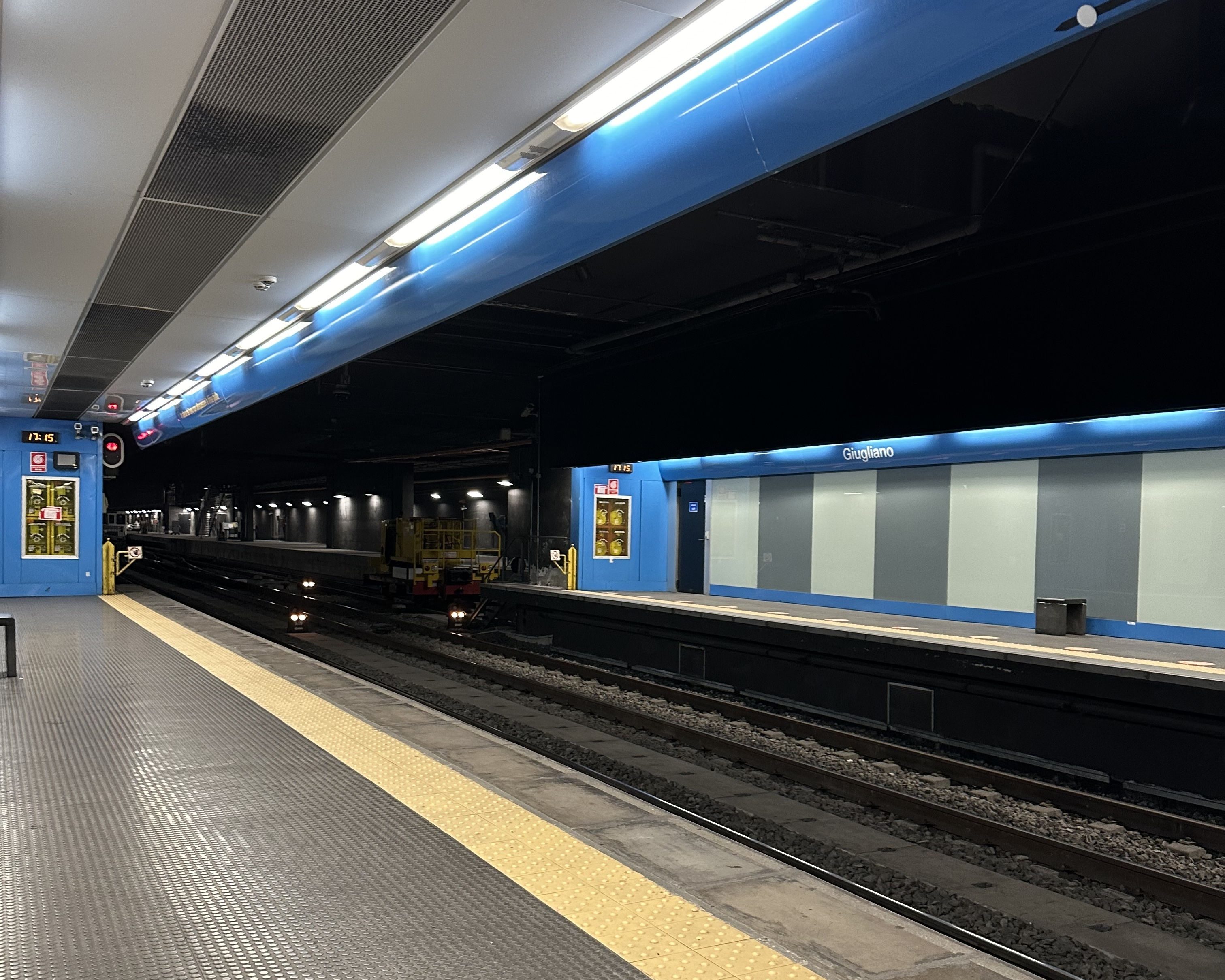
- Platform

General information
- Location: Via Colonne, Giugliano 80014, Metropolitan City of Naples
- Coordinates: 40.9278000°N 14.2176000°E
- System: Naples Metro station
- Operator: EAV
- Manager: Naples Metro
- Line: Line 11
- Tracks: 2
- Connections: Urban buses

Construction
- Structure type: Underground

History
- Opened: April 24, 2009

Services
Preceding station	Naples Metro	Following station
Mugnano towards Piscinola Scampia	Line 11	Aversa Ippodromo towards Aversa Centro
Location

Giugliano is a Naples Metro underground station that serves Line 11. The previous station is Mugnano, the next one is Aversa Ippodromo.

== History ==
Construction works on the section including Giugliano station first began in the 1980s, but the project was subsequently abandoned for a long period before officially resuming on 20 May 2003. The construction of the station required the demolition of three illegally constructed residential buildings on public land on Via Rocco Scotellaro, the last of which was demolished in 2004.

The station was subsequently designed in 2006 by architect Sandro Raffone and was finally opened on 24 April 2009 together with the Mugnano–Aversa Centro section.

== Station building ==
The facility is located in the Colonne di Giugliano area, not far from the so-called GESCAL neighborhood, in a location close to where the corresponding branch station of the Naples-Aversa/Giugliano tram line was situated from 1882 to 1959. The station is approximately 112 meters long and features several artistic installations inside.

In 2021, a mural depicting the eyes of Giambattista Basile was created on the station's roof.

The station is one of the busiest on the line, as it is located right on the border with the densely populated municipalities of Sant'Antimo and Melito, with the under-construction station in Melito just a few hundred meters away.

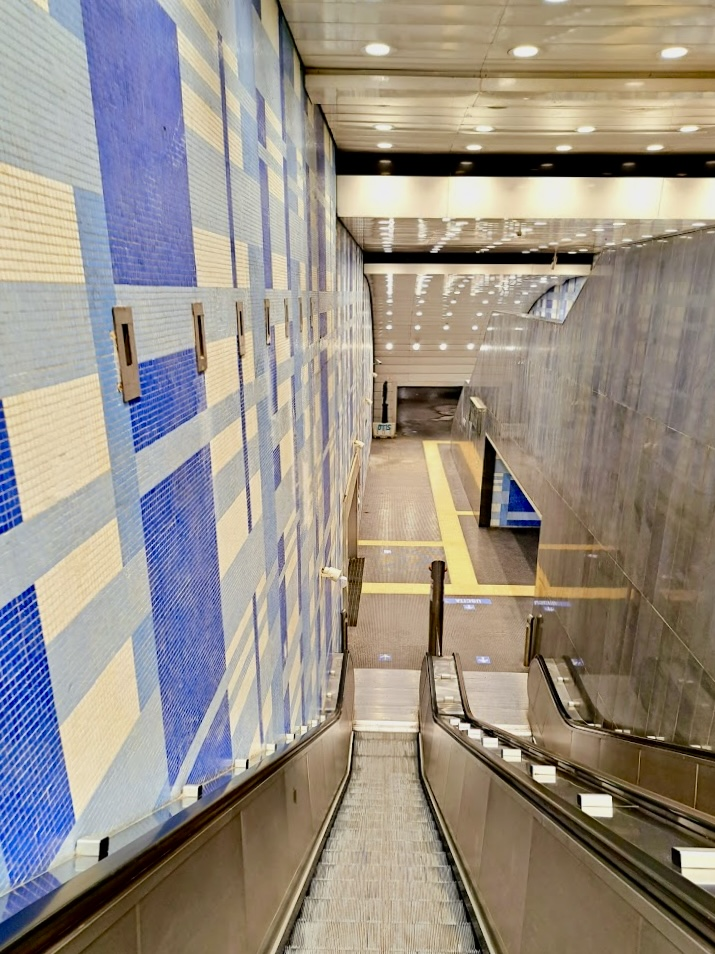
Escalators

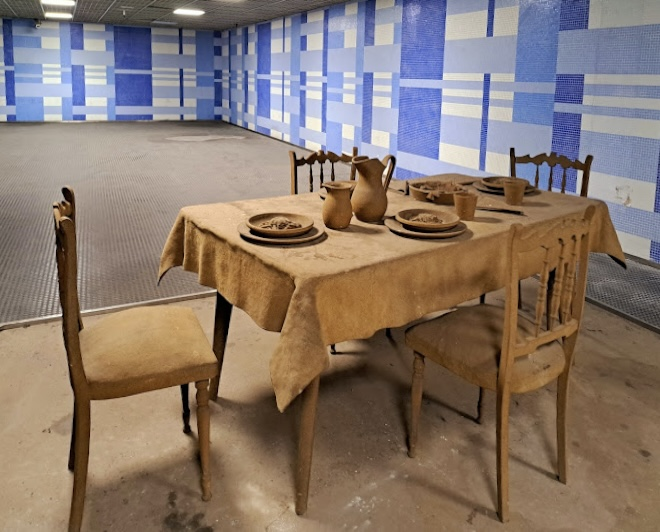
Art installation inside the station

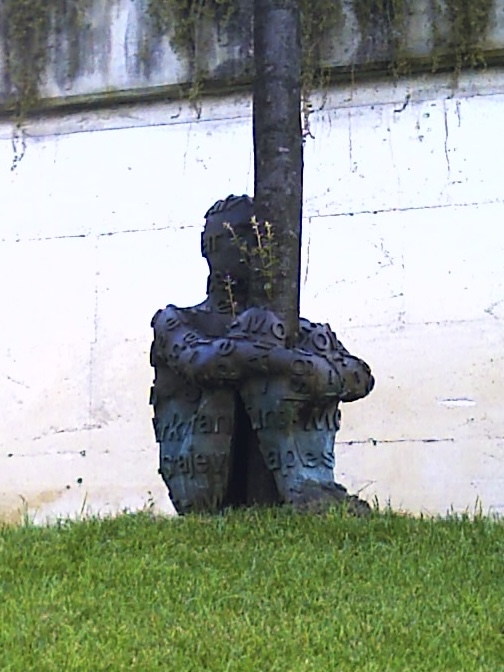
Art installation outside the station

== See also ==
- List of Naples Metro stations
