= Aversa Ippodromo station =

Metro station in Aversa, Campania, Italy

Coordinates: 40.9608°N 14.2108°E

Aversa Ippodromo
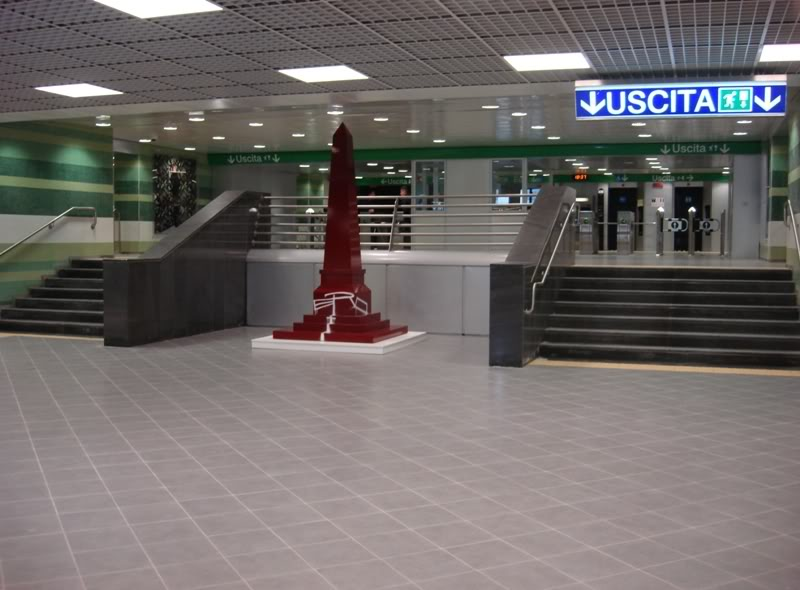
- Hall

General information
- Location: Aversa, Campania
- System: Naples Metro station
- Operator: EAV
- Manager: Naples Metro
- Line: Line 11
- Tracks: 2
- Connections: Urban buses

Construction
- Structure type: In use

History
- Opened: April 24, 2009

Services
Preceding station	Naples Metro	Following station
Giugliano towards Piscinola Scampia	Line 11	Aversa Centro Terminus
Location

Aversa Ippodromo is an underground metro station that serves Line 11 on the Naples Metro.

The previous station is Giugliano, the next is Aversa Centro.

== History ==
The station opened in April 2009. The distinguishing color is green.

== Station building ==
Inside, there are several artistic installations, including a red obelisk in the center of the station hall.

== See also ==
- List of Naples Metro stations
