= Naples War Cemetery =

War Cemetery

Coordinates: 40.8849°N 14.2401°E

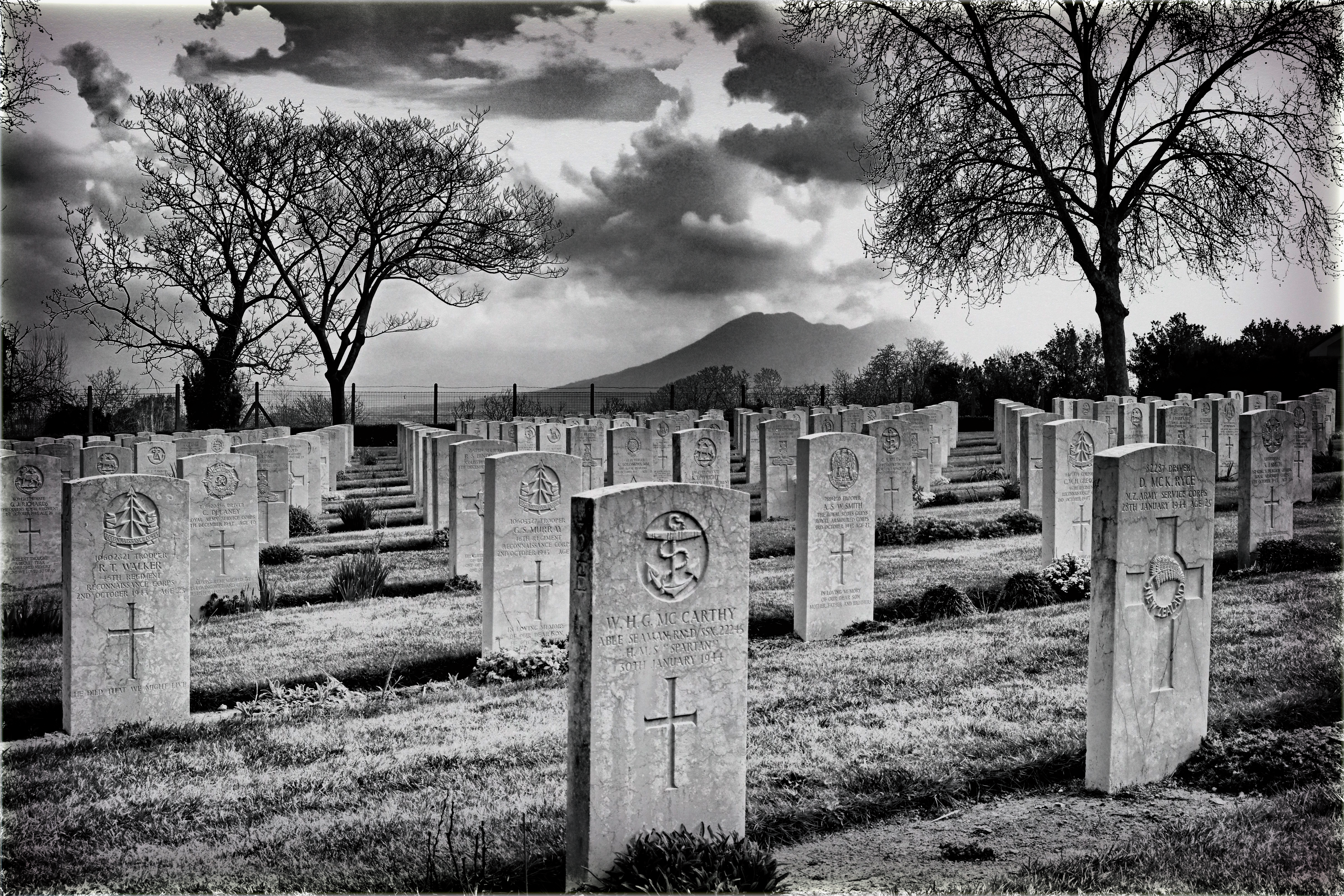
- Naples War Cemetery with Mount Vesuvius in the background
- Interactive map of Naples War Cemetery

Details
- Established: 1943
- Location: Naples
- Country: Italy
- Type: Military
- Owned by: Commonwealth War Graves Commission
- Size: 1.47 hectares
- No. of graves: 1,202

The Naples War Cemetery, also known as the Commonwealth War Cemetery (Italian: Cimitero militare di Napoli or Cimitero di guerra del Commonwealth), is a war memorial containing the graves of servicemen of the Commonwealth of Nations who died in Naples, Italy during World War II.

Established in 1943, it is located in the Miano district, at Via Vincenzo Janfolla 364, and is visited each year by thousands of visitors from around the world.

== History and description ==
From late 1943 until the end of the conflict, the 65th and 92nd General Hospitals were stationed in Naples, and for much of that period the 67th General Hospital was also present. The site for the war cemetery was selected in November 1943, and servicemen who died in the hospitals and the garrison were buried there. Later, graves from smaller cemeteries in the surrounding area were concentrated in this site.

The cemetery contains 1,190 identified burials of servicemen from Commonwealth countries, including Australia, New Zealand, Canada, South Africa, the United Kingdom, and India, among others. There are also a small number of non-war graves and burials of other nationalities, including one Russian and one Norwegian soldier, bringing the total to 1,202. Most of the dead were under 30 years old.

The cemetery lies south of Piscinola, on a green plateau overlooking the Vallone Boscariello, and covers 14,723 square metres, making it one of the largest in Italy. To the north of Via Janfolla are residential areas and private developments. The layout follows a typical Anglo-Saxon style, divided into four burial plots with uniform stone headstones bearing inscriptions, regimental badges, and short commemorative phrases.

The site is not enclosed by walls or fences, but is bordered by a line of trees, interrupted only by the entrance gate. A marble wall at the entrance bears the inscription Naples War Cemetery 1939–1945. On its inner face is the inscription: "The land on which this cemetery stands is the gift of the Italian people for the perpetual resting place of the sailors, soldiers and airmen who are honoured here".

The cemetery can be reached via Naples Metro Line 1, served by the Frullone-San Rocco station.
