= Materdei station =

Metro station in Naples

Coordinates: 40.8557°N 14.2433°E

Materdei
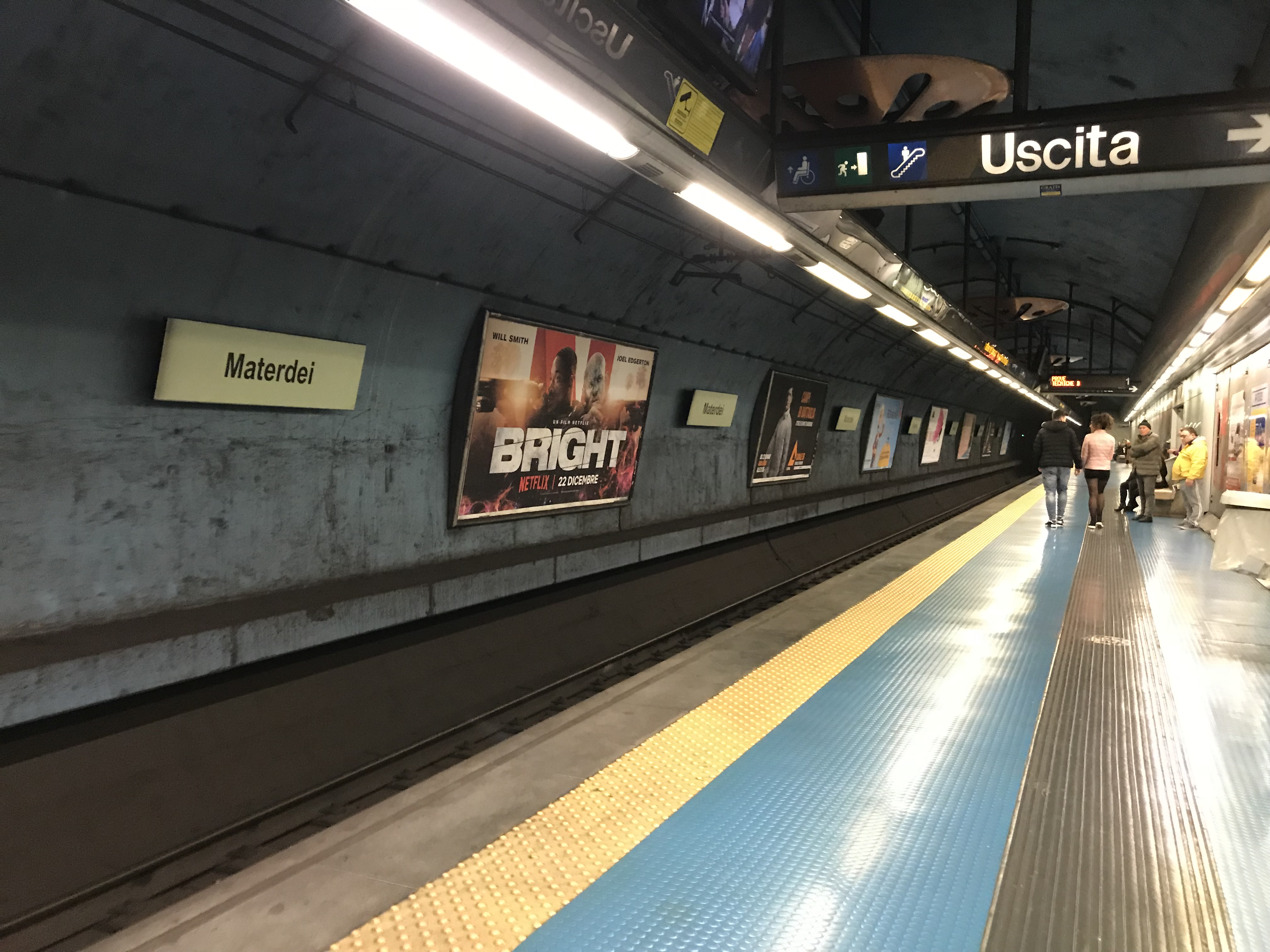

General information
- System: Naples Metro station
- Operator: ANM
- Line: Line 1

History
- Opened: 5 July 2003

Services
Preceding station	Naples Metro	Following station
Salvator Rosa towards Piscinola Scampia	Line 1	Museo towards Centro Direzionale
Route map
Location

Materdei is a Naples Metro station that serves Line 1, located in Piazza Scipione Ammirato. According to the British newspaper The Daily Telegraph it was ranked in 16th place as the most beautiful metro station in Europe.

== Station layout ==
The station was designed by Alessandro Mendini and inaugurated on 5 July 2003 in the presence of the fifteen transport ministers of the European Union nations.

Its opening took place two years after the completion of the entire section up to Dante as it was used as an extraction well for the surface recovery of the materials and machinery used during the excavations.

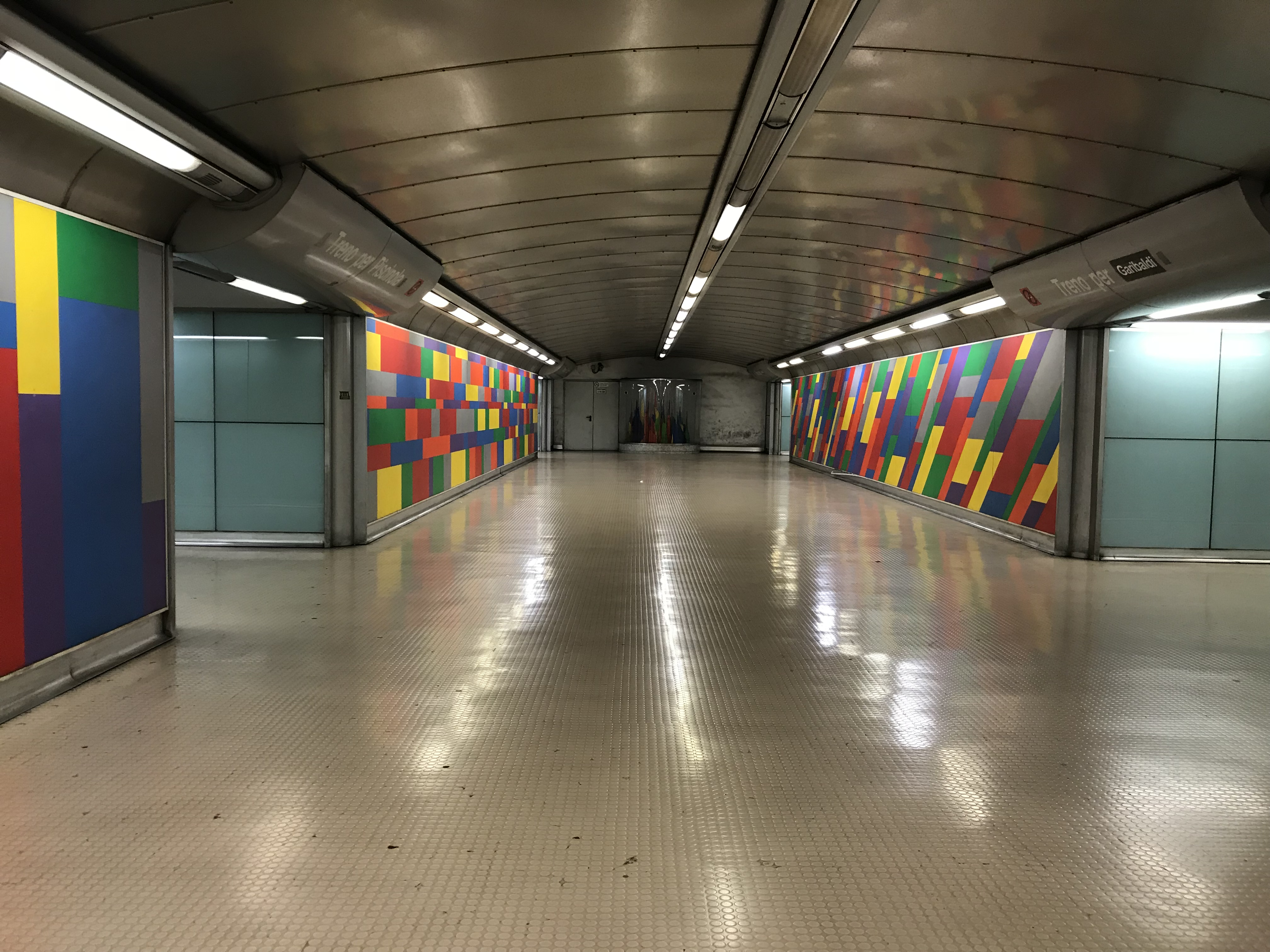
The station of Materdei.

Inside the airport, which is part of the circuit of art stations, there is a mosaic by Sandro Chia, a high-relief by Luigi Ontani and works by Sol LeWitt and serigraphs by lesser-known artists. A detail of the station is the glass spire that overlooks the mosaic and was also designed by Mendini, also the author of the urban redevelopment of the area surrounding the station, which involved the pedestrianization of part of Piazza Ammirato and Via Leone Marsicano and the consequent substantial variation of the viability in the area.

The station, unlike all the others, is not located in a main road, but is located in the Materdei district, a short distance from the Arenella district and the Sanità district.

== Services ==
The station has:

- Automatic ticket office

== Connections ==
The Materdei station, as previously mentioned, is located in a neighborhood street and therefore is the only station on line 1 that does not have surface interchanges. Until 2016 an ANM shuttle line called C53 was active, connecting the square outside the station with Piazza Museo Nazionale and the Fontanelle Cemetery. This line, given the low turnout, was first limited with morning runs on weekdays and subsequently completely suppressed; to make up for the lack, a second exit was idealized in 2016 and designed in 2018 at the base of the stairway in via Telesino (near the aforementioned cemetery).
