= Metro Toledo =

Metro Toledo can refer to:

- Toledo metropolitan area, a metropolitan area centered on the American city of Toledo, Ohio
- Toledo (Naples Metro), a station on Line 1 of the Naples Metro
