= Museo =

Museo may refer to:

- Museum (2018 film), Mexican drama heist film
- Museo station, station on line 1 of the Naples Metro
