= Quattro Giornate station =

Naples Metro station

Coordinates: 40°50′46″N 14°13′31″E

Quattro Giornate
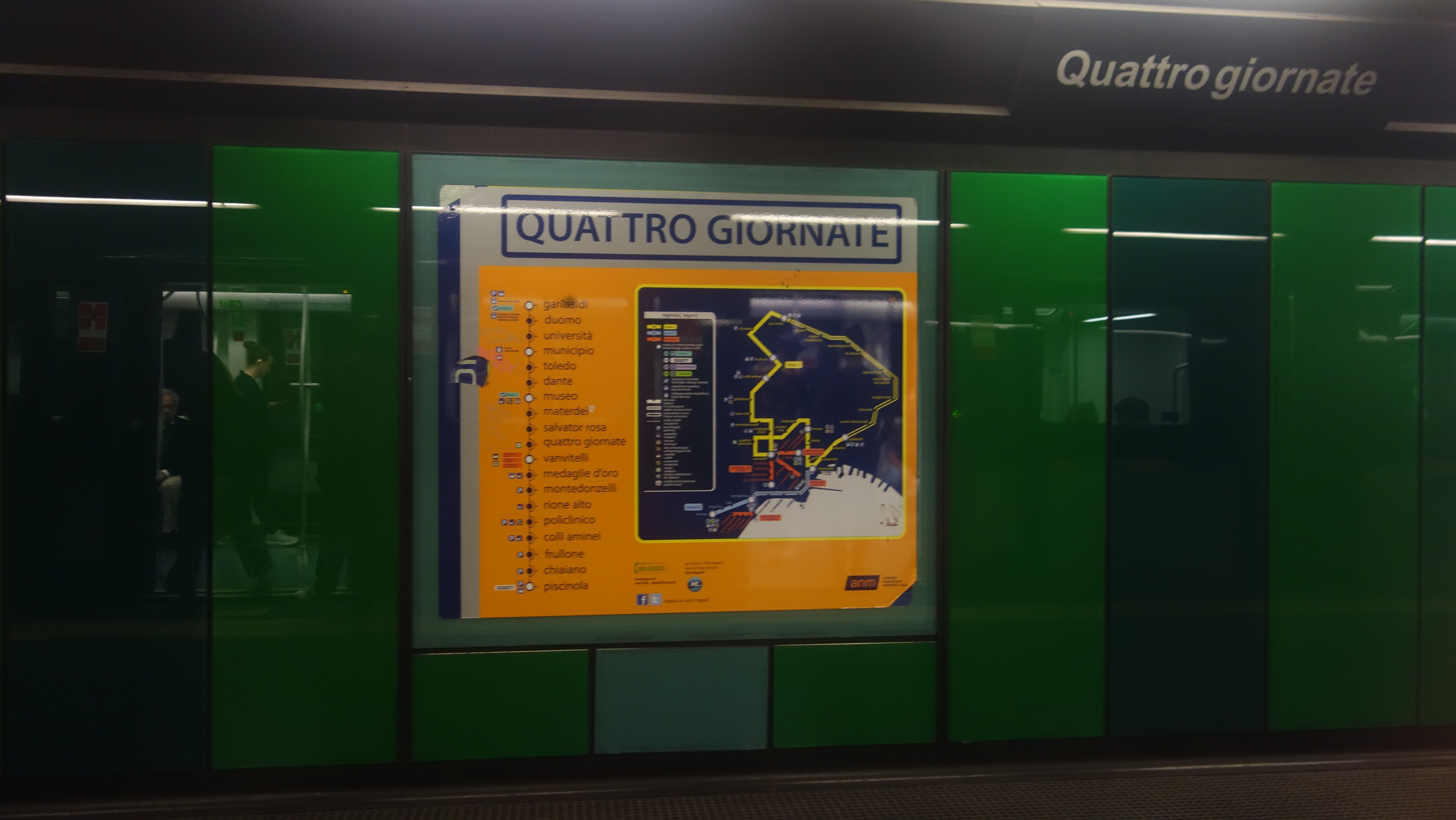

General information
- System: Naples Metro station
- Operator: ANM
- Line: Line 1

History
- Opened: 5 April 2001

Services
Preceding station	Naples Metro	Following station
Vanvitelli towards Piscinola Scampia	Line 1	Salvator Rosa towards Centro Direzionale
Route map
Location

Quattro Giornate is a Naples Metro station that serves line 1. It opened on 5 April 2001 as part of the section the line between Vanvitelli and Museo. The station is located between Vanvitelli and Salvator Rosa.
