= Salvator Rosa station =

Naples Metro station

Coordinates: 40°51′04″N 14°14′12″E

Salvator Rosa
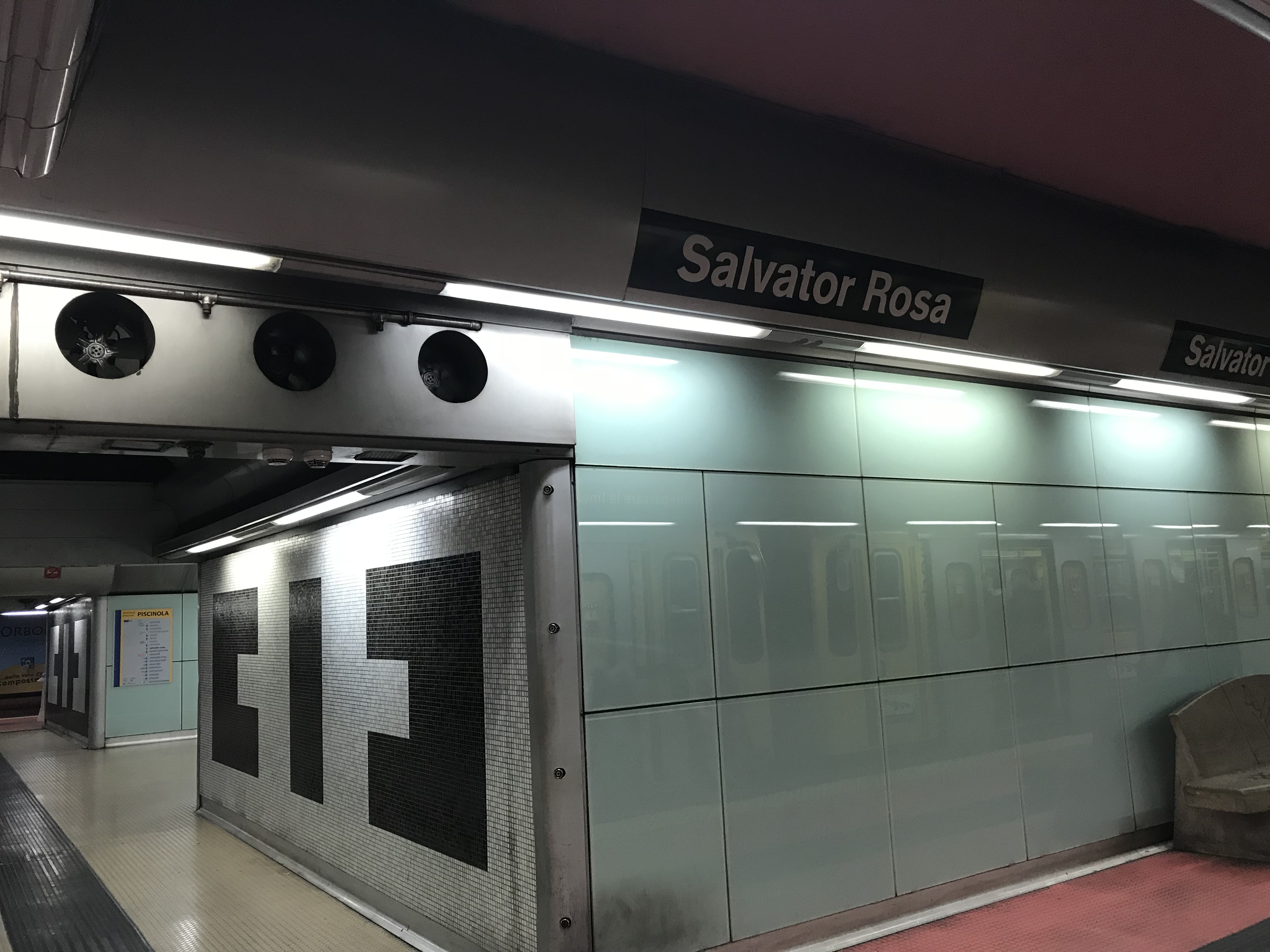
- Salvator Rosa

General information
- System: Naples Metro station
- Operator: ANM
- Line: Line 1

History
- Opened: 5 April 2001

Services
Preceding station	Naples Metro	Following station
Quattro Giornate towards Piscinola Scampia	Line 1	Materdei towards Centro Direzionale
Route map
Location

Salvator Rosa is a Naples Metro station on Line 1. It opened on 5 April 2001 as part of the section of the line between Vanvitelli and Museo. The station is located between Quattro Giornate and Materdei. Materdei station was added to the line on 5 July 2003, and before that date, the adjacent station was Museo.

The station is named after the neighboring street, Via Salvator Rosa, which in turn is named after the painter Salvator Rosa.
