= Frullone–San Rocco station =

Naples Metro station

Coordinates: 40°52′51″N 14°13′51″E

Frullone–San Rocco
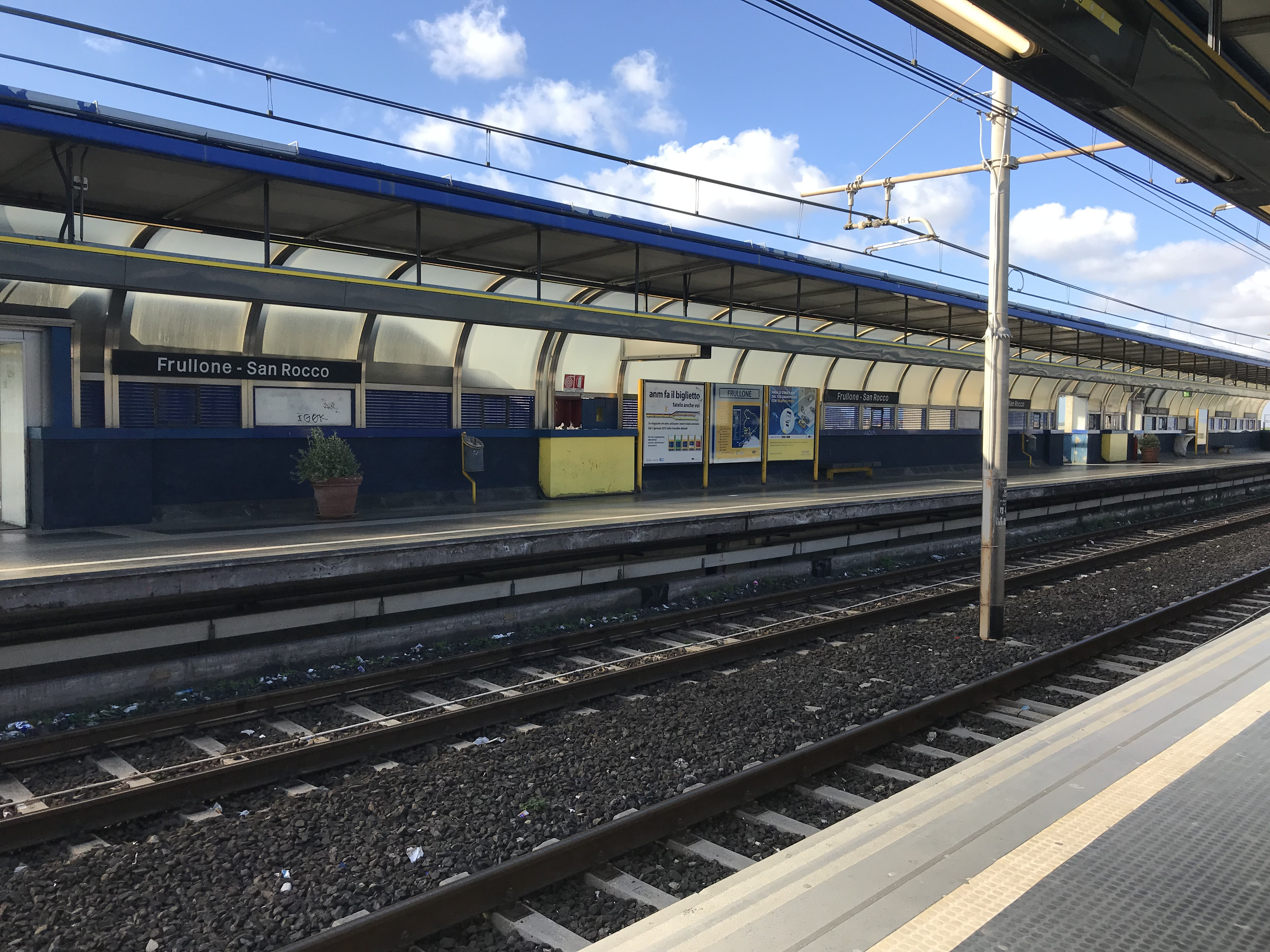
- The platforms

General information
- System: Naples Metro station
- Owner: City of Naples
- Operator: ANM
- Line: Line 1

Construction
- Structure type: Elevated
- Accessible: Yes

History
- Opened: 19 July 1995

Services
Preceding station	Naples Metro	Following station
Chiaiano-Marianella towards Piscinola Scampia	Line 1	Colli Aminei towards Centro Direzionale
Route map
Location

Frullone–San Rocco is a Naples Metro station that serves line 1. It opened on 19 July 1995 as part of the section between Colli Aminei and Piscinola. The station is located between Colli Aminei and Chiaiano-Marianella.

== Station layout ==
The station, located on a viaduct, was inaugurated in 1995 along with the section extending from Colli Aminei to Piscinola-Scampia. The structure is situated between the areas of Frullone and San Rocco, which belong to the districts of Chiaiano and Piscinola.

In 2011, the station was renovated on the occasion of the inauguration of the adjacent park-and-ride facility, which has 600 parking spaces.
