= Chiaiano–Marianella station =

Naples Metro station

Coordinates: 40°53′26″N 14°13′24″E

Chiaiano–Marianella
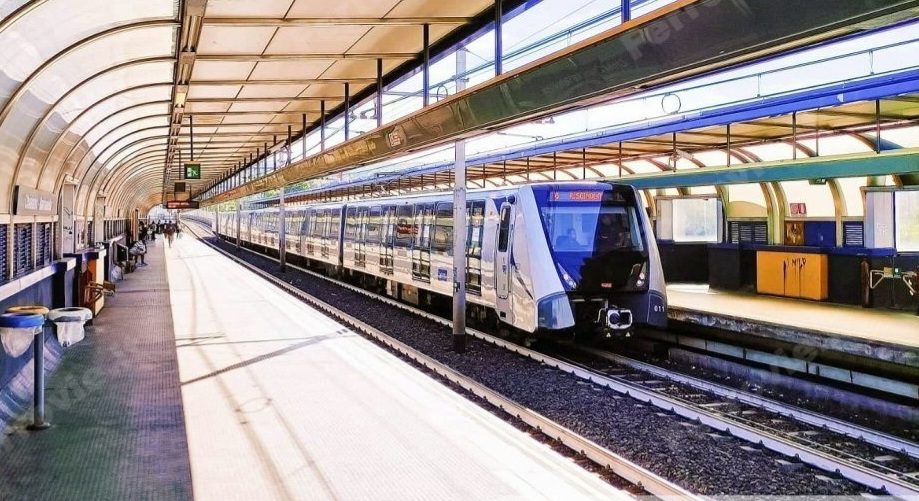
- Chiaiano

General information
- System: Naples Metro station
- Operator: ANM
- Line: Line 1

History
- Opened: 19 July 1995

Services
Preceding station	Naples Metro	Following station
Piscinola Scampia Terminus	Line 1	Frullone-San Rocco towards Centro Direzionale
Location

Chiaiano–Marianella is a station on line 1 of the Naples Metro. It was opened on 19 July 1995 as part of the section between Colli Aminei and Piscinola. The station is located between Frullone and Piscinola.
