= Mugnano station =

Naples Metro station

Coordinates: 40°54′46.8″N 14°13′05.88″E

Mugnano
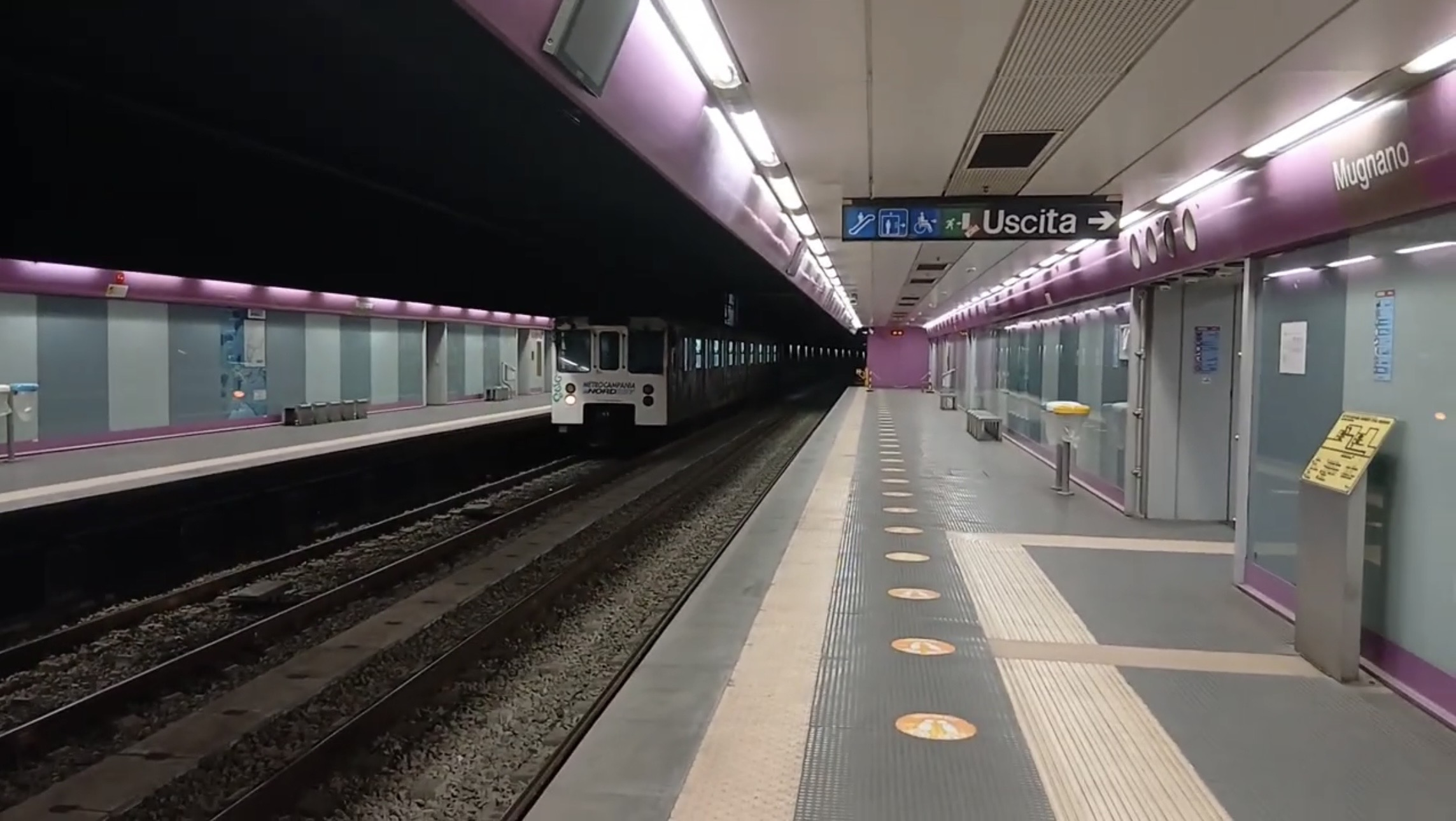

General information
- Location: Via Giovanni Verga, Mugnano di Napoli, Metropolitan City of Naples
- System: Naples Metro station
- Operator: EAV
- Line: Line 11
- Connections: Urban and suburban buses

History
- Opened: 16 July 2005

Services
Preceding station	Naples Metro	Following station
Piscinola Scampia Terminus	Line 11	Giugliano towards Aversa Centro
Location

Mugnano is a Naples Metro station that serves Line 11. It was opened on 16 July 2005 and serves the municipality of Mugnano di Napoli.

The previous station is Piscinola Scampia, and the next is Giugliano.

Located at the intersection of Via Nuova Metropolitana and Via Giovanni Verga, in a suburban area of the municipality of Mugnano di Napoli, it is just a few dozen meters from the Circumvallazione Esterna of Naples. The station is underground, and its distinctive color is purple.

The station also features several artistic installations.

== History ==
It became operational on July 16, 2005, with the inauguration of the section from Piscinola, the current terminus, to Mugnano.

Until April 23, 2009, it served as the terminus of the Mugnano-Piscinola section. The following day, the subsequent stations up to Aversa Centro were inaugurated.

== See also ==
- Railway stations in Italy
- List of Naples metro stations

(*) Planned (**) Under construction
