= Toledo station (Naples) =

Naples Metro station

Toledo
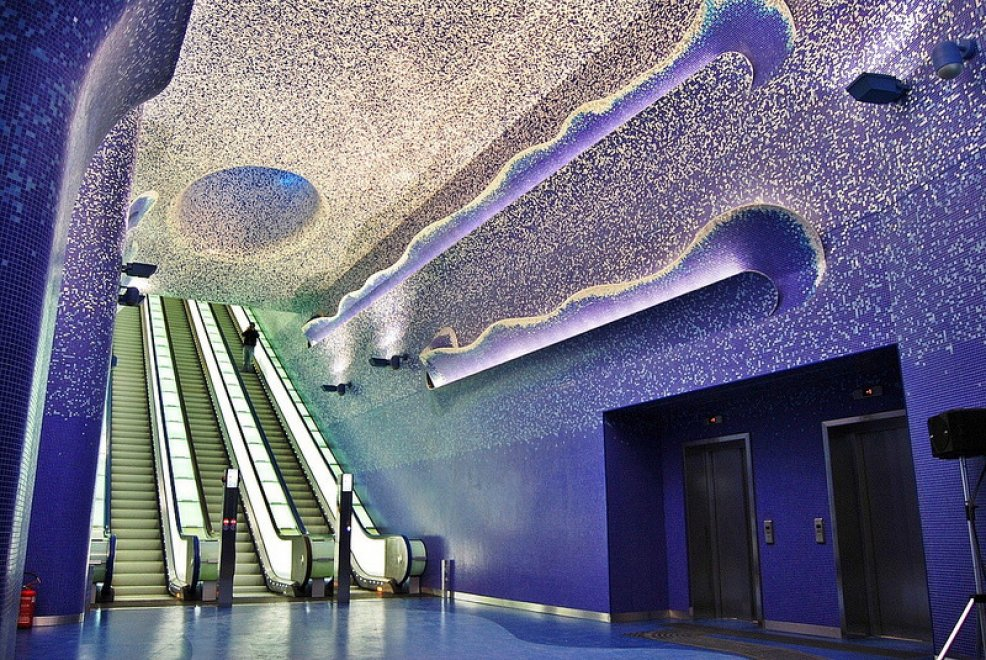
- Escalators leading to the exit. Above, the famous Artwork can be seen.

General information
- Location: Via Toledo, Quartieri Spagnoli, Naples, Campania, Italy
- Coordinates: 40.8425°N 14.2489°E
- System: Naples Metro station
- Owner: City of Naples
- Operator: ANM
- Line: Line 1

Construction
- Structure type: Underground
- Accessible: Yes

History
- Opened: April 17, 2012

Services
Preceding station	Naples Metro	Following station
Dante towards Piscinola Scampia	Line 1	Municipio towards Centro Direzionale
Route map
Location

Toledo is a Naples Metro station located directly on Via Toledo street. It is served by the Line 1. The station was opened on April 17, 2012 on the earlier completed section to Università.

According to the British newspaper The Daily Telegraph, this station is the most beautiful subway station in Europe and the world, a recognition echoed by CNN’s rankings.

In 2013, it won the Emirates LEAF Award as Public Building of the Year. In 2015, it received the International Tunnelling Association Award—known as the "Academy Award of Underground Works"—beating entries from Sydney and Jerusalem.

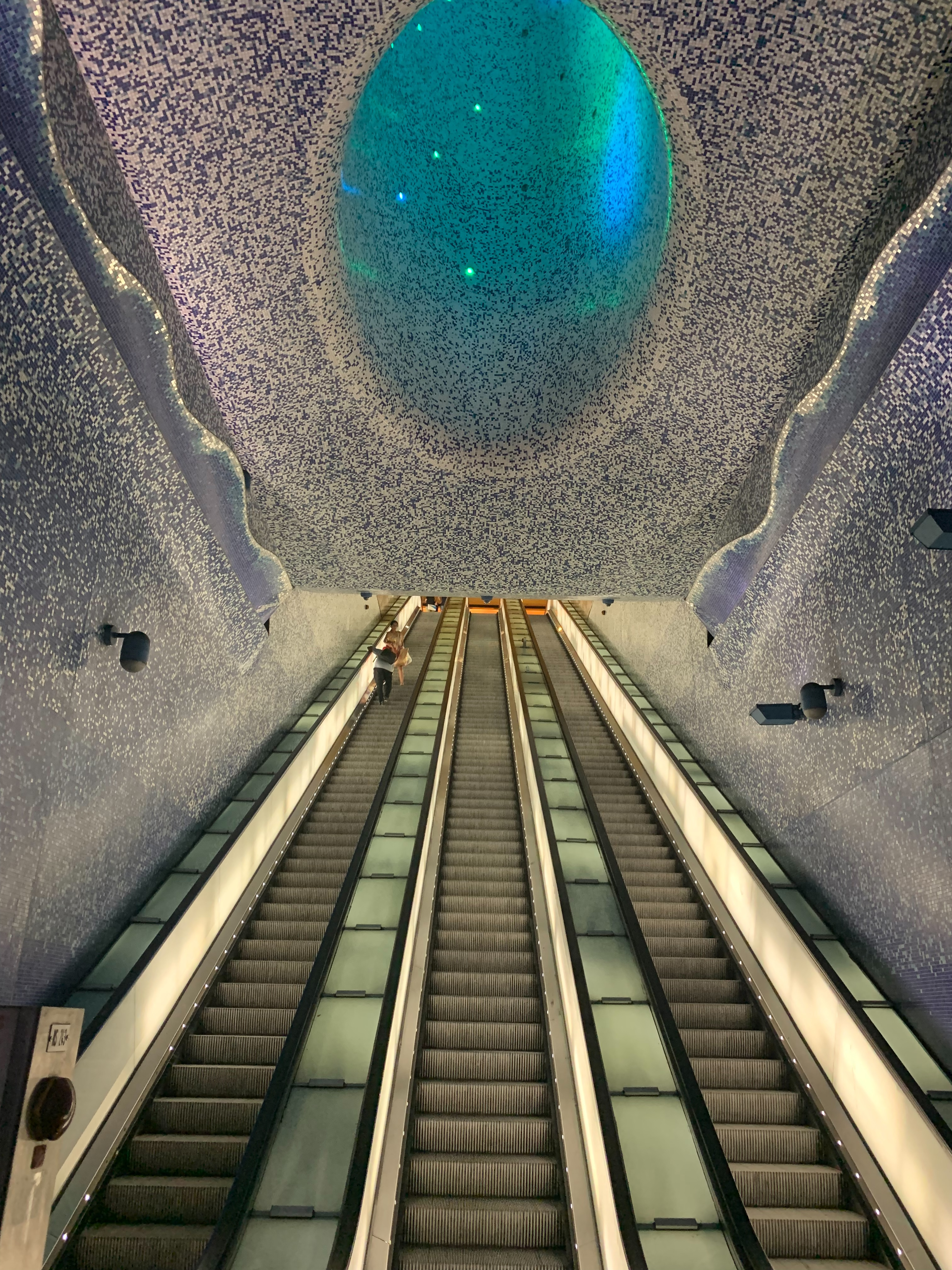
Toledo station.

== History ==
The station was designed by Spanish architect Óscar Tusquets. In the original plan for the line, Toledo station was initially intended to be located in Piazza Carità, while the subsequent station was to be the current Università station. However, following a modification of the route, which included the addition of Municipio station and its planned interchange with the under-construction Line 6, it became necessary to revise the project and relocate the station approximately one hundred meters from its original planned site.

The station features three exits: Via Toledo, with two staircases leading towards Piazza del Plebiscito and Piazza Carità; Via Diaz, equipped with an escalator for ascending passengers and an elevator; and Piazza Montecalvario, connected by a 170-meter gallery that was inaugurated on September 18, 2013.

The delay in the station’s inauguration compared to the original schedule was caused by logistical challenges arising from the presence of an underground aquifer. Consequently, water became the recurring theme of this location, integrated into the broader Art Stations project.

The station was officially presented to the press on April 12, 2012, by Mayor Luigi de Magistris, the President of the Campania Region Stefano Caldoro, and other local authorities. Initially scheduled to open in late June, the station was finally operational on September 17, 2012, due to difficulties in the procurement of materials.

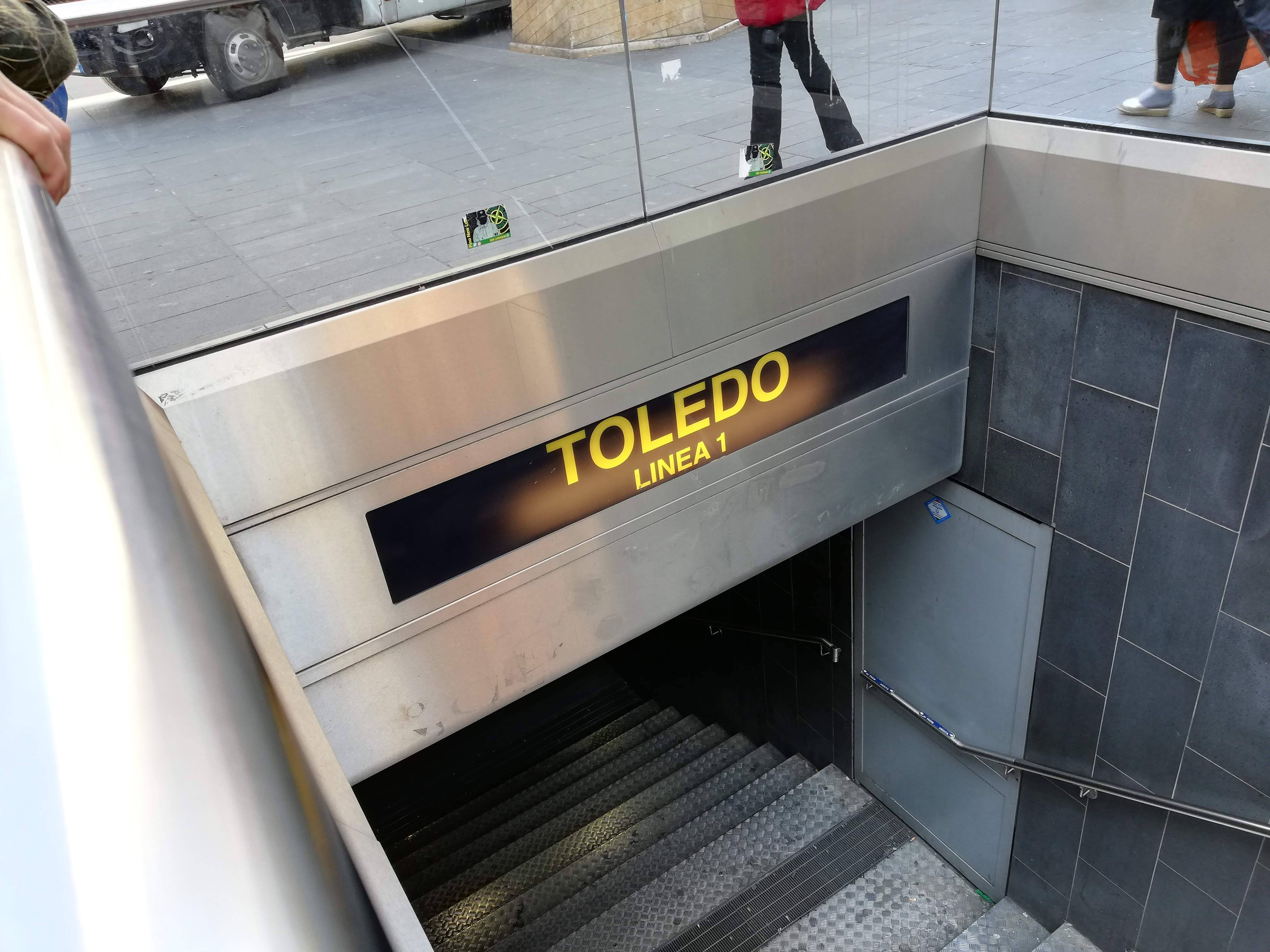
Subway entrance.

== Structures and Artworks ==
Escalators

To enhance the exterior of the station, several areas were converted into fully pedestrian zones: the section of Via Armando Diaz between Via Toledo and Via Oberdan, the portion of Via Toledo in front of the Church of Santa Maria delle Grazie, and the pre-existing intersection between Via Toledo and Via Diaz, which was transformed into a square later dedicated to Enrico Berlinguer. At the entrance on Via Diaz, parallel to Via Toledo, three hexagonal structures clad in blue and ochre tiles serve as skylights for the station’s atrium. The colors of these skylights are significant as they foreshadow the dominant tones within the station.

A short distance along Via Diaz stands an equestrian statue titled Il Cavaliere di Toledo, crafted by artist William Kentridge in weathering steel. The artwork was inaugurated on December 15, 2012, during the White Night event, marking the completion of the street’s redevelopment in conjunction with the station’s opening.

The glass-clad elevator shaft aligns with an escalator covered by an undulating canopy and is followed by a unique walkway adorned with large circular patterns and seating areas. A fourth skylight, cylindrical in shape and decorated with mosaics, is situated near the center of Via Diaz within one of these circles. Parallel to the walkway is a row of circular canopies resembling overlapping umbrellas, which line the façade of the BNL building.

Inside the station, two large mosaics by William Kentridge, executed by mosaic artist Costantino Aureliano Buccolieri, dominate the space. The first mosaic, located in the mezzanine level, depicts a typical Neapolitan scene filled with people in motion, including the artist himself and Saint Januarius (San Gennaro). The artwork incorporates numerous references to Pompeii and Mount Vesuvius, with topographical maps of Naples in the background. The mezzanine is illuminated by natural light from the three external skylights and features segments of the Aragonese walls discovered during excavation.

Descending the escalators, which are internally lit, visitors encounter the second mosaic on the frontal wall. This artwork portrays two figures pushing a cart loaded with symbols of the 1799 Parthenopean Republic, alongside a cat derived from a Pompeian mosaic. In the background, one can discern plans for the urban renewal of Naples’ lower quarters in relation to the metropolitan railway.

The contrast between the two environments becomes evident when descending the escalators. After the initial flights, dominated by ochre-colored tiling reminiscent of Neapolitan tuff stone, the transition leads into Robert Wilson’s Sea Gallery: an entirely mosaic-covered space featuring marine motifs. This area incorporates aquatic references, such as lighting reminiscent of waves and a large pillar designed to resemble a giant fountain jet.

Within the station, the Naples branch of the Istituto Nazionale di Fisica Nucleare (INFN) has installed a cosmic-ray detector, accompanied by an informational totem, serving as a tool for scientific outreach.

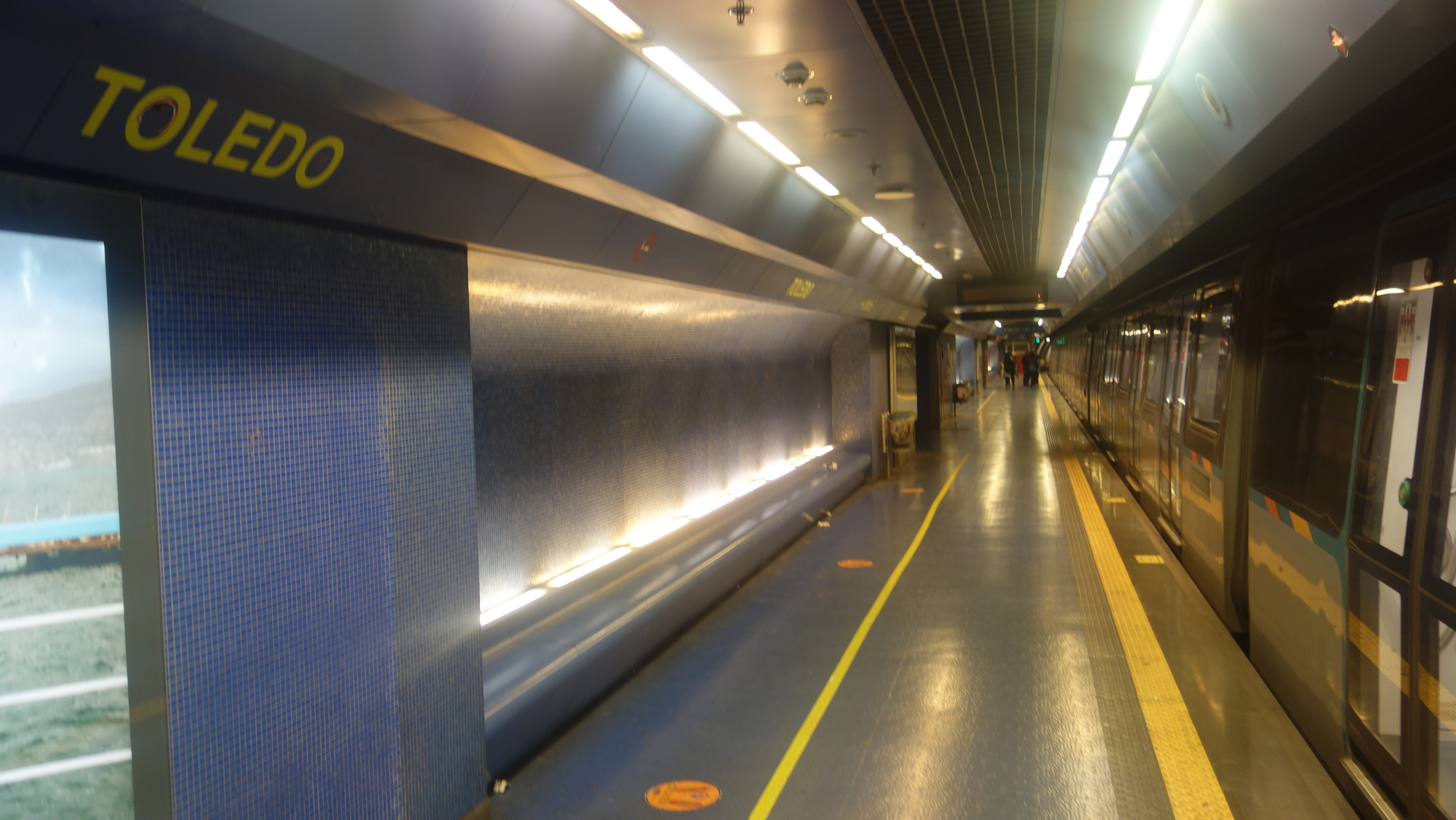
Platform.

Continuing through the corridor leading to the platforms, animated panels by Wilson depict a rippling sea, further emphasizing the marine theme.

On the mezzanine stairway walls, manipulated photographs by Achille Cevoli, such as Men at Work, showcase the construction of the subway tunnel.

The connecting corridor to the Largo Montecalvario exit is adorned with photographs by Oliviero Toscani, taken in various locations within the city’s historic center for his initiative Razza Umana/Italia. These images portray the faces of Neapolitan citizens who participated in the project by posing for the renowned photographer.

According to the British newspaper The Daily Telegraph, this station is the most beautiful subway station in Europe and the world, a recognition echoed by CNN’s rankings.

In 2013, it won the Emirates Leaf International Award as Public Building of the Year. In 2015, it received the International Tunnelling Association Award—known as the "Academy Award of Underground Works"—beating entries from Sydney and Jerusalem.

== Archaeological Finds ==
During excavations for the construction of the underground facilities, remnants of the late 15th to early 16th-century Aragonese fortifications were uncovered, including a bastion buried beneath layers of sediment. Traces of cellars, likely linked to the building initiatives commissioned by Don Pedro de Toledo during the creation of Via Toledo, also came to light. These walls incorporate Roman-era structures made of small tuff blocks interspersed with brick bands, which likely belonged to a thermal bath complex dating back to the 2nd century CE.

Beneath these structures, a paleosol was discovered, characterized by intersecting plow marks and accompanied by ceramic fragments associated with the Diana culture, dating to the Late Neolithic period (late 5th to early 4th millennium BCE). Photographs and casts of these traces are exhibited at the Stazione Neapolis within the Museo station.

== See also ==
- List of Naples metro stations
- Art Stations of the Naples Metro
- List of metro systems
