= Dante station (Naples) =

Naples Metro station

Coordinates: 40°50′56″N 14°15′01″E

Dante
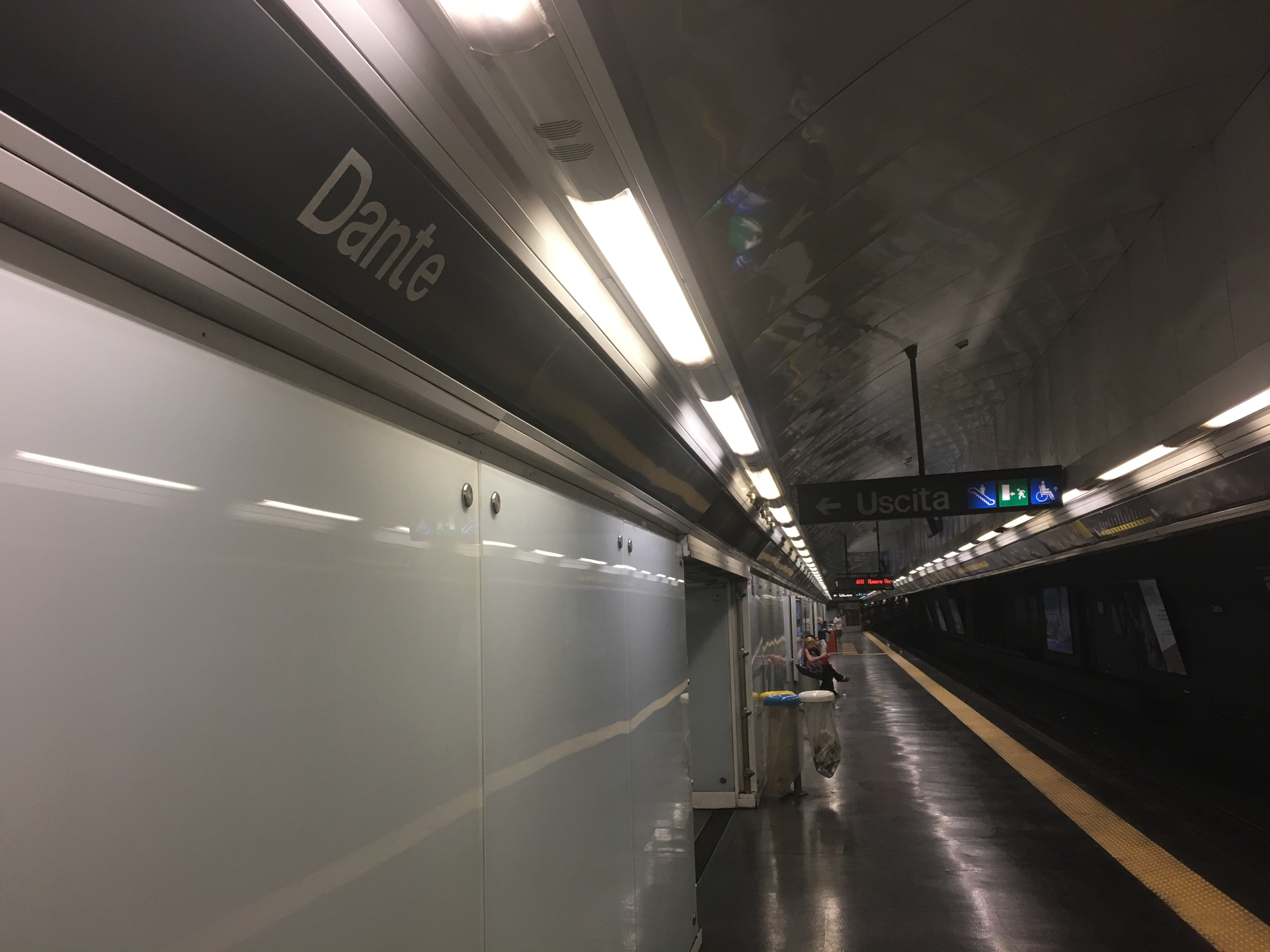
- Dante

General information
- System: Naples Metro station
- Operator: ANM
- Line: Line 1

History
- Opened: 27 March 2002

Services
Preceding station	Naples Metro	Following station
Museo towards Piscinola Scampia	Line 1	Toledo towards Centro Direzionale
Route map
Location

Dante is a Naples Metro on Line 1. It opened on 27 March 2002 as one-station extension from Museo. The station is located between Museo and Toledo. On 28 March 2011 the line was further extended to Università as non-stop shuttle service, as Toledo and Municipio stations were not yet ready.

The station is named after Piazza Dante, which, in turn, is named after Dante Alighieri.
