= Line 11 (Naples Metro) =

Metro line in Naples, Italy

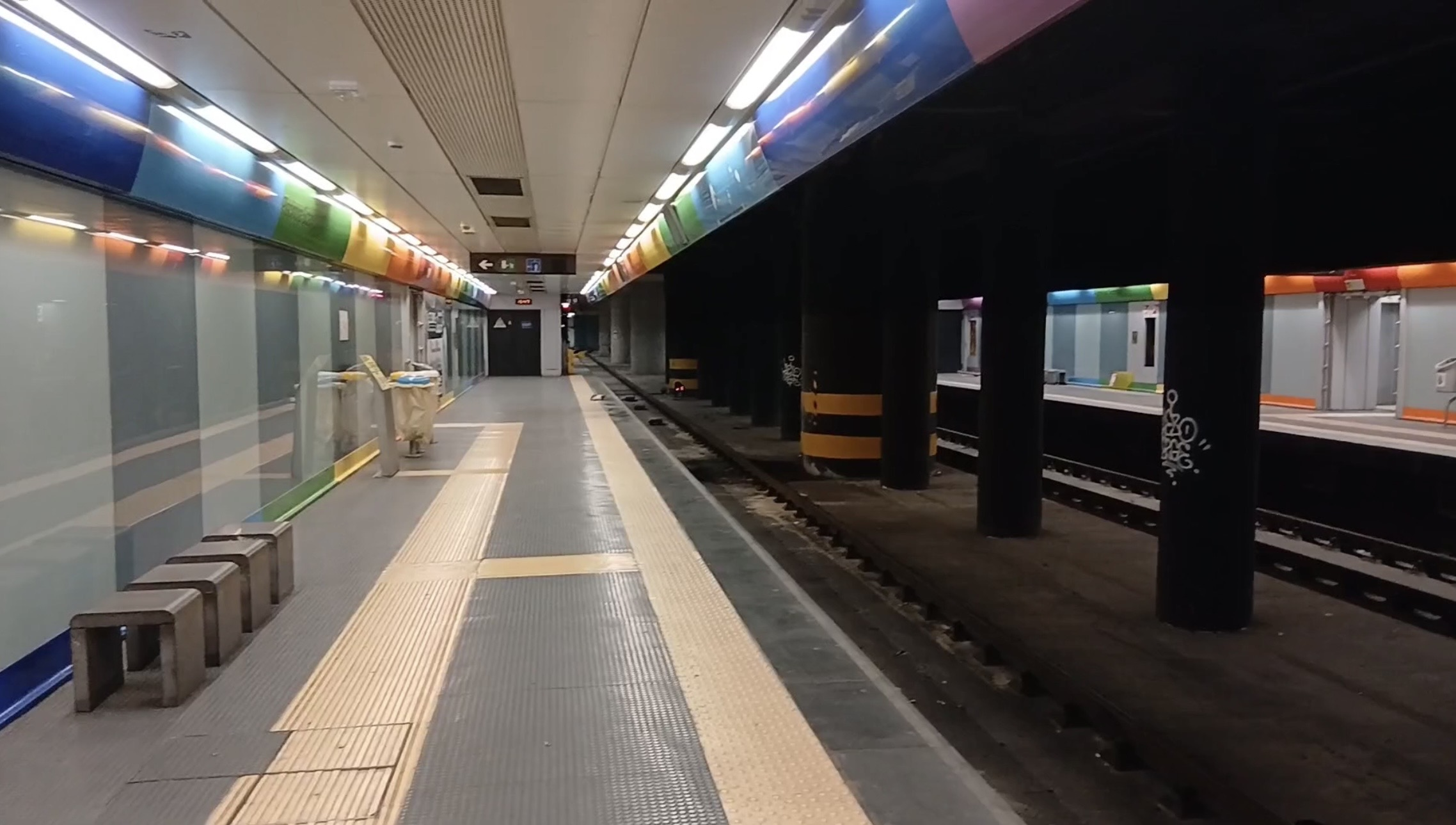
- Piscinola Scampia station

Overview
- Status: Operational
- Locale: Metropolitan City of Naples; Aversa (Province of Caserta)
- Termini: Piscinola Scampia; Aversa Centro
- Connecting lines: Line 1
- Stations: 5 (planned total of 11)

Service
- Type: Rapid transit
- System: Naples Metro
- Operator(s): EAV

History
- Opened: 16 July 2005; 20 years ago
- Last extension: 2009

Technical
- Line length: 10.5 km (6.5 mi)
- Character: Deep level
- Track gauge: 1,435 mm (4 ft 8 1/2 in) standard gauge
- Electrification: 1,500 V DC overhead catenary
- Operating speed: 90 km/h (56 mph)
Route map
- (*) Planned (**) Under construction

Line 11 (Italian: Linea 11), also known as the Rainbow Line (Italian: Linea Arcobaleno), as each station is identified by a different colour, is a Naples Metro line that connects the city to its northern suburbs. Printed in rainbow on the map, it serves 4 underground stations. It is operated by EAV.

== History ==
The first section of the line, between Piscinola and Mugnano, was opened in 2005.

In 2009, the line was extended from Mugnano to Aversa Centro, with two intermediate stops in Giugliano and Aversa Ippodromo.

== Route ==
The line connects Naples (Piscinola Scampia station) to the town of Aversa. Only Piscinola station (shared with line 1) is within the municipality of Naples.

Line 11 (Naples Metro)

Naples Metro Line 11
Station Name	Transfer	Opening
Di Vittorio	Interchange with Line 1	
Secondigliano	Under construction	
Regina Margherita	Under construction	
Miano	Under construction	
Piscinola Scampia	Interchange with Line 1	2005
Mugnano		2005
Melito	Under construction	
Giugliano		2009
Aversa Ippodromo		2009
Aversa Centro		2009

== Management ==
The line is managed by Ente Autonomo Volturno (EAV) company.

== Service ==
Trains usually travel every 15 minutes, and every 10 minutes during peak hours.

== See also ==
- Naples Metro
- List of suburban and commuter rail systems
