= Museo station =

Naples Metro station

Coordinates: 40°51′14″N 14°15′09″E

Museo
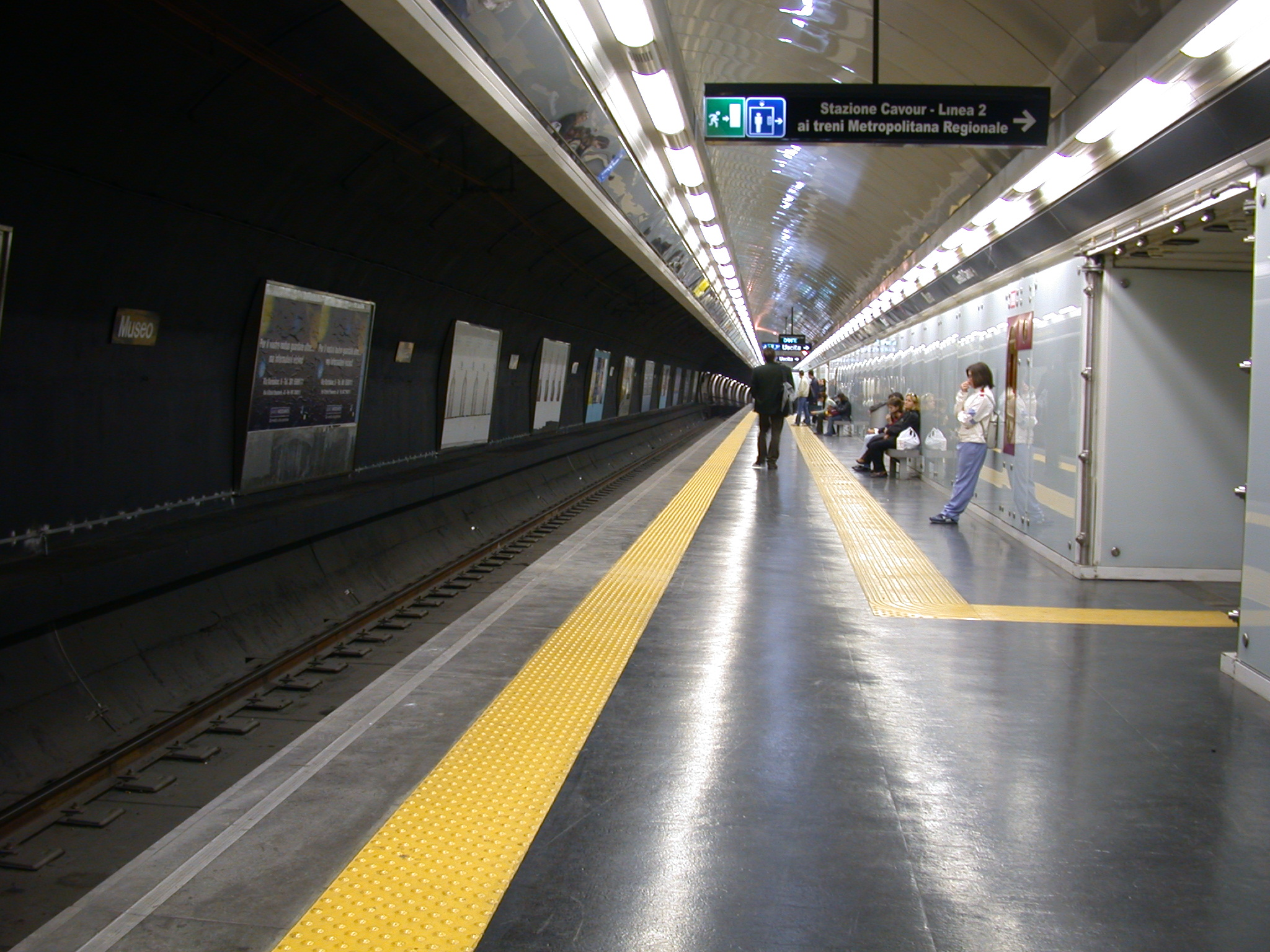
- Museo

General information
- System: Naples Metro station
- Operator: ANM
- Line: Line 1

History
- Opened: 5 April 2001

Services
Preceding station	Naples Metro	Following station
Materdei towards Piscinola Scampia	Line 1	Dante towards Centro Direzionale
Route map
Location

Museo is a Naples Metro station on Line 1. It opened on 5 April 2001 as the eastern terminus of the section of the line between Vanvitelli and Museo. On 27 March 2002 the line was extended to Dante. The station is located between Materdei and Dante. Materdei station was added to the line on 5 July 2003, and before that date, the adjacent station was Salvator Rosa.
