= Aversa Centro station =

Metro station in Aversa, Campania, Italy

Coordinates: 40.9741°N 14.2136°E

Aversa Centro
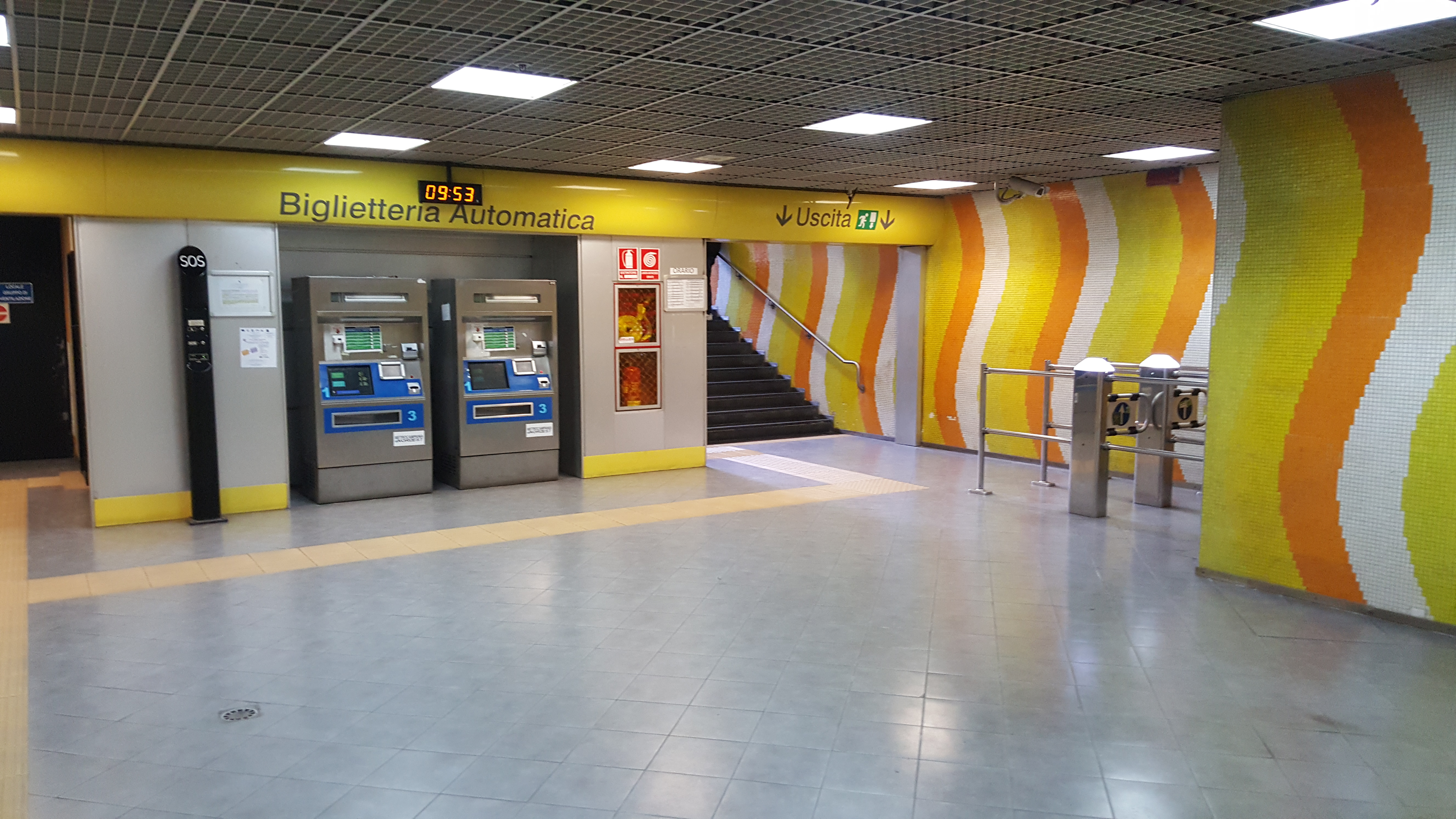
- Hall

General information
- Location: Aversa, Campania
- System: Naples Metro station
- Operator: EAV
- Manager: Naples Metro
- Line: Line 11
- Tracks: 2
- Connections: Aversa railway station, Urban buses

Construction
- Structure type: In use

History
- Opened: April 24, 2009

Services
Preceding station	Naples Metro	Following station
Aversa Ippodromo towards Piscinola Scampia	Line 11	Terminus
Location

Aversa Centro is an underground metro station that serves Line 11 on the Naples Metro and together with Piscinola–Scampia is one of the two termini of Line 11.

The previous station is Aversa Ippodromo.

== History ==
The station opened on April 24, 2009, as part of the extension coming from Mugnano, and since then it has served as the northern terminus of the line.

== Station building ==
The side walls of the vestibule are covered with a mosaic of small tiles, arranged in vertical waves in warm colors—yellow, orange, and white; not by chance, yellow is the color that characterizes the station.

== Gallery ==
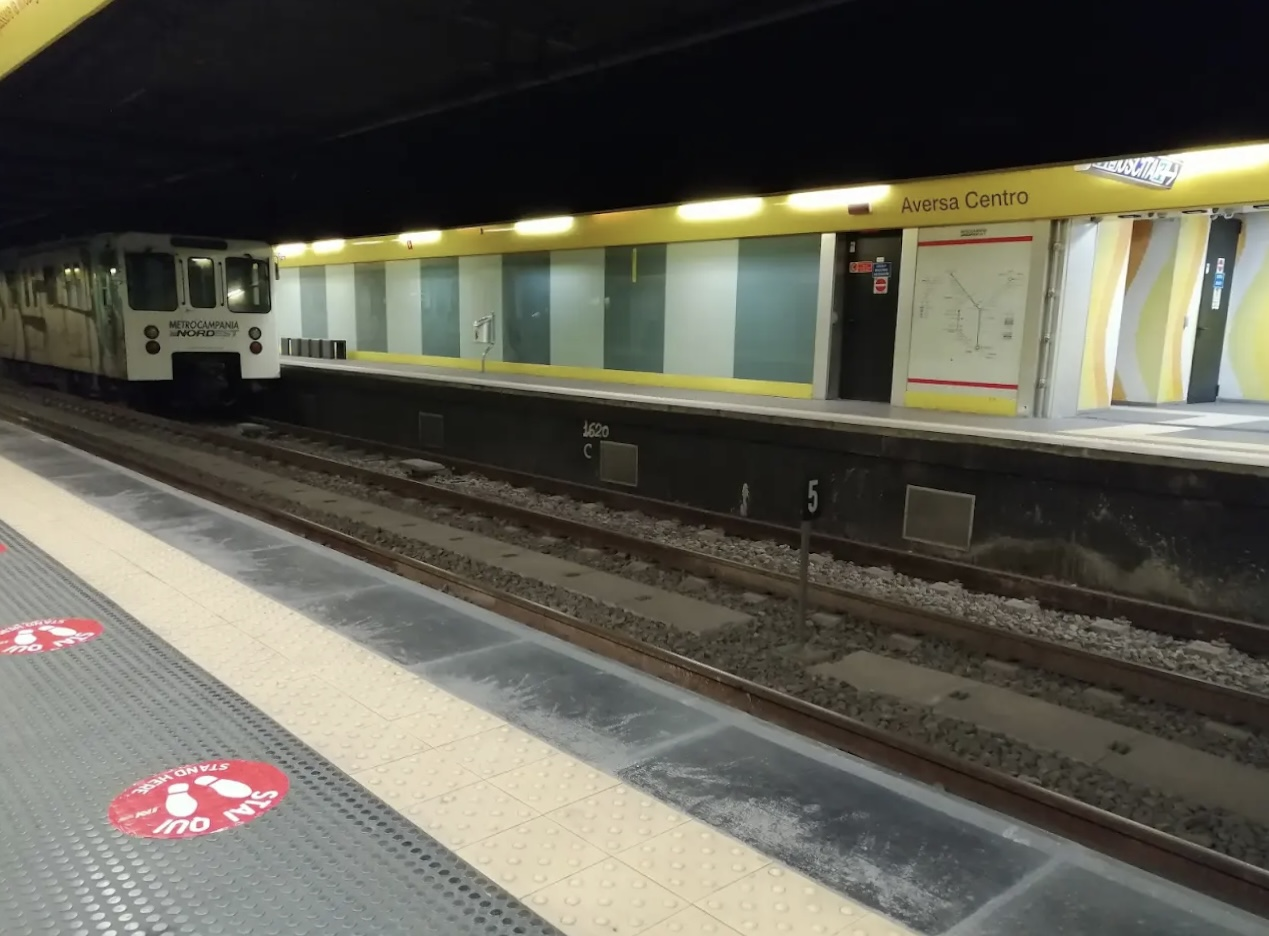
Platform level

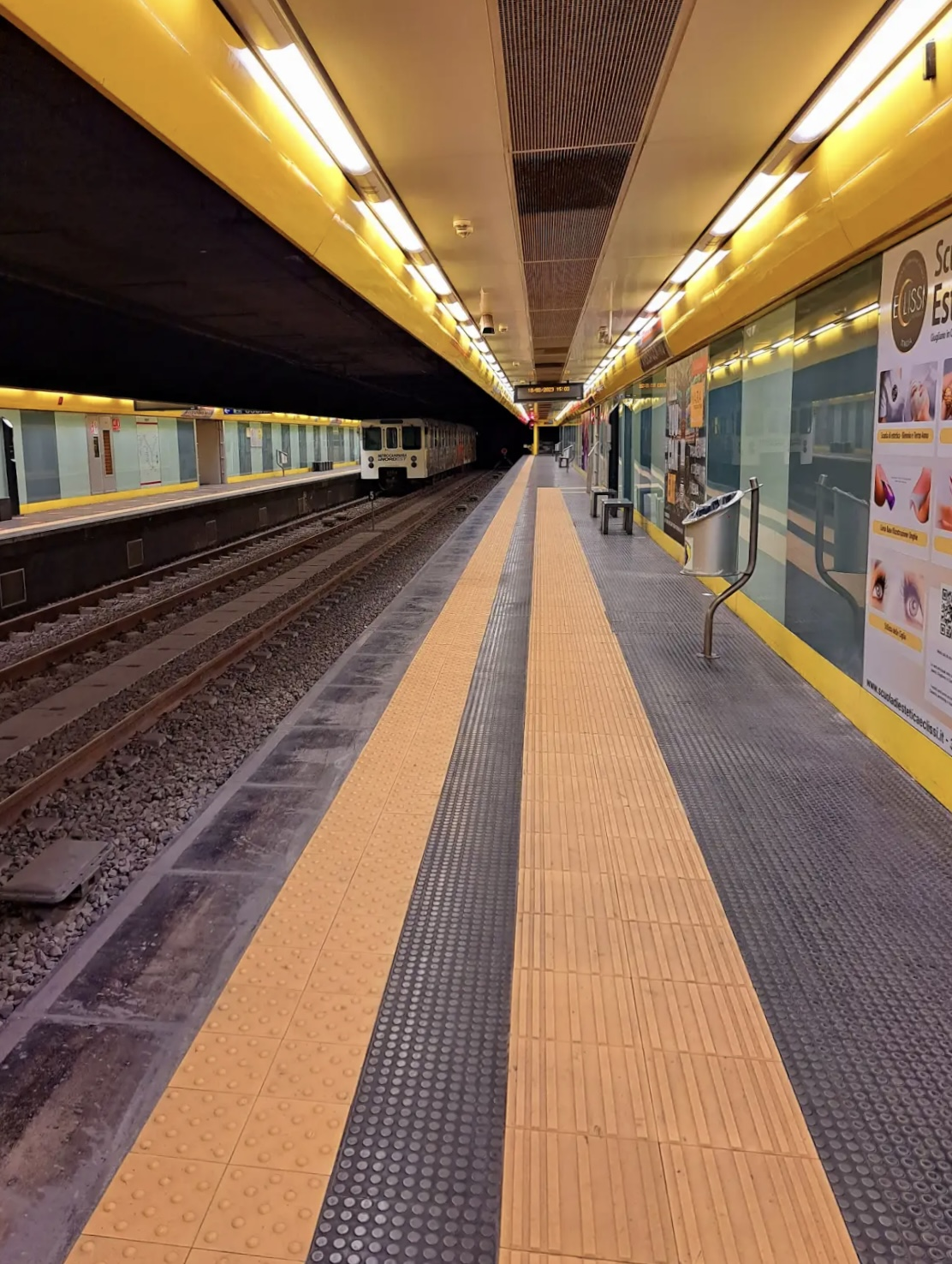
The platform level and the tunnel towards Piscinola

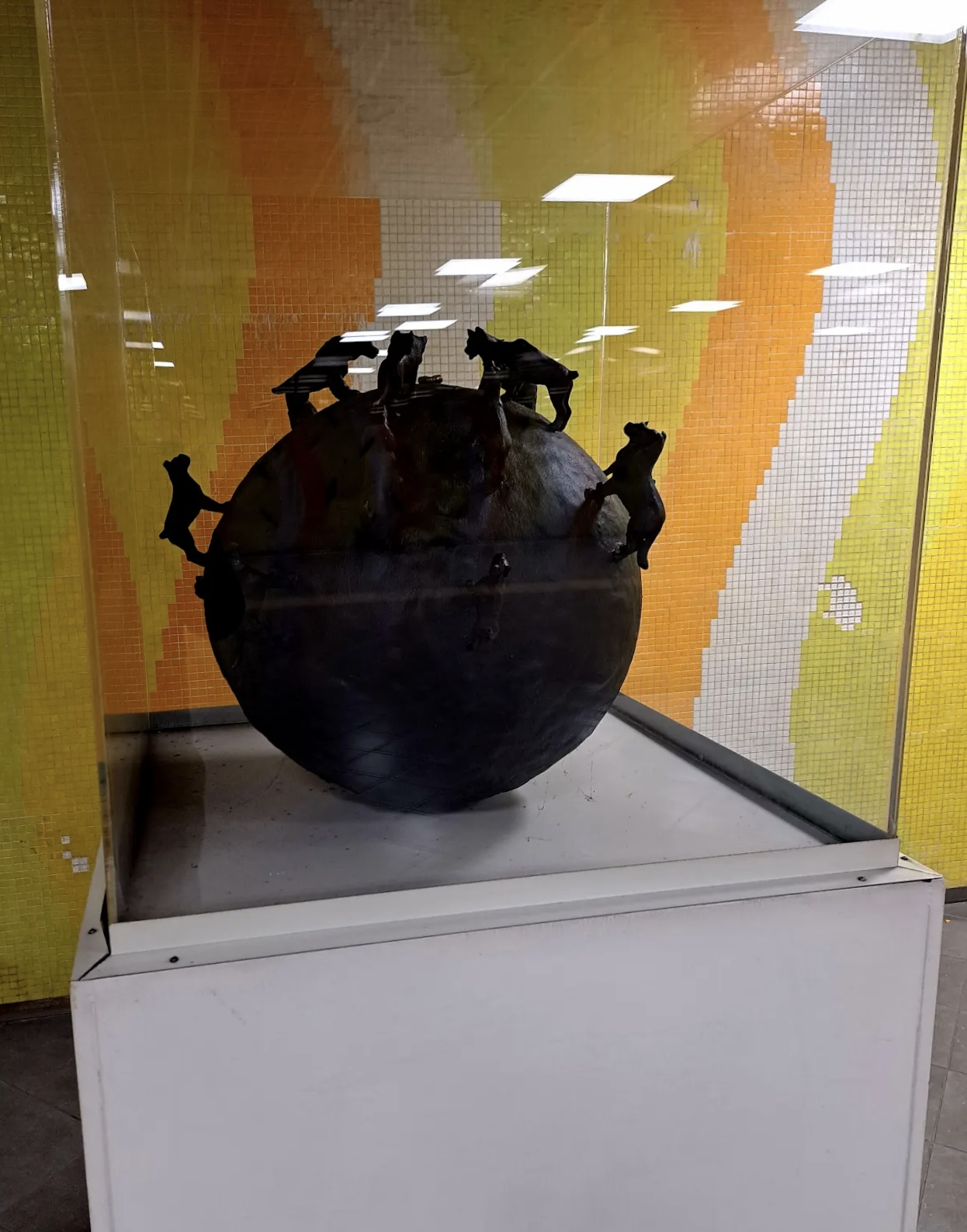
Art installation

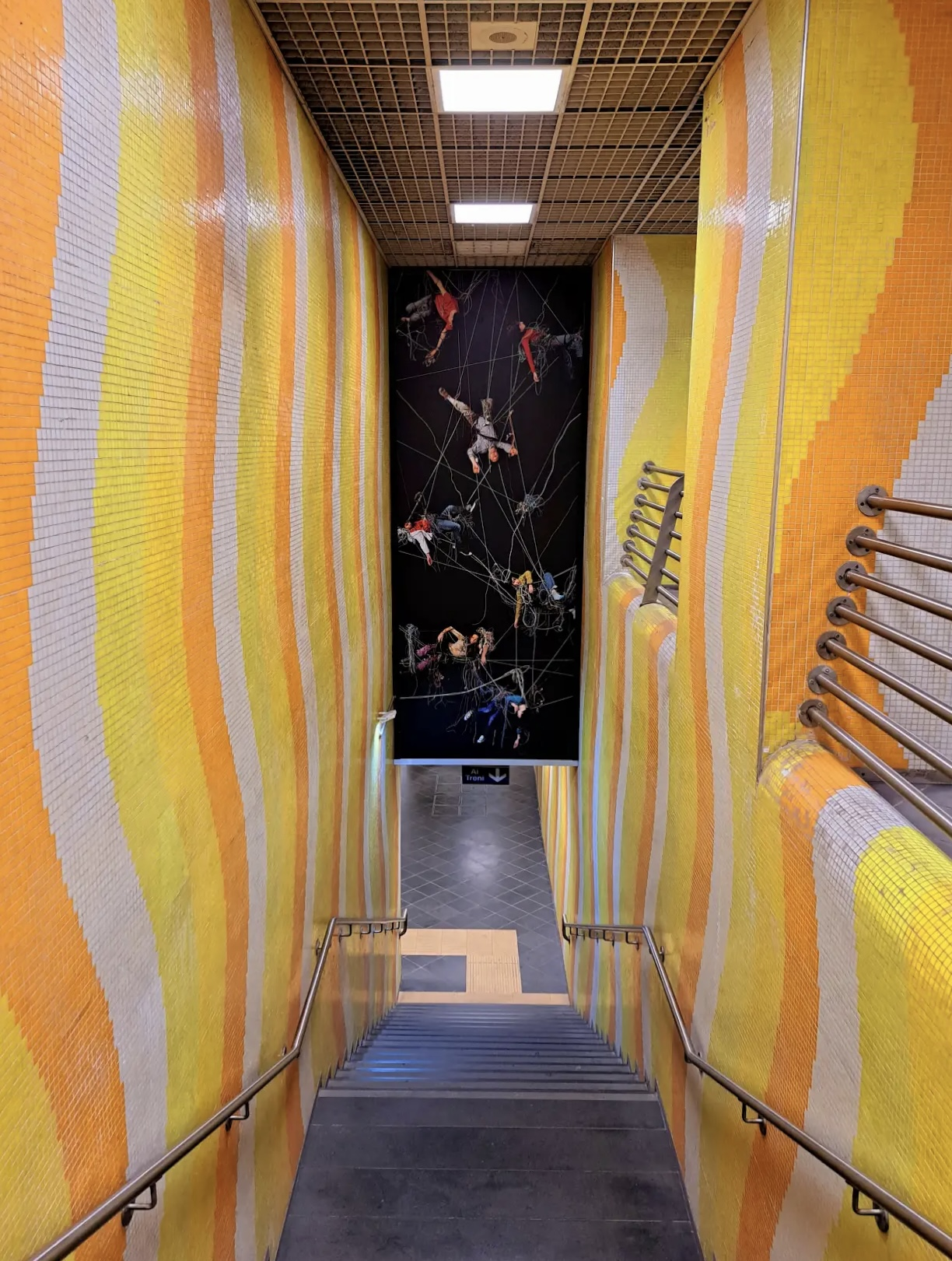
Traditional stairs

== See also ==
- List of Naples Metro stations
