= Piscinola–Scampia station =

Naples Metro station

Piscinola–Scampia

General information
- Coordinates: 40.8929°N 14.2397°E
- System: Naples Metro station
- Operator: ANM
- Lines: Line 1 and Line 11

History
- Opened: 19 July 1995

Services
Preceding station	Naples Metro	Following station
Terminus	Line 1	Chiaiano-Marianella towards Centro Direzionale
Preceding station	Naples Metro	Following station
Terminus	Line 11	Mugnano towards Aversa Centro
Location

The Piscinola–Scampia is a Naples Metro station that serves Line 1 and Line 11 and together with Garibaldi is one of the two termini of Line 1.

The station, inaugurated on 19 July 1995 together with the extension from the Colli Aminei station, consists of two levels: in the upper one stands the terminal station of Line 1, while in the lower one is the terminal station of Line 11, which between 2005 and 2009 partially restored the lower Alifana closed in 1976.

It has been decided that this station will not be a fixed terminus, as the line will continue towards the Capodichino airport, the business center until reaching Piazza Garibaldi. The station will therefore be located between the Miano and Chiaiano stops.

Since 2013 the station has hosted some works by the Neapolitan artist Felice Pignataro, following a petition signed by the citizens.

== Services ==
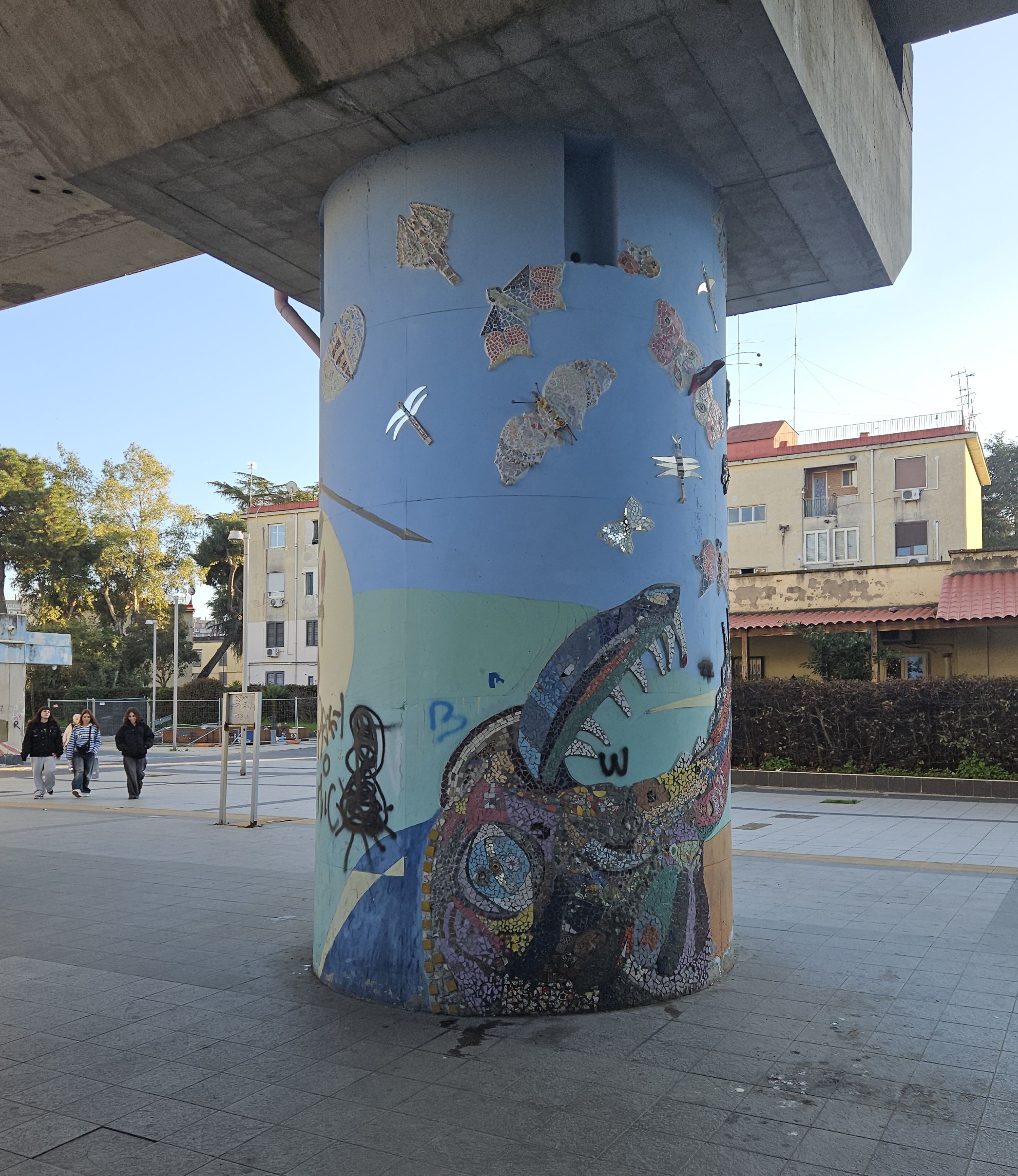
A decorated pillar featuring mosaic artwork near the station

The station has:

- Ticket office
- Escalators
- Elevator
- Wheelchair accessible
- Toilets

== Exchanges ==
- Bus stop
