= San Pasquale station =

Metro station in Naples, Italy

Coordinates: 40°49′56″N 14°14′30″E

San Pasquale
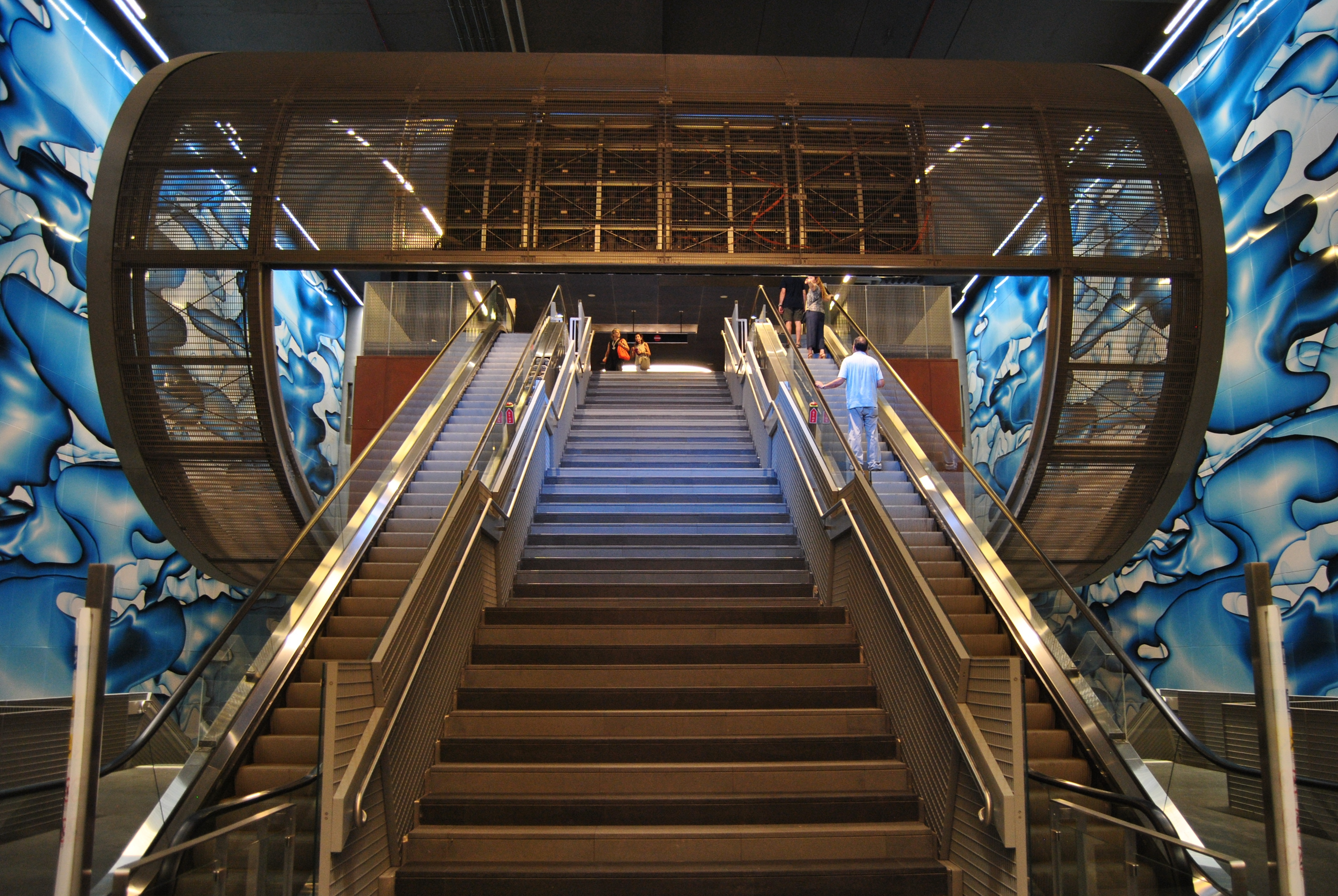

General information
- Location: Piazza Vittoria, Naples
- System: Naples Metro station
- Operator: ANN
- Line: Line 6
- Connections: Urban and suburban buses

Construction
- Structure type: In use

History
- Opened: 17 July 2024

Services
Preceding station	Naples Metro	Following station
Chiaia Monte di Dio towards Municipio	Line 6	Arco Mirelli towards Mostra
Route map
Location

San Pasquale is a metro station that serves Line 6 on the Naples Metro. The San Pasquale station, designed by the architect Boris Podrecca, serves the areas of Via Caracciolo, the Villa Comunale (within which there is the Zoological Station Anton Dohrn) and the central part of Chiaia district, and part of San Ferdinando.

The railway complex is located on the eastern edge of the Villa Comunale, in opposition to the previous line stop in Piazza della Repubblica, the west end. The previous station is Chiaia - Monte di Dio, the next is Arco Mirelli.

== See also ==
- List of Naples metro stations
