= Lala station =

Naples Metro station

Coordinates: 40°49′36″N 14°12′15″E

Lala
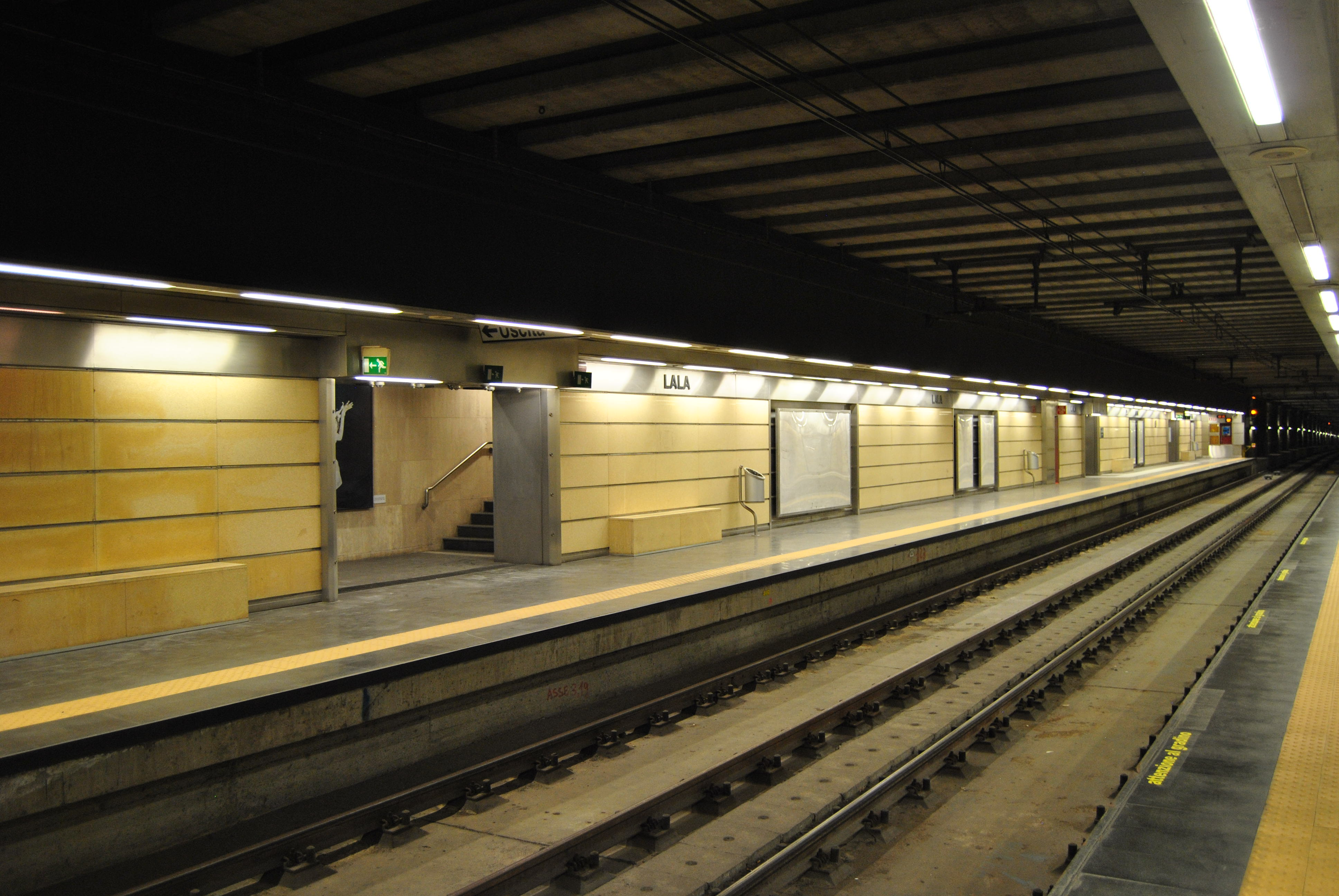

General information
- Location: Largo Alessandro Lala, Naples
- System: Naples Metro station
- Operator: ANM
- Line: Line 6
- Connections: Urban and suburban buses

History
- Opened: 4 February 2007

Services
Preceding station	Naples Metro	Following station
Mergellina towards Municipio	Line 6	Augusto towards Mostra
Route map
Location

Lala is a Naples Metro underground station that serves Line 6. It was opened on 4 February 2007 as part of the inaugural section of Line 6 between Mergellina and Mostra.

Is located in the Fuorigrotta neighborhood of Naples, and was designed by Uberto Siola. The station was opened along the line, on 11 January 2007 and consists of 2 binary passers-by. Lala is a station being decorated with works of art Castella, Campigotto and Dago.

== See also ==
- List of Naples Metro stations
