= Augusto station =

Naples Metro station

Coordinates: 40°49′34″N 14°11′54″E

Augusto
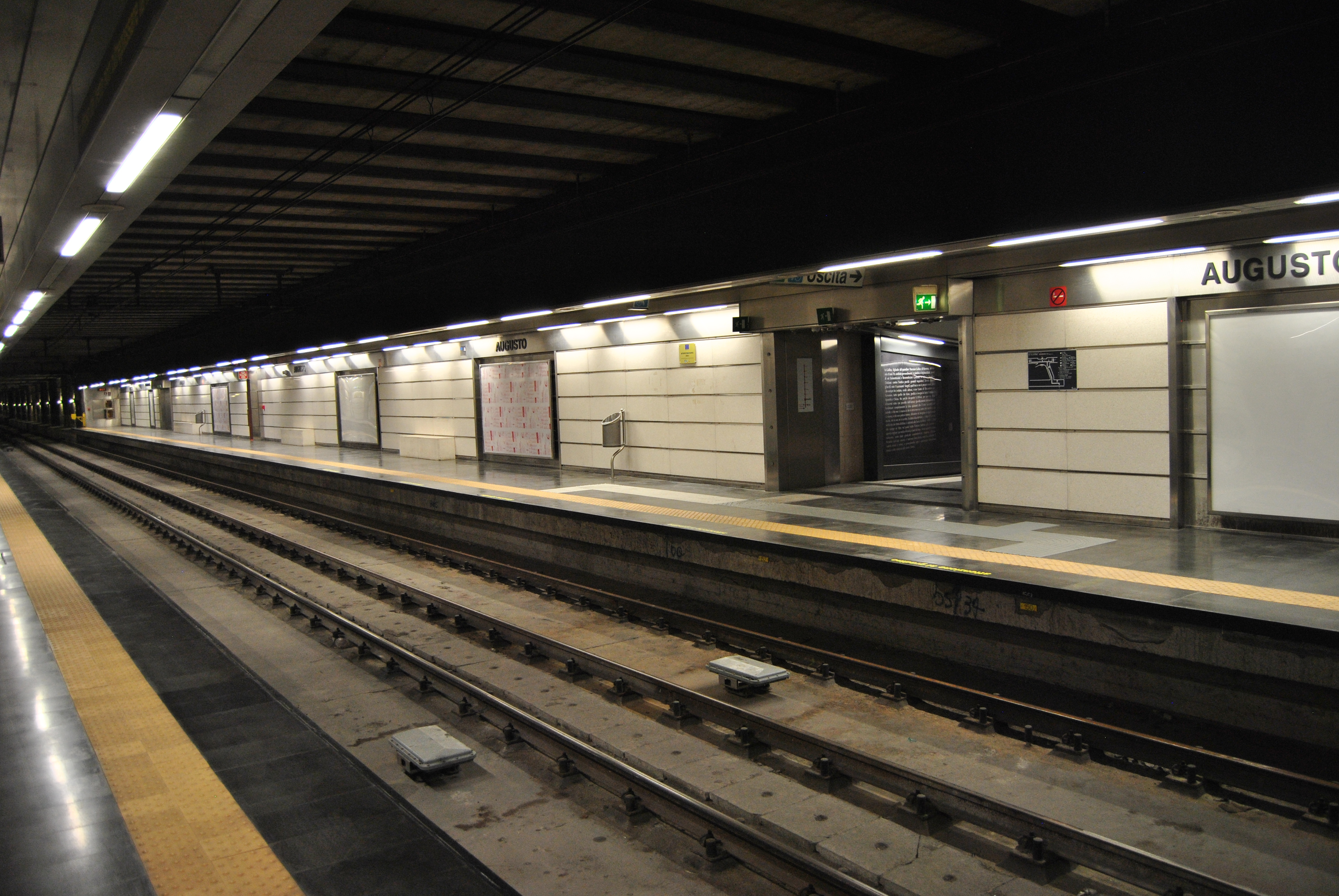

General information
- Location: Viale di Augusto, Naples
- System: Naples Metro station
- Operator: ANM
- Line: Line 6
- Connections: Urban and suburban buses

History
- Opened: 4 February 2007

Services
Preceding station	Naples Metro	Following station
Lala towards Municipio	Line 6	Mostra Terminus
Route map
Location

Augusto is a Naples Metro underground station that serves Line 6. It was opened on 4 February 2007 as part of the inaugural section of Line 6 between Mergellina and Mostra.

Augusto Station, which has two tracks and loops, is situated on one of Naples' busiest streets and most densely populated neighbourhoods. It is considered among the stations of the Craft as it houses works by Bruno Scognamiglio and Crespo.

== See also ==
- List of Naples Metro stations
