= Mergellina station (Naples Metro) =

Naples Metro station

Mergellina
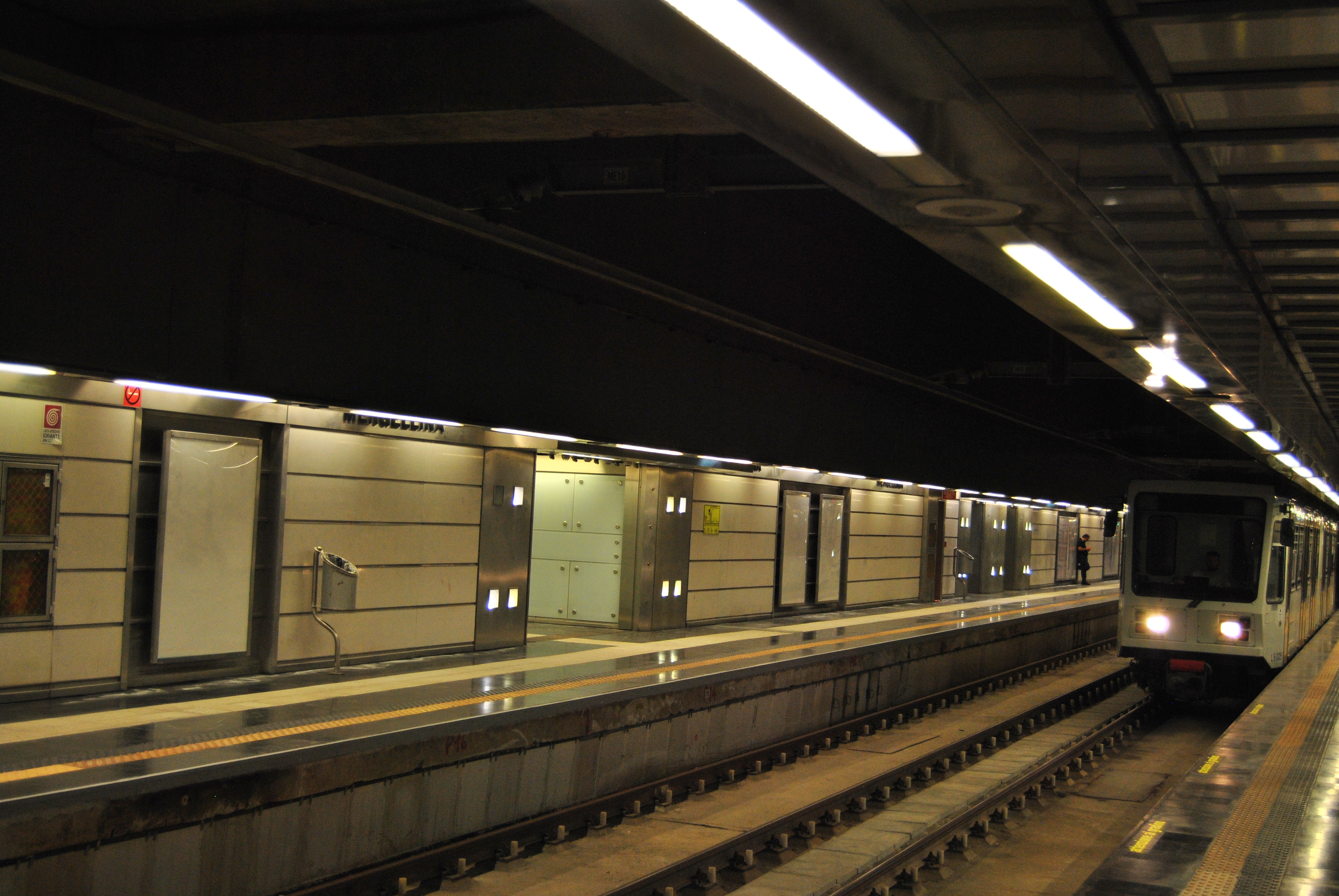

General information
- Location: Naples
- Coordinates: 40.8306°N 14.2174°E
- System: Naples Metro station
- Operator: ANM
- Line: Line 6
- Connections: Urban and suburban buses

History
- Opened: 4 February 2007

Services
Preceding station	Naples Metro	Following station
Arco Mirelli towards Municipio	Line 6	Lala towards Mostra
Route map
Location

Mergellina is a Naples Metro underground station that serves Line 6. It was opened on 4 February 2007 as part of the inaugural section of Line 6 between Mergellina and Mostra.

The station is designed by Lampugnani and entry into service February 4, 2007. There are two binary logs. As with the entire line, passenger traffic is still at most, given the small size of the line. Station is reached by passing under the bridge of the metro Line 2. Mergellina is part of the Art Stations and has been decorated with works by Merz. Another special feature of the station is the inclined elevator.

== See also ==
- List of Naples Metro stations
