= Chiaia–Monte di Dio station =

Metro station in Naples, Italy

Chiaia - Monte di Dio
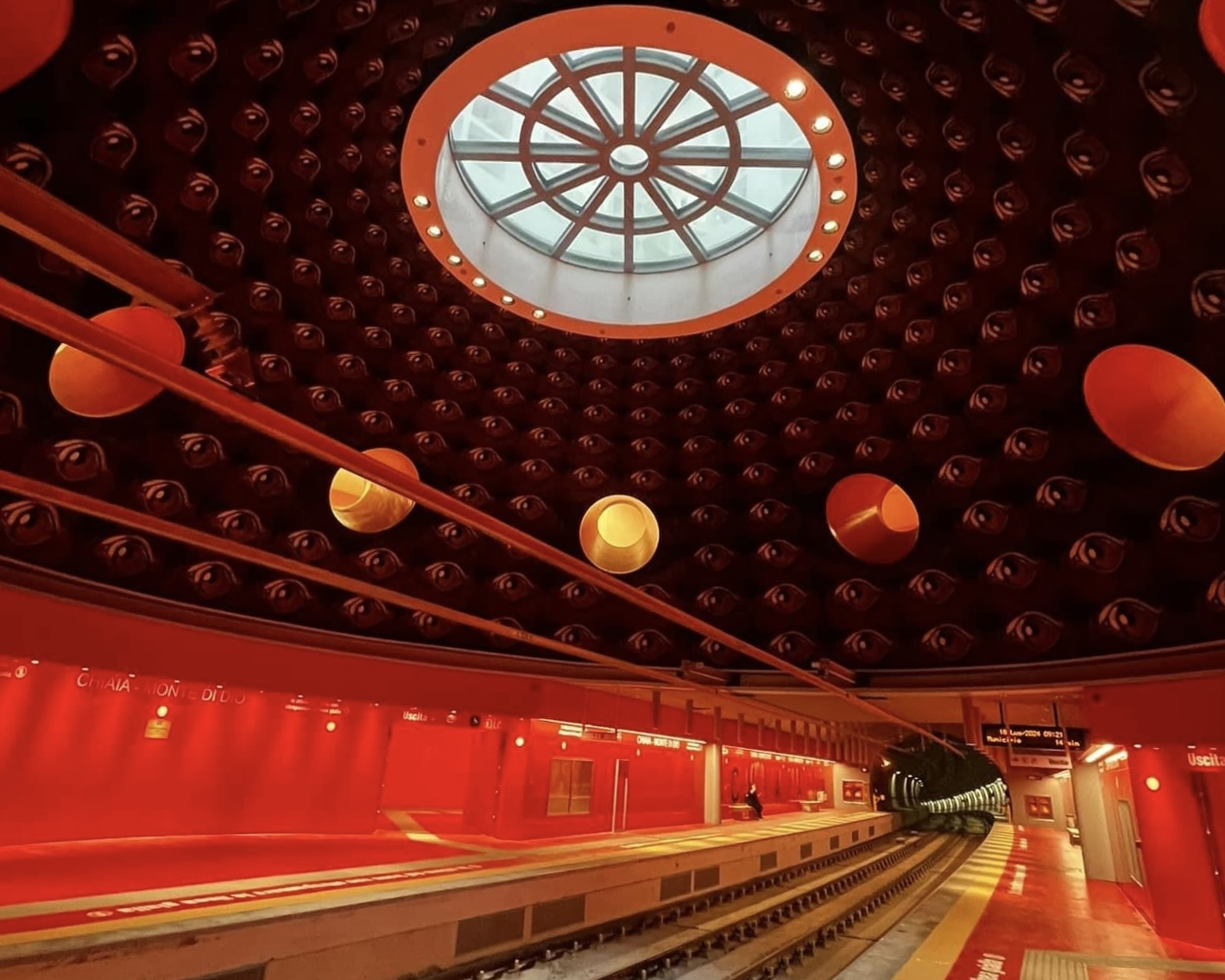

General information
- Location: Via Chiaia; Piazza Santa Maria degli Angeli, Naples
- Coordinates: 40.83556°N 14.24528°E
- System: Naples Metro station
- Operator: ANM
- Manager: Naples Metro
- Line: Line 6
- Tracks: 2
- Connections: Piazza Amedeo (Line 2 Chiaia Funicular; Urban buses

Construction
- Structure type: In use
- Accessible: Yes

History
- Opened: 2024

Services
Preceding station	Naples Metro	Following station
Municipio Terminus	Line 6	San Pasquale towards Mostra
Route map
Location

Chiaia – Monte di Dio is an underground metro station that serves Line 6 on the Naples Metro. The station, designed by the architect Hubert Siola, serve a wide area around the hill Pizzafalcone, on the border between the districts Chiaia and San Ferdinando.

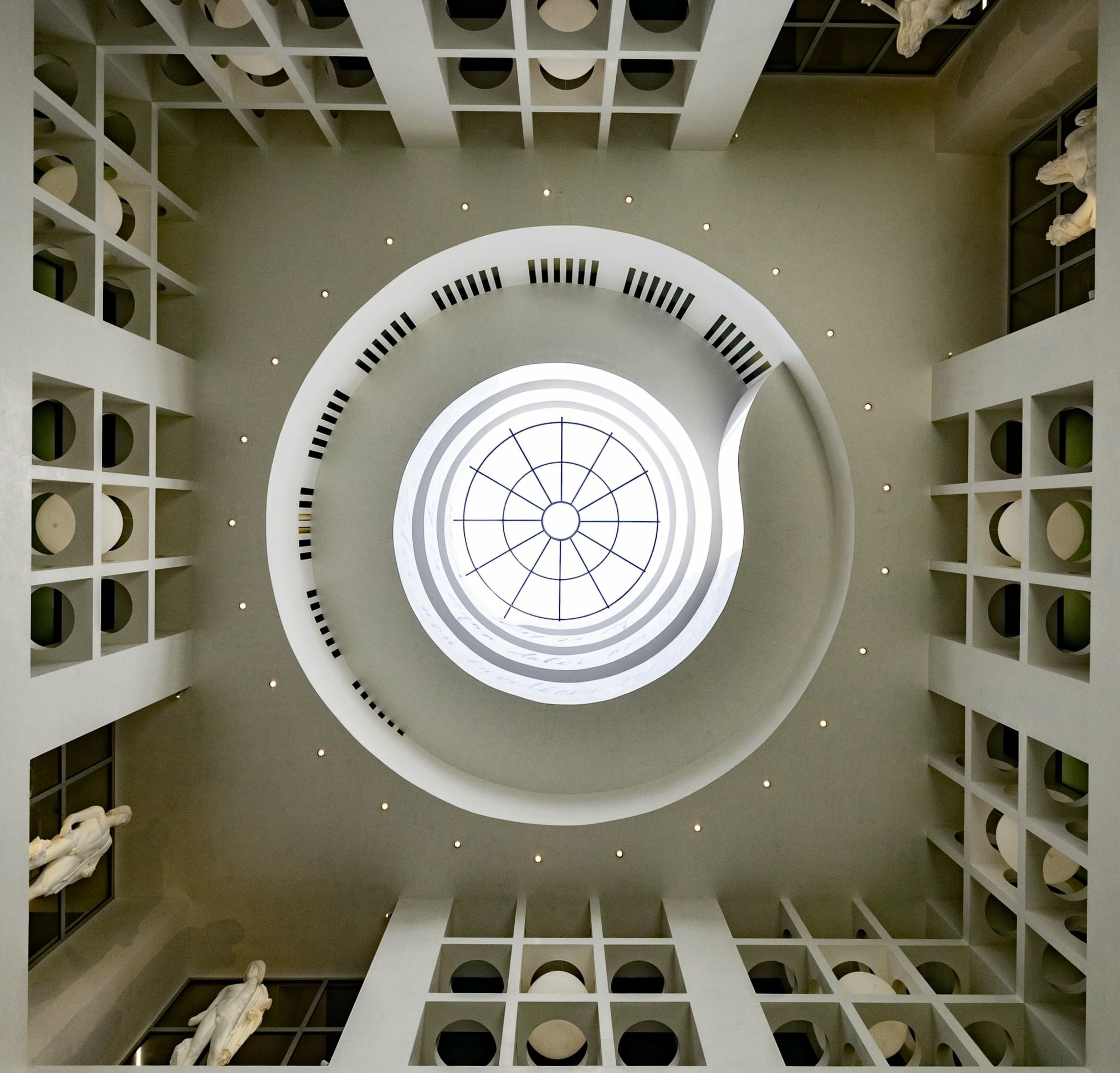
The glass dome

The surroundings of the station are rich in sites of interest, both from the point of view of art as the Piazza del Plebiscito, Palazzo Reale and the Galleria Umberto I, the Teatro di San Carlo and Politeama, the lookout of Mount Echia, both from the administrative point of view as 1 Municipality of the City of Naples and the Prefecture, and the shopping streets like via Chiaia, via dei Mille and via Toledo.

The previous station is Municipio, the next is San Pasquale

== History ==
The station was planned in the 2004 project variant of Line 6, replacing the station in Piazza dei Martiri. Construction work began in 2008 and was completed in 2024. It was inaugurated on July 17, 2024, along with the reopening of the line.

== Station building ==
The station, designed by Uberto Siola, is part of the "art stations" circuit. It has two entrances on different levels. The upper entrance is located in the center of Piazza Santa Maria degli Angeli, in the Monte di Dio area. The lower entrance is on Via Chiaia, at the corresponding bridge.

The artistic installation by Peter Greenaway is conceptually intended to represent a journey through the mythology of Greek gods, starting from the upper entrance down to the platform level. The upper entrance is topped by a steel and crystal glass dome with a lowered arch, which allows natural light to filter down for about forty meters, illuminating the tracks. At the station's entrance, there is a statue of Jupiter with twenty-four arms, symbolizing the protector of travelers.

The lower area, characterized by white and blue colors, is a twelve-meter diameter well dedicated to Neptune. The well, which channels light from the dome, is traversed by a helical staircase. Ovid's verse "Est in aqua dulci non invidiosa voluptas" (In Pure Water There is a Pleasure Begrudged by None) is inscribed on the parapet. Near the entrance to this area are remains of the ancient Serino aqueduct, which passed through the area during the Roman era.

Below is the level beneath the Via Chiaia entrance, dedicated to Ceres and dominated by the color green. It is structured in a square matrix form, housing an exhibition of large reproductions of statues from the Farnese collection of the National Archaeological Museum of Naples.

The lower entrance is connected to the platform level by a level characterized by the color ochre, dedicated to Proserpina, depicted by six pomegranates. The track level, characterized by the color red and dedicated to Hades, is dominated by a steel dome with a hollow center to allow natural light to pass through, featuring 320 orange eyes representing the gaze of the King of the Underworld on the waiting travelers. It has two tracks in a single tube and two lateral platforms.

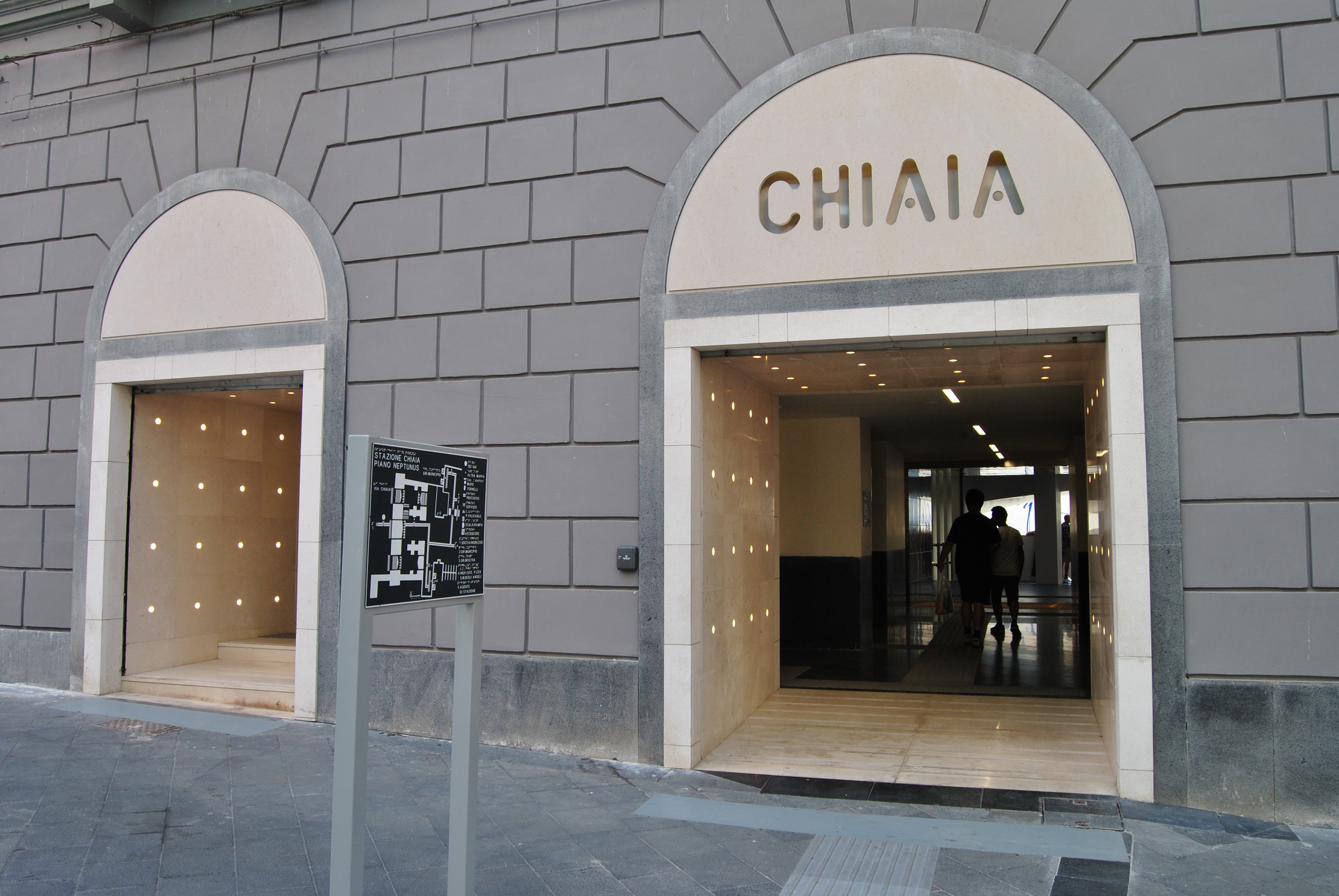
The lower entrance on Via Chiaia

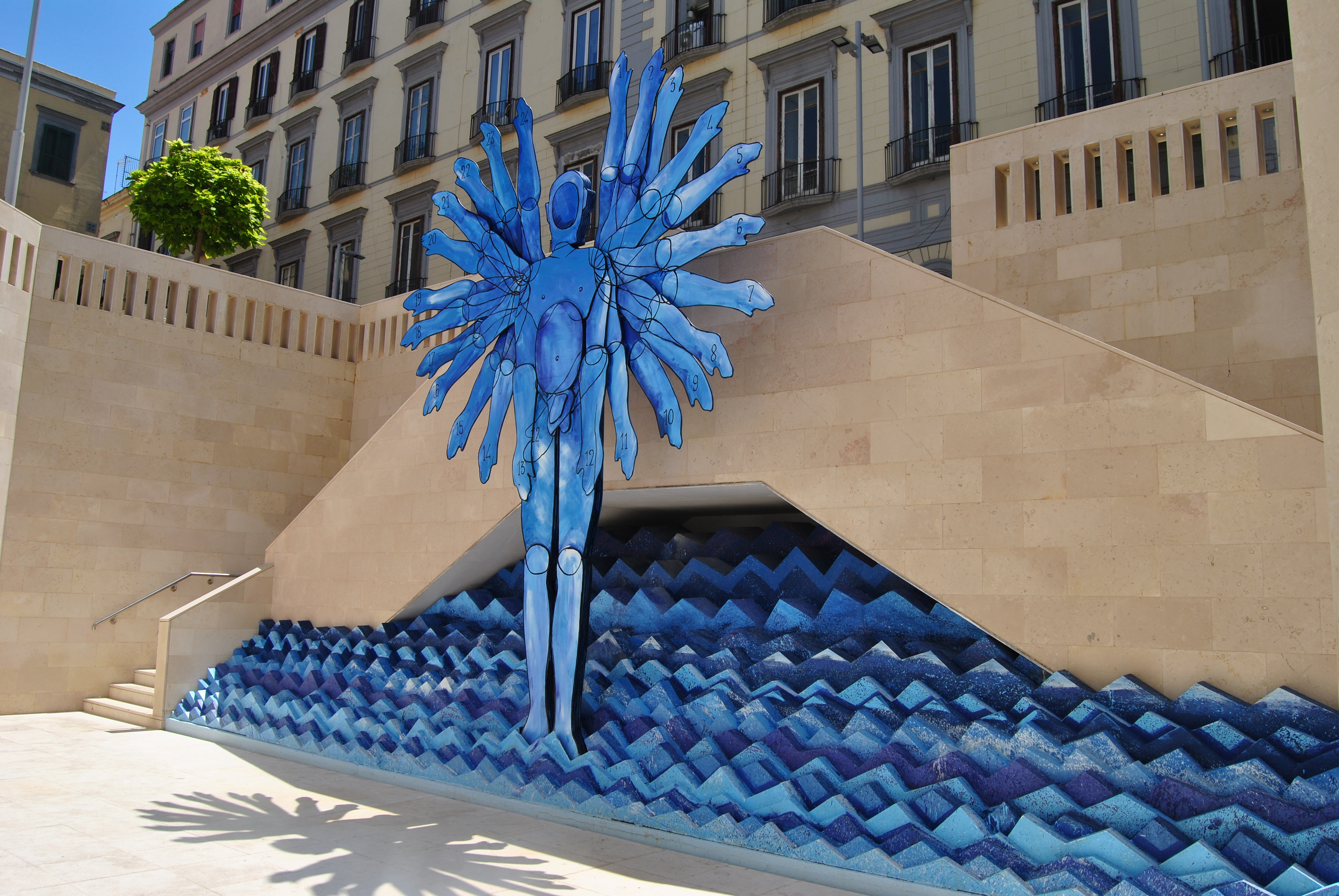
The upper entrance in Piazza Santa Maria degli Angeli with the statue of Jupiter

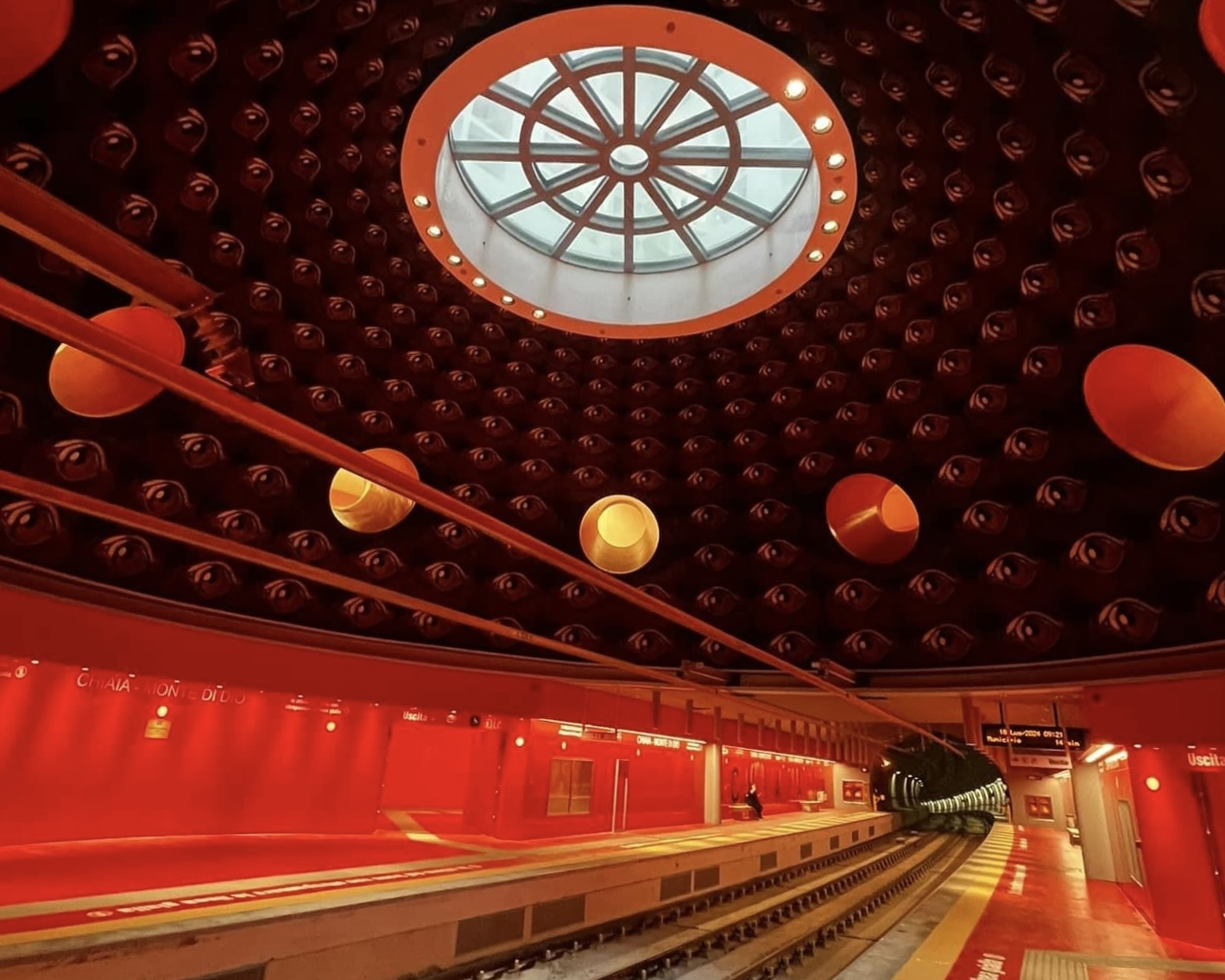
The platform

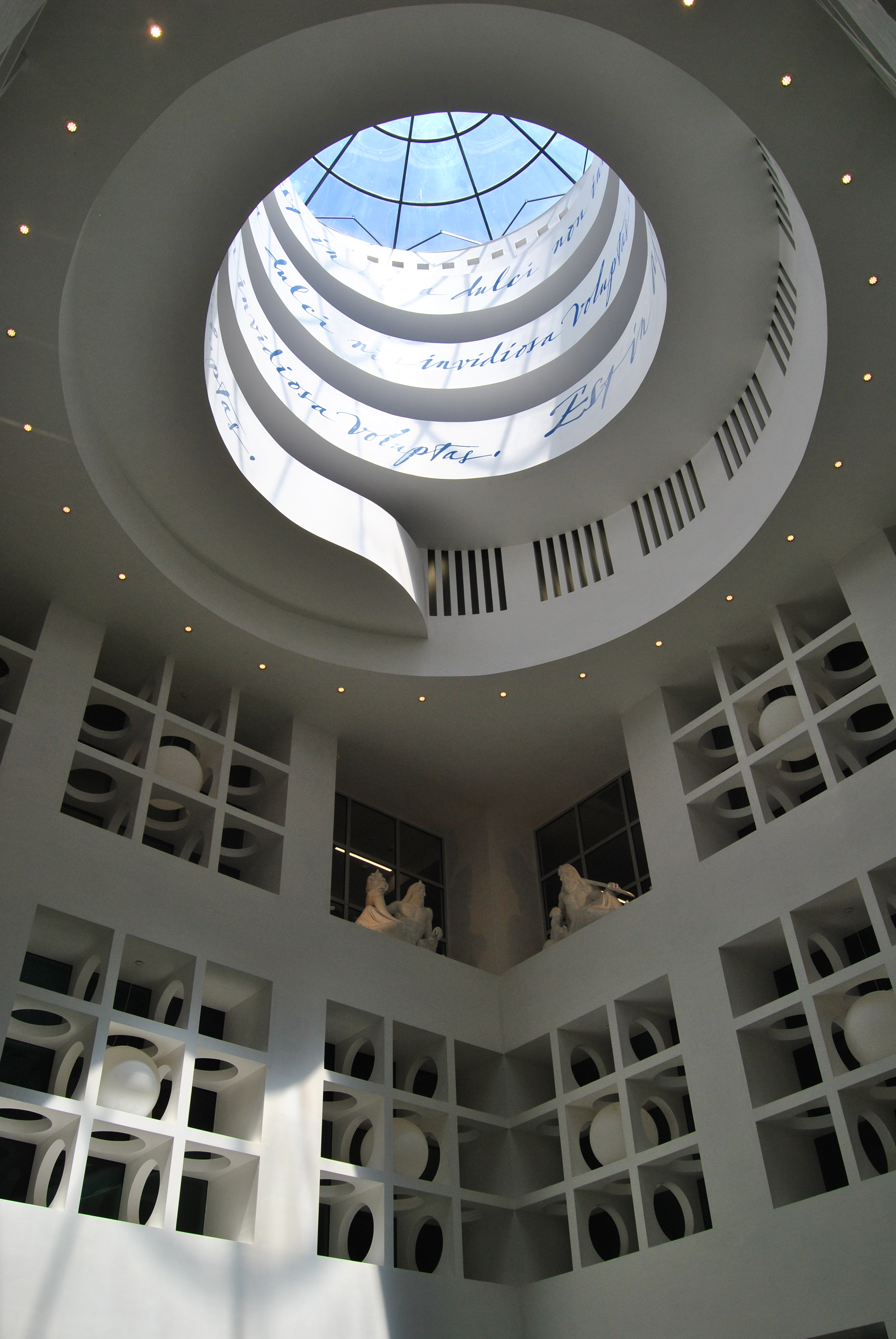
The dome

== See also ==
- List of Naples Metro stations
