= Arco Mirelli station =

Metro station in Naples, Italy

Coordinates: 40°49′56″N 14°13′34″E

Arco Mirelli
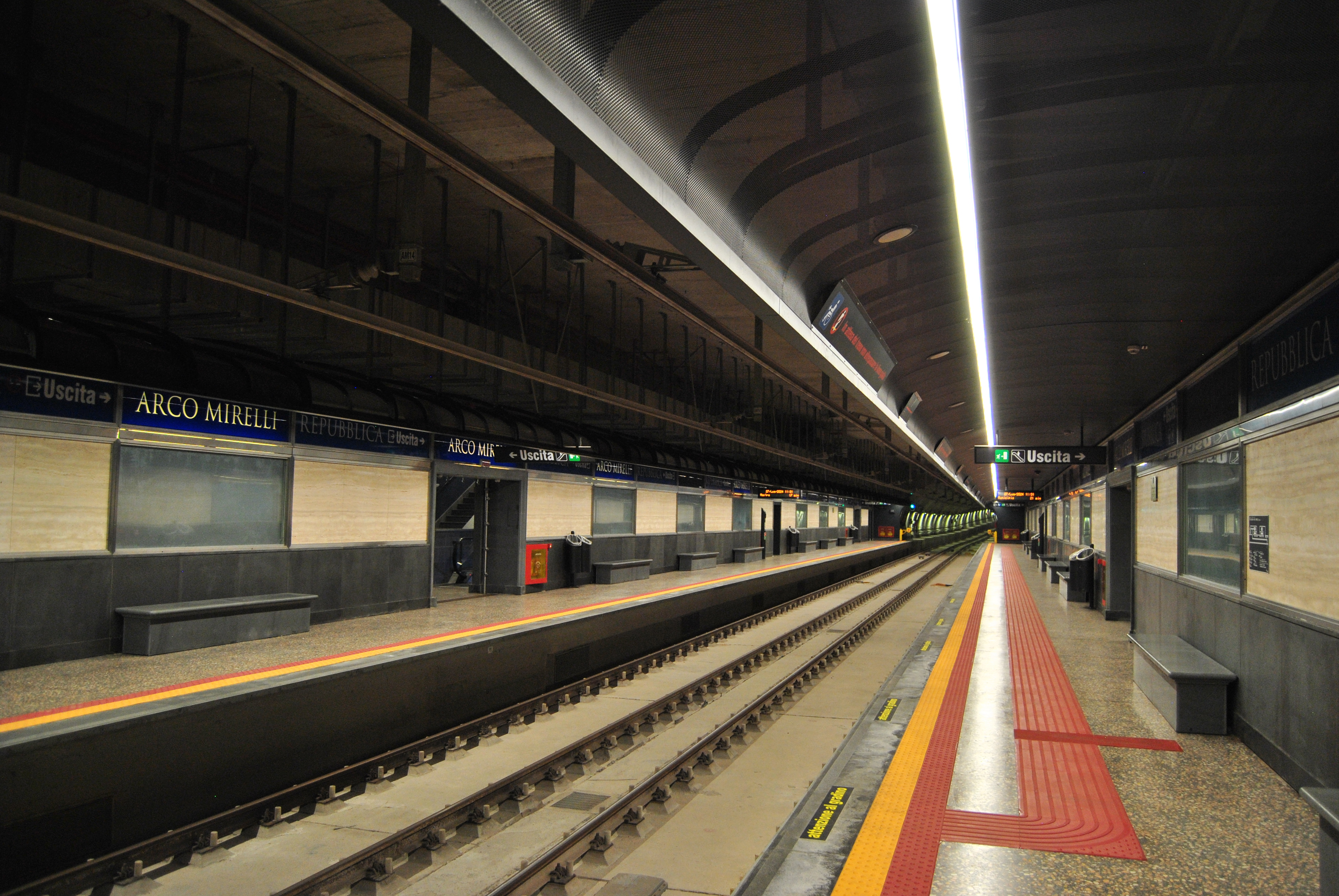

General information
- Location: Piazza della Repubblica, Naples
- System: Naples Metro station
- Operator: ANM
- Line: Line 6
- Connections: Urban and suburban buses

Construction
- Structure type: Underground

Other information
- Status: In use

History
- Opened: 17 July 2024

Services
Preceding station	Naples Metro	Following station
San Pasquale towards Municipio	Line 6	Mergellina towards Mostra
Route map
Location

Arco Mirelli is an underground metro station that serves Line 6 on the Naples Metro. The Arco Mirelli station, designed by the architect Hans Kollhoff, serves the areas of Via Caracciolo, the Villa Comunale (within which there is the Anton Dohrn Zoological Station), and the eastern part of the district Mergellina.

== See also ==
- List of Naples Metro stations
