= Line 6 (Naples Metro) =

Light metro line in Naples, Italy

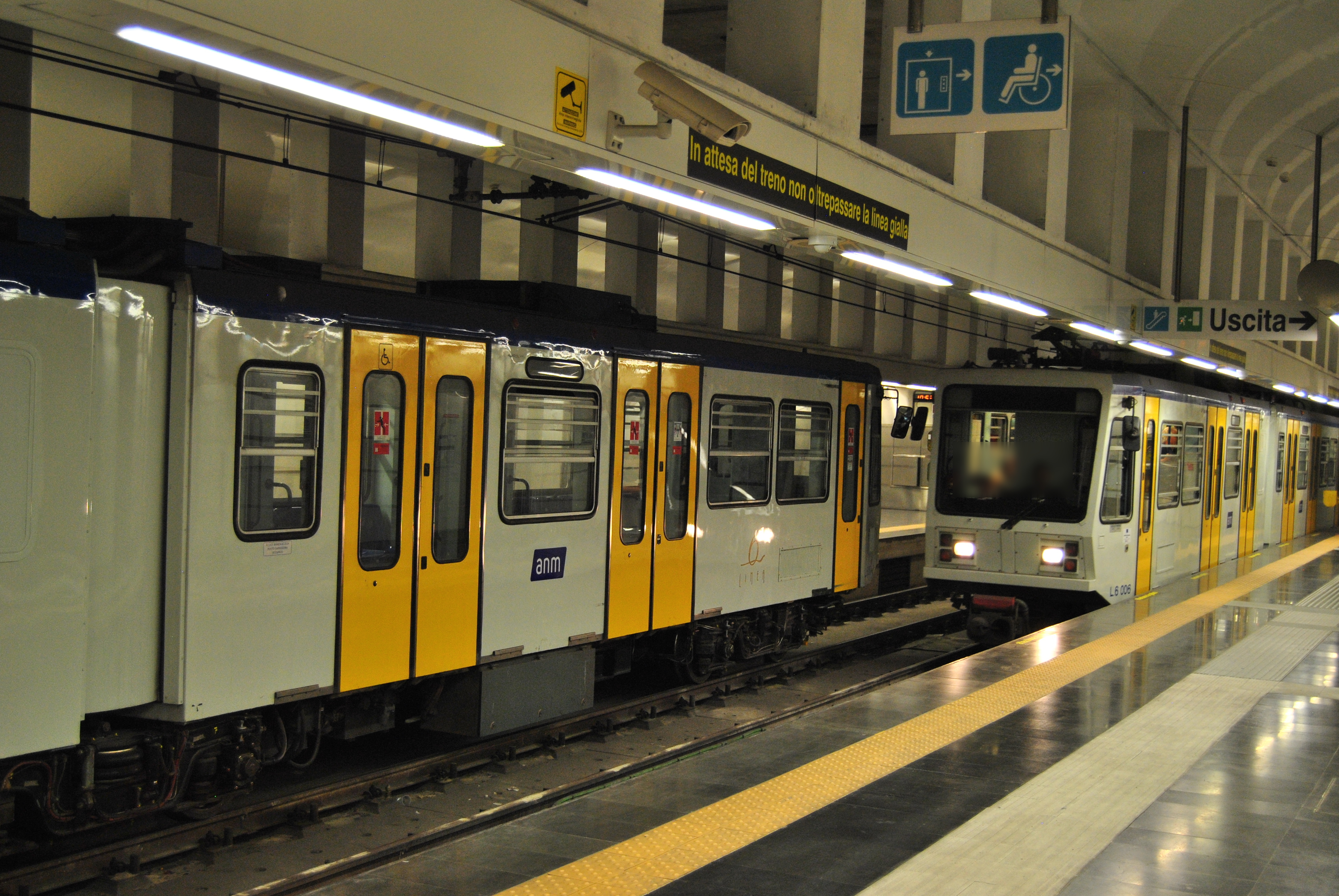
- Trains at Mostra in 2024.

Overview
- Locale: Naples, Campania, Italy
- Termini: Municipio; Mostra
- Connecting lines: Lines 1, 2
- Stations: 8
- Website: www.metropolitanadinapoli.it/linea-6-metropolitana-di-napoli/

Service
- Type: Light metro
- System: Naples Metro
- Operator: ANM
- Depot: Campegna Depot
- Rolling stock: Firema T 67, Hitachi Rail

History
- Opened: 4 February 2007; 19 years ago
- Last extension: 2024
- Closed: 2013
- Reopened: 17 July 2024

Technical
- Line length: 5.5 km (3.4 mi)
- Character: Deep level
- Track gauge: 1,435 mm (4 ft 8 1/2 in) standard gauge
- Electrification: 1,500 V DC overhead catenary
Route map

Line 6 (Italian: Linea 6; Italian pronunciation: [ˈliːneːa ˈsɛi]) is a Naples Metro line that runs from Municipio in southeast Naples to Mostra in south-west Naples. Printed in blue on the map, it serves 8 underground stations, over 5.5 kilometres (3.4 mi). A light metro line, it is operated by ANM.

== History ==
What was to become Line 6 was originally planned as a rapid tramway line (Linea Tranviaria Rapida, LTR) with some below ground tracts. Works started in the late 1980s. The first section was planned to be opened for the 1990 FIFA World Cup. Since the Mergellina terminal station could not be completed in time the line was not opened and was left unused for many years.

In the 2000s it was decided to complete the Mergellina station and to open the section that had already been built, but as a light metro without any connection with the tram network. The section was opened on 4 February 2007 from the Mostra to the Mergellina stations with two intermediate stations at Lala and Augusto and a frequency of a train every 8 minutes.

Since the existing section was very short and the area was already served by other parallel lines, (Line 2 and Cumana), the line was underused. The service was suspended on 10 March 2011 and was later re-opened with a reduced frequency and only in the morning from Mondays to Fridays.

The line was run by Metronapoli until November 2013, when the operation of the Naples Metro was taken over by Azienda Napoletana Mobilità SpA (ANM).

In July 2006, preliminary work on extending Line 6 towards Piazza Municipio, where work on the Line 1 station was already under way, began. In September 2007, Ansaldo STS was awarded a €426m contract for the 3.1-kilometre (1.9 mi) Mergellina–Municipio section.

Only six years after opening, the line began what became an 11-year closure. Initially, the closure resulted from a building collapse in 2013 that affected the tunnel, then continued during work to extend the underground line from Mergellina eastwards to Municipio. It reopened with the new section to Municipio on 17 July 2024 (with a ceremonial inauguration on 16 July).

=== Expansion ===
In 2009, an extension to Bagnoli was planned, with intermediate stops at Campegna, Acciaieria, Città della Scienza, and Porta del Parco. In 2014, Invitalia, which took over as the implementing body for the cleanup of the ex-ILVA area, presented a modification to the project. The new plan proposed the extension of the line to Coroglio, near the island of Nisida, with intermediate stops at Campegna, Neghelli, and Acciaieria.

In 2022, a branch line was planned from the future Campegna station to the Posillipo neighborhood, with a stop in the caverns of Piazza San Luigi and an elevator connection to the overlying Via Francesco Petrarca.

On 30 March 2023, the Municipality of Naples issued the call for tenders for the final and executive design of the two extensions: Campegna-Nisida and Campegna-Posillipo.

== Route ==
Line 6 (Naples Metro)

Station	Image	Opened	Notes
Municipio Porto		2024	Interchange with Line 1 and Naples tramway network
Chiaia Monte di Dio		2024	
San Pasquale		2024	
Arco Mirelli		2024	
Mergellina		2007	Interchange with Line 2
Lala		2007	
Augusto		2007	
Mostra		2007	Interchange with Line 2 and Cumana railway (Line 4)

== Service ==
The frequency of Line 6 is one train every 14 minutes. It operates between 7:10am and 9:10pm weekdays, and 7:10am and 2:50pm on weekends

== See also ==
- Naples Metro
- List of Naples Metro stations
- Art Stations of the Naples Metro
- List of metro systems

== Bibliography ==
- Guido Mazzuolo: La linea tranviaria rapida a Napoli. Sintesi del progetto. In: ″Ingegneria Ferroviaria″, October 1984, p. 680–685.
- Riccardo Carugati: Tram rapido a Napoli. In: ″I Treni Oggi″, July–August 1990, p. 31–33.
- Marcello Cruciani, Roberto Zannotti: ″Mondiale″ un anno dopo – 2. In: ″I Treni Oggi″ Nr. 117 (July–August 1991), p. 27–28.
