= Alfa Romeo Mille AF =

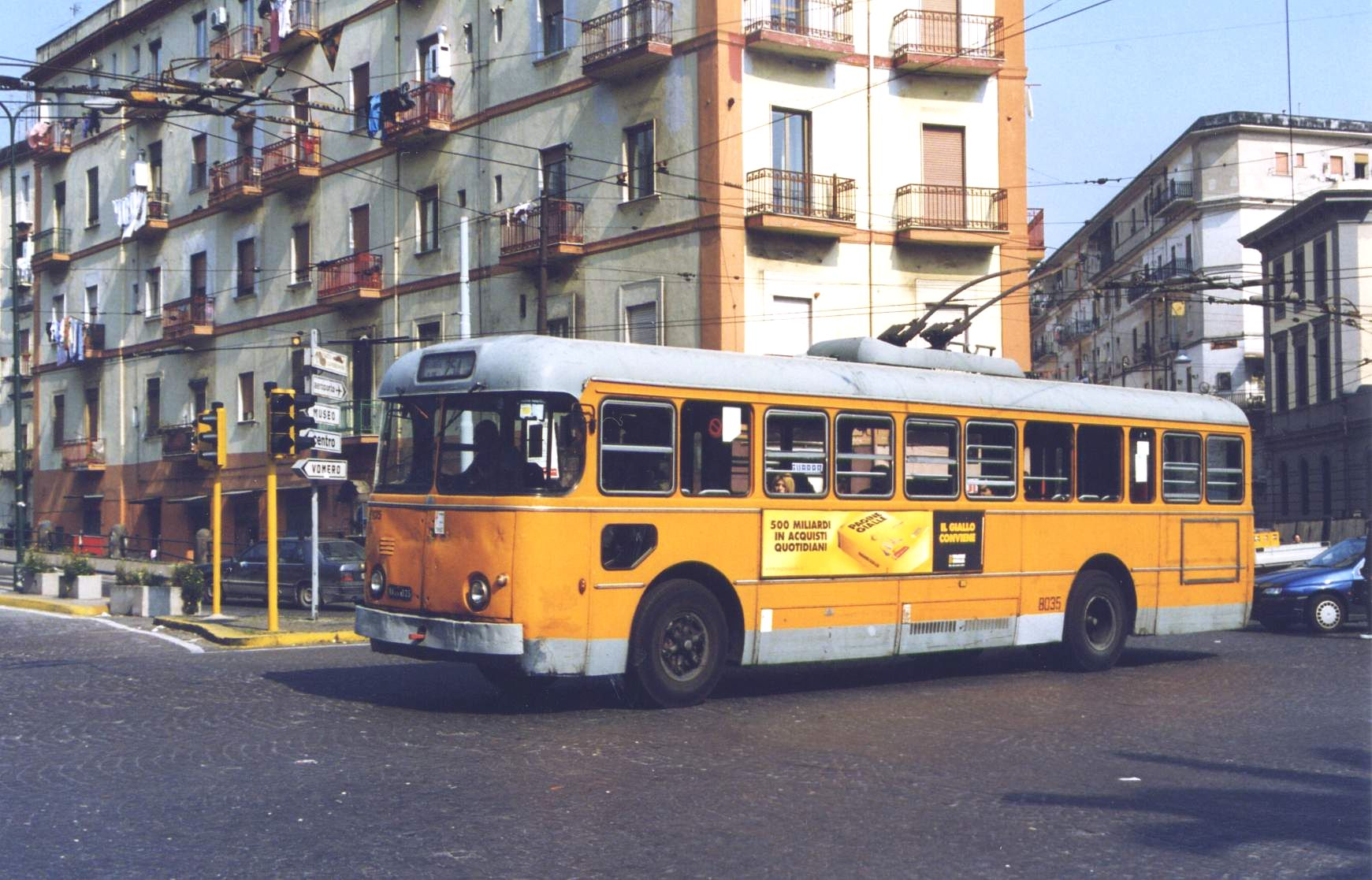
- An Alfa Romeo 1000 Aerfer trolleybus in service on the Naples ANM trolleybus system in 1999

Overview
- Manufacturer: Alfa Romeo (chassis), with other manufacturers for the body and electrical equipment
- Also called: Alfa Romeo 1000
- Production: 1959-1964

Powertrain
- Engine: 11,050 cc (674 cu in) diesel I6

Dimensions
- Length: 10.9 m (36 ft)

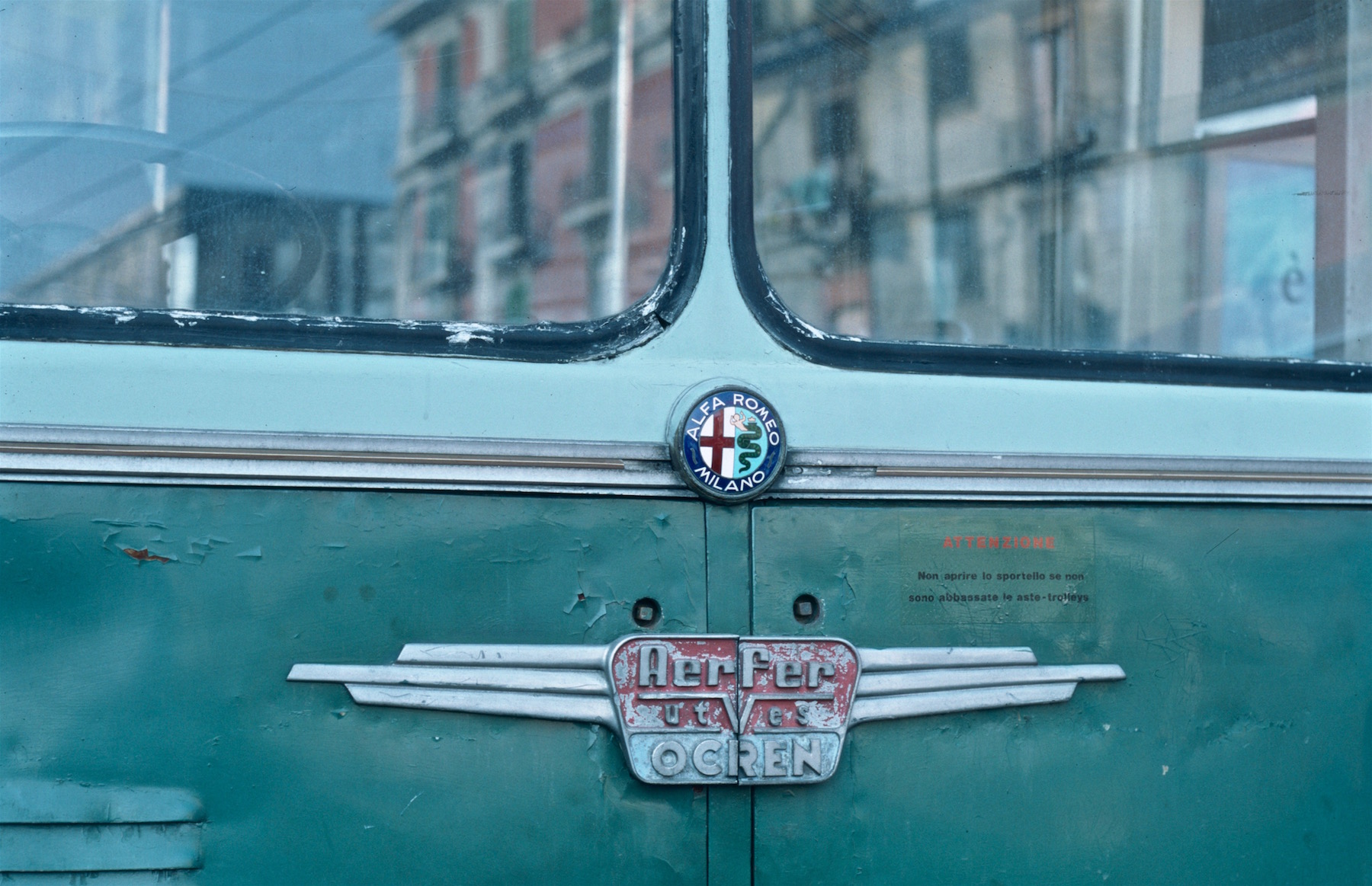
The Alfa Romeo logo and other manufacturers' nameplates on the front of a 1962 model-1000 trolleybus for CTP Napoli

The Alfa Romeo Mille (or Alfa Romeo 1000) is a trolleybus manufactured by Alfa Romeo.

== History ==
The model was produced from 1959 to 1964. The Mille had different versions. They were used in Italy, Uruguay and other countries. In Italy, most were used in Milan. The trolleybus had a special style and it is different from the past models of the company.

The last Alfa Romeo-built trolleybuses to operate in regular service anywhere were 1000F units on Naples' two independent trolleybus systems, the ANM and CTP systems. ANM's last three were withdrawn at end of February or first few days of March 2001, while CTP's last few Alfa Romeo Mille units (from series 11–36, built in 1962) were withdrawn in December 2004, by which time they were the oldest trolleybuses in service in Western Europe.

== Technical characteristics ==
The bus was powered by an 11,050 cc (674 cu in) Alfa Romeo 1607 or 1610 inline-six diesel engine, which produced 165 horsepower at 2000 RPM. The 84 trolleybuses delivered to ATAN in Naples in 1961–62 had electrical equipment by OCREN (Officine Costruzioni Riparazioni Elettromeccaniche Napoletane SpA) and OCREN-Sécheron L 336 C motors.

== Body ==
The trolleybus used bodies from Casaro, SEAC, or other manufacturers, depending on the choice of the transport company making the purchase.

== Production ==
- 1000AF – including 26 for the Naples TPN (now CTP) system in 1962
- 1000F/Pd – including 84 units for the Naples ATAN (later ANM) system in 1961–62 and 40 units for the Milan trolleybus system, in 1963–64
- 10P - 30 units
- AU7 - 85 units

== See also ==
- List of buses
