= Trolleybuses in Naples =

Transit system in Campania, Italy

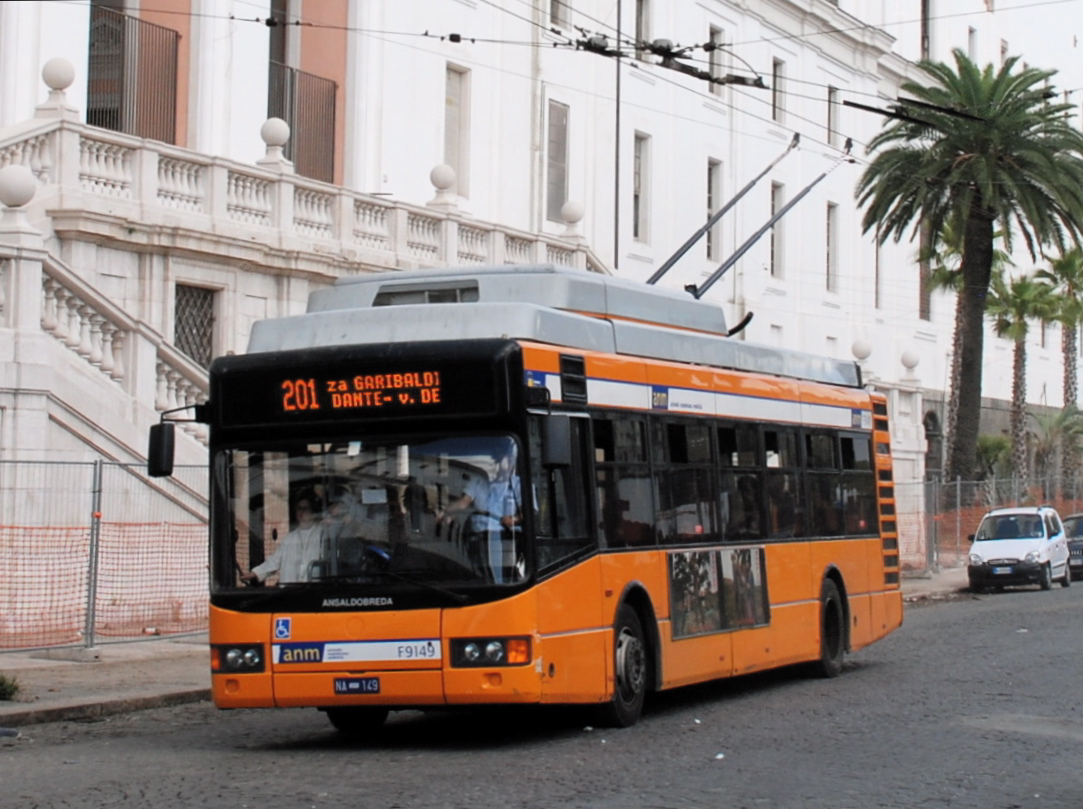
- An AnsaldoBreda F19 of ANM at Piazza Carlo III

Operation
- Locale: Naples, Campania, Italy
- Open: ANM (ex-ATAN) system: 8 May 1940; CTP (ex-TPN) system: January 1964
- Close: ANM: Not applicable (still operating); CTP: 6 August 2015 (suspended indefinitely; CTP was subsequently dissolved, in 2022)
- Routes: ANM: Currently 4 (2023); formerly multiple; CTP: Formerly 3 (of which not more than 2 in operation simultaneously)
- Owners: ANM (Naples); CTP (Naples)
- Operator: same as owners

Infrastructure
- Electrification: 750 V DC overhead lines (both systems)

Statistics
Overview

Trolleybuses in Naples (Italian: Rete filoviaria di Napoli) provide a portion of the public transport service in the city and comune of Naples, in the region of Campania, southern Italy. From 1964 to 2015, two independent trolleybus systems were in operation, both publicly owned, but only that of Azienda Napoletana Mobilità (ANM) remains in operation. The ANM system opened in 1940, whereas the smaller trolleybus network of Compagnia Trasporti Pubblici di Napoli (CTP) opened in 1964.

CTP was dissolved in 2022 as a result of longstanding financial difficulties, and the last trolleybus operation on that system occurred in August 2015. Its trolleybus route was transferred to AIR Mobilità, but AIR has not reinstated the long-suspended trolleybus service, and this does not appear to be planned.

As of 2023, the ANM trolleybus system has four routes. Until the closure of the CTP system, Naples had been (since 2006) one of only two metropolitan areas possessing two independent trolleybus systems, the other being São Paulo, Brazil.

== History ==
The first trolleybus service in Naples was inaugurated on 8 May 1940 by Azienda Tranvie Autofilovie Napoli (English: Tramway-Trolleybus Company of Naples) (ATAN), which also operated the urban tram system. At its maximum extent, the ATAN system had 31 trolleybus routes (albeit, counting many shortworkings and variations with overlapping sections). ATAN was reorganised in 1995 as the Azienda Napoletana Mobilità (ANM).

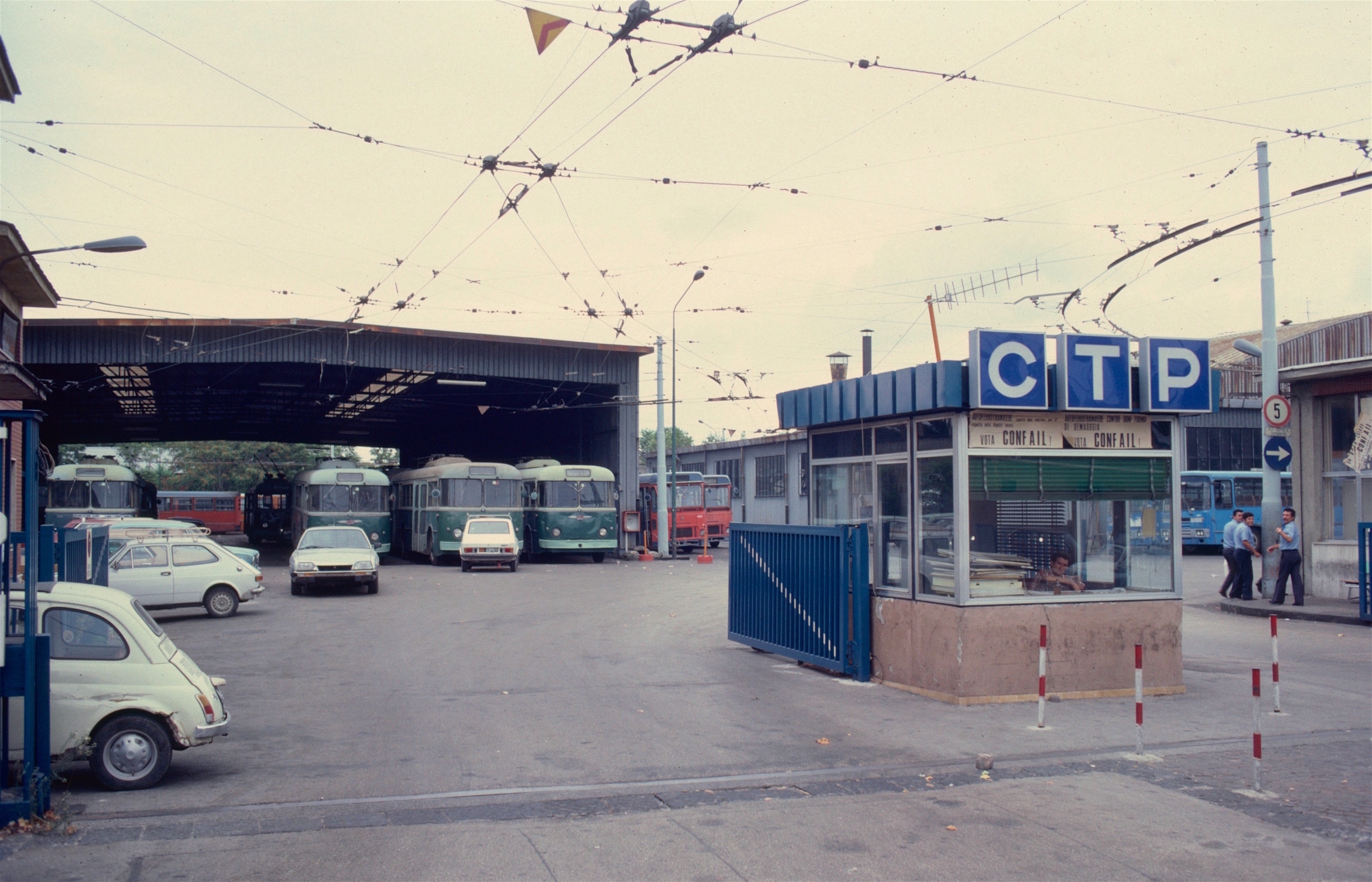
The Maddalena Depot of CTP (and previously TPN) in 1983. It closed in 1999, and the fleet was moved.

The Tranvie Provinciali di Napoli (TPN), a separate company that operated suburban buses and a suburban tramway, opened the second trolleybus network in Naples on 26 January 1964 on a route connecting central Naples with Piazzale della Libertà in Secondigliano. This unnumbered route was extended by several kilometres to Aversa in 1967, after which time the TPN system was often referred to as the "Naples–Aversa" trolleybus system in transport publications. In 1978, TPN was reorganised as the Consorzio Trasporti Pubblici di Napoli (CTP), renamed in 2001 to Compagnia Trasporti Pubblici di Napoli (still CTP). The routes were given numbers in the early 1980s, the two routes at that time being M13 (Naples – Aversa) and M15 (Naples – Secondigliano/Rione 167). The M prefix stood for Maddalena depot (also known as Doganella depot, located on Viale Maddalena in Naples), TPN's/CTP's only trolleybus depot/garage for many years. That depot closed in 1999, and after two years of temporary accommodation in leased facilities, CTP's trolleybuses moved to Teverola depot in 2001, but the trolleybus routes retained their longstanding M prefix to avoid confusion among riders.

All of the overhead trolley wiring in central Naples is owned by ANM, the limit of the CTP-owned wiring being the southwest end of Via Don Bosco (just east of Piazza Carlo III). However, CTP trolleybuses were allowed to operate through to Piazza Garibaldi (along Corso Garibaldi), powered from ANM-owned wires, under a longstanding agreement between the two public agencies.

== Current services ==
Five of the eight trolleybus routes operating in 2008 were suburban routes, connecting Naples with other municipalities, while the other three (routes 201–203) were operating entirely within Naples proper. As of 2021, CTP route M13 and ANM route 254 are the only suburban routes remaining, with route 255 having closed and other ANM routes being indefinitely suspended, while urban routes 201, 202 and 204 in operation.

The following ANM trolleybus routes are operating in 2023:

- 201 Piazza Carlo III – Piazza Cavour – Via Medina
- 202 Piazza G.B. Vico – Piazza Garibaldi – Via Medina
- 204 Ospedale Cardarelli – Capodimonte – Via Depretis
- 254 Naples/Via Nicolini (Ponti Rossi) – Portici (Piazza Poli) (terminus known as Bellavista until 2001)

On the CTP trolleybus system (transferred AIR Mobilità in 2022), no routes remain in operation, and the last day of service was 6 August 2015. After mid-2012, the CTP system had only one trolleybus route, route M13 from Naples (Via Casanova) to Aversa and Teverola. Since August 2015, it was operated solely by diesel buses–initially temporarily but this situation remained unchanged when CTP was dissolved in April 2022 and its trolleybus route transferred to AIR, which has not reinstated trolleybus operation on the route.

== ANM route history ==
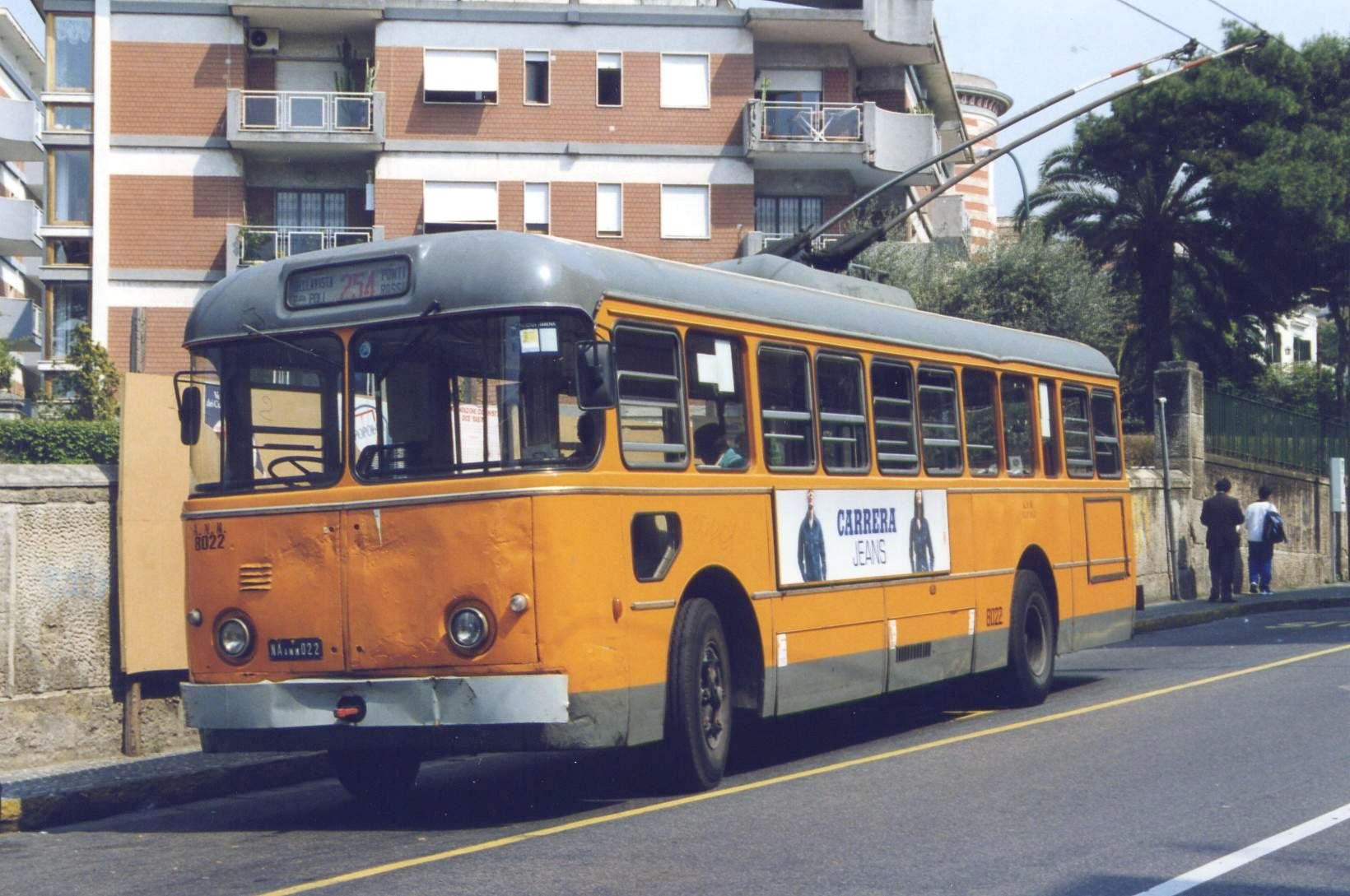
A 1961 Alfa Romeo trolleybus laying over at the Bellavista terminus of route 254, a terminus now known as Piazza Poli. ANM's last Alfa Romeo trolleybuses were withdrawn in early 2001.

=== 21st century ===
In 2009, ANM was operating the following six trolleybus routes:

- 201 Piazza Carlo III – Piazza Cavour – Via Medina/Piazza Municipio
- 202 Piazza G.B. Vico – Piazza Garibaldi – Via Medina
- 203 Parcheggio Brin – Piazza Cavour/Via Broggia (temporarily suspended)
- 254 Naples/Via Nicolini (Ponti Rossi) – Portici (Piazza Poli) (terminus known as Bellavista until 2001)
- 255 Naples/Piazza Carlo III – Torre del Greco
- 256 Naples/Piazza Garibaldi* – San Giorgio a Cremano

* = (extended to Piazza Municipio in September 2009)

Route 203 was the newest route, having opened on 2 September 2009. Routes 201 and 202 opened in 2004 and 2006, respectively. The three then-surviving suburban routes were much older; routes 254 and 255 opened in January 1962 and route 256 in May 1963.

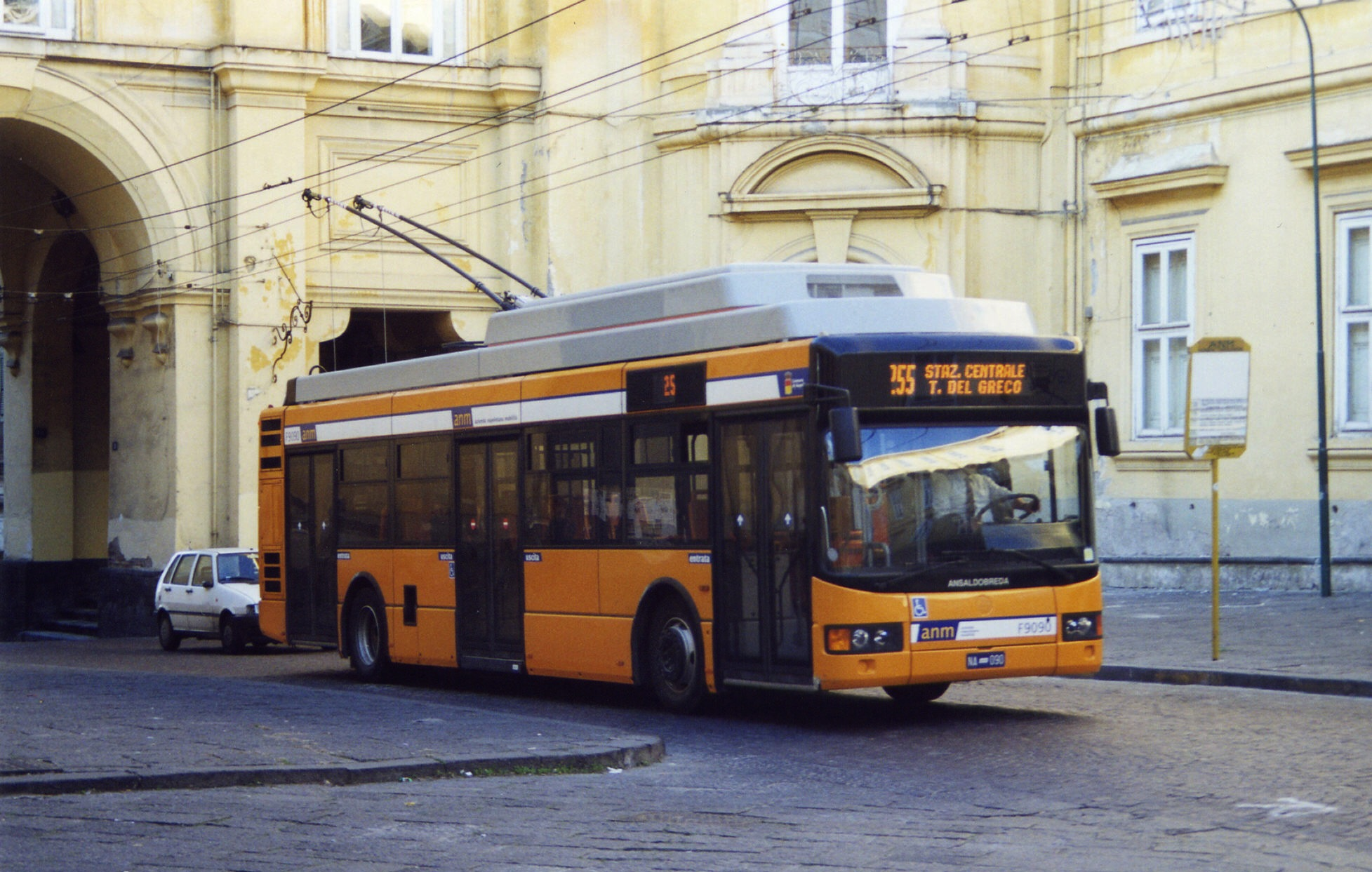
An AnsaldoBreda trolleybus on route 255 passing the Palazzo Reale (Palace of Portici) in 2000. Service on this section of route 255 ended in 2009.

In September 2009, service on the outer half of route 255, between Portici and Torre del Greco, was replaced by a motorbus shuttle route that was planned to be temporary, because of road work in Ercolano. The temporary route was numbered 655, and trolleybus service on route 255 was limited to Piazza San Ciro in Portici, as temporary route 255-barrata (255/). However, in 2014, ANM announced that trolleybus service on the 4-km outer section of route 255 would not be reinstated after all, and that route 255 (and 255/) were permanently closed, effective November 2014. The reason given was that the municipality of Ercolano had changed the traffic flow on one of the streets route 255 had used, the section of Corso Resina between Via Roma and Via IV Novembre, from two-way to one-way eastbound, but that Ercolano had declined to provide any funding for new trolleybus overhead wiring along the new westbound routing. Route 255, which at around 13 km had been ANM's longest trolleybus route, was replaced by ANM bus route 155.

Meanwhile, starting April 2012 route 256 was cut back from San Giorgio a Cremano to Croce Lagno in western Portici and renamed 256-barrata (256/), due to unstable buildings along the route in San Giorgio needing repair. This was due to be temporary, until the buildings are repaired, but route 256-barrata, too, was suspended in April 2016; in its shortened form (terminating at Croce Lagno), it was effectively only a short-working of route 254.

Route 203 was suspended indefinitely in May 2016, due to road work, leaving routes 201, 202 and 254 as the only ANM trolleybus routes in operation, and plans to reinstate route 203 were later dropped.

On 25 June 2021, trolleybus route 204 (Via Depretis-Piazza Museo Nazionale-Cardarelli Hospital) was opened, replacing bus line 604 (numbered R4 until July 2018), restoring the total number of routes in operation to four. It includes one section along Corso Amedeo di Savoia, around 200 metres long, that is not equipped with overhead trolley wires, and the trolleybuses must traverse it using their auxiliary diesel engines.

== CTP route history ==
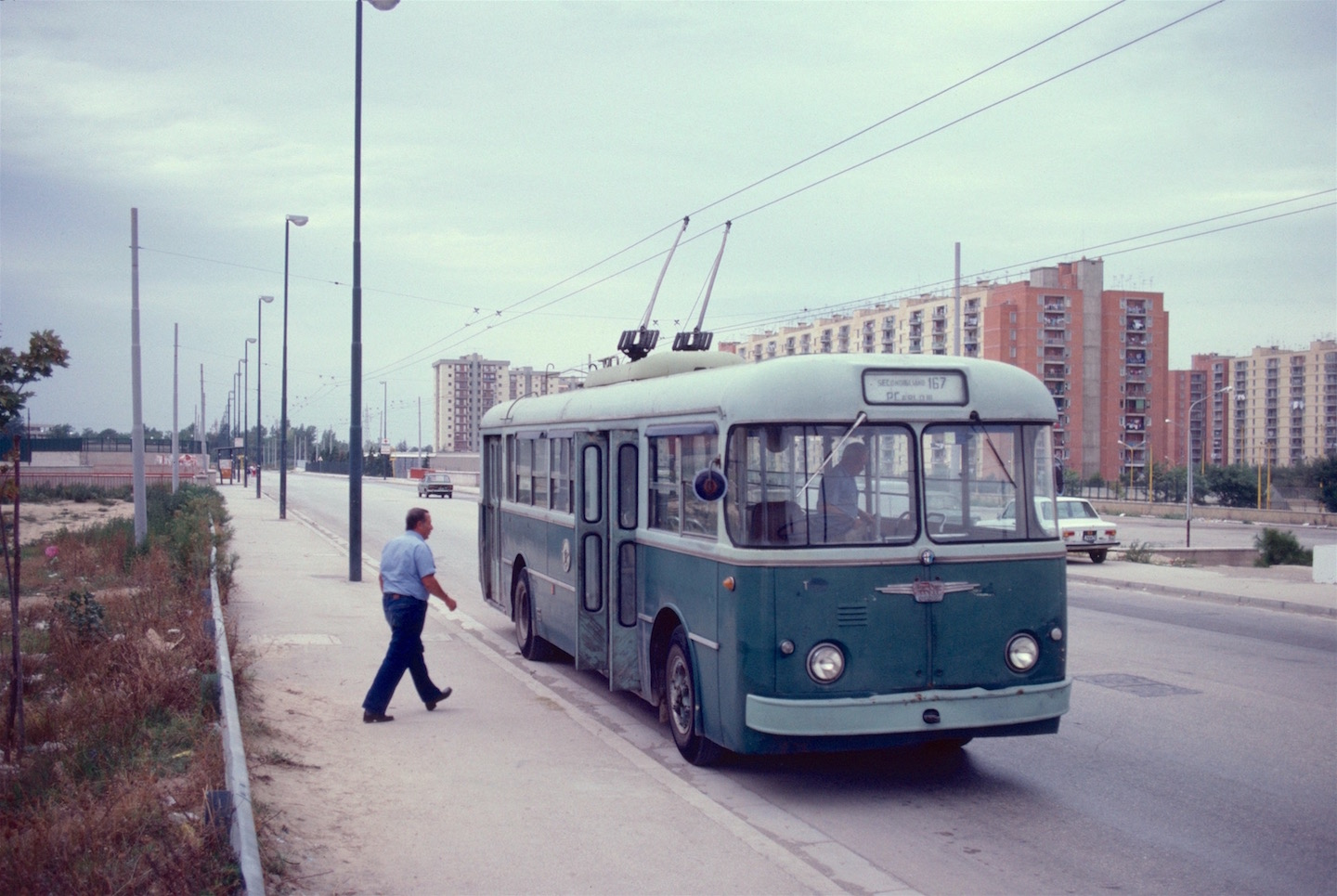
An Alfa Romeo trolleybus on CTP route M15 in Secondigliano in 1983

The first trolleybus line of CTP's predecessor, TPN, opened in January 1964, connecting central Naples with Piazzale della Libertà in Secondigliano. This unnumbered route was extended by several kilometres to Aversa in 1967. The wiring to Piazzale della Libertà then effectively became a short branch off of the main CTP trolleybus route. In July 1980, that branch was extended to a developing high-rise residential area in Secondigliano known as Rione 167. TPN was reorganized as CTP in 1978. In the early 1980s, the two routes were assigned numbers for the first time, M13 being the Naples–Aversa route and M15 being the Naples–Secondigliano–Rione 167 route.

=== 21st century ===
As of 2008, the CTP system had two trolleybus routes:

- M11 Metro line 1's Piscinola Scampia station – Aversa – Teverola
- M13 Naples/Piazza Garibaldi (Napoli Centrale railway station) – Aversa – Teverola

Route M13 was extended from Aversa to Teverola in December 2001, and route M15 (Naples–Secondigliano) was withdrawn at that time. With a one-way length of approximately 22 km, route M13 is the longest trolleybus route in western Europe. All of the wiring of route M15 that was unique to that route remains in place. Route M11 began operation in June 2005, but did not require any new wiring; its 2 km section closest to Piscinola metro station was not equipped with overhead wires, and the trolleybuses serving the route used their auxiliary diesel engines along that section, while the remainder of the route used overhead wiring already in place for route M13.

At an unknown date no later than spring 2011, route M13 was cut back in central Naples from Piazza Garibaldi to Via Casanova, which had previously been its terminus from 2001 to 2005.

Route M11 was withdrawn in spring 2011, as part of a group of service reductions, leaving CTP with only one trolleybus route:

- M13 Naples/Via Casanova – Aversa – Teverola

Service on route M13 had long been a mix of trolleybuses and motorbuses, and use of trolleybuses was intermittent in the 2010s, due to a succession of road projects or other disruptions along the route. The route became fully motorbus-operated in 2013 (indefinitely). Trolleybus service resumed around spring 2015, but the resumption was short-lived. All trolleybus service was again temporarily suspended on 6 August 2015, following an accident in which an overheight truck tore down around 500 m (1,600 ft) of overhead trolleybus wiring south of Capodichino. Some repair work on the overhead wires was undertaken, but trolleybus service remained suspended in 2020. Some new trolleybus wiring was installed at CTP's Teverola depot in August 2016.

However, because of several financial problems with which the company had been struggling for years, all CTP service – trolleybus and motorbus – was suspended on 20 December 2021, and in April 2022 CTP was dissolved altogether, as the result of a court ruling that Trolleybus Magazine reported "found CTP to be insolvent and without any realistic plans that would substantially improve its economic situation, which included debt that had grown to as much as 98 million euros". Its routes and vehicles were transferred to two other public transport companies owned by the Region of Campania, AIR Mobilità and EAV, with the trolleybus route M13 going to AIR. Along with some other former CTP routes, AIR reinstated service on former route M13 on 2 May 2022 but using only motorbuses. Route M13 was renumbered "02-NA" on 1 August 2022, but trolleybus service remained suspended. In May 2023, it was reported that most of the former CTP trolleybuses – the newest vehicles – were being sold at auction, and this development and other evidence (including the poor condition of the overhead wiring) indicated that a reopening of the former CTP trolleybus system under AIR appears unlikely.

== Planned expansion (21st century) ==
Plans to electrify ANM route R4 (later renumbered 604) were already in place in 2005, construction began in 2011, and the route opened in 2021 as new trolleybus route 204. Also being planned in 2005 was the conversion to trolleybuses of ANM bus route C47, now 147 (Piazza G.B. Vico – Piazza Medaglie d'Oro), which in effect would have been a restoration of former trolleybus route 247 (closed in 1973). However, this plan for route C47 was cancelled in 2010. In the relatively recent past (in 2000), ANM also had plans to restore trolleybus routes 253 (Naples – Ercolano) and 257 (Naples – Bellavista – Ercolano), which previously operated until the mid-1980s and from 1973–76, respectively, but whose disused wiring was retained for many years. However, those plans have been dropped, and the disused wiring was removed in 2004.

Another proposal for a new trolleybus route has been under study, off and on, for some years:

- R5 Parcheggio Brin – MN1 Piscinola/Scampìa station (new route, presumably to be renumbered 205)

== Fleets ==
- ANM: 87 AnsaldoBreda F19 (built 1999–2002), numbered F9079-F9165
- CTP (as of 2008): 3 AnsaldoBreda F19, nos. 101–103 (built 2000); and 10 Solaris-Ganz Trollino (built 2004), nos. 121–130

All 100 vehicles are equipped with diesel engines to allow limited operation away from the overhead wires.

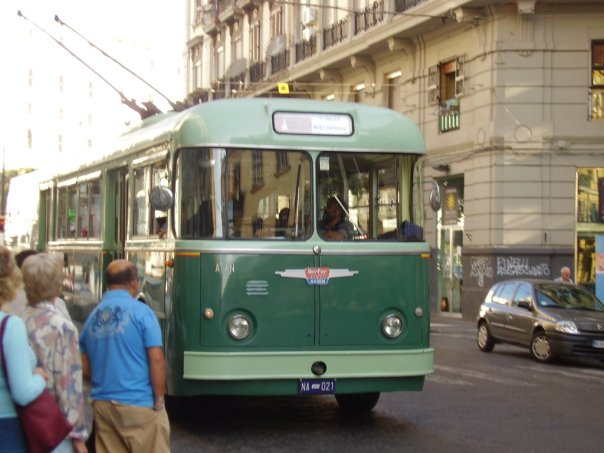
Restored 1961 Alfa Romeo trolleybus 8021 on a special excursion in 2009

ANM's fleet also includes one preserved historic trolleybus, a 1961-built Alfa Romeo 1000F trolleybus, No. 8021. ANM's modern, low-floor AnsaldoBreda trolleybuses began to enter service in October 2000, replacing Alfa Romeo vehicles, and the last of the latter were withdrawn in early March 2001. The agency preserved three of them (nos. 8021, 8038 and 8306). No. 8021 was fully restored to historic condition and livery in 2003. It is not used for normal service, but operates occasionally on special excursions, and on certain summer Sundays it runs in public service on a special city-centre-only loop route to promote awareness of public transport's positive role in helping to preserve the environment. The power supply of the ANM system was raised in 2001–03 from 600 volts to 750 V, but No. 8021's motors have not been modified to allow it to operate at the higher voltage. On days when the historic trolleybus is operated, the voltage of the entire trolleybus system must be temporarily reduced to 600 V. The modern AnsaldoBreda vehicles are able to operate at either voltage.

== Depots ==
Since 2017, the only trolleybus depot on the ANM system is Carlo III depot, located on Via B. Tanucci north of Piazza Carlo III. However, for a much longer period, from April 1979 to 2017, ANM's (and predecessor ATAN's) only trolleybus depot was Stella Polare depot—although by the 2000s ANM had begun to store some trolleybuses at its Carlo III and Via Ferraris bus depots, where they used their diesel engines to enter and exit because those depots were not equipped with overhead wiring. (Stella Polare depot was large enough to accommodate only 70 of the 87 AnsaldoBreda F19 trolleybuses buil in 1999–2002 and delivered in 2000–06, and for this reason, 12 had remained stored at the builder's factory in Pistoia until at least 2004.) By 2019, some overhead wiring had been installed inside Carlo III depot, but there was still no wiring connecting the depot wires to the wires (for route 202) on the street passing in front of it.

CTP had several depots for its mostly motorbus fleet, but since 1999 the only one equipped for trolleybuses was Teverola depot, which was built in 1994 and in December 2001 became the outer terminus of route M13.

== See also ==
- Trams in Naples
- Metropolitana di Napoli
- List of trolleybus systems in Italy
