= Trams in Naples =

Naples tramway network
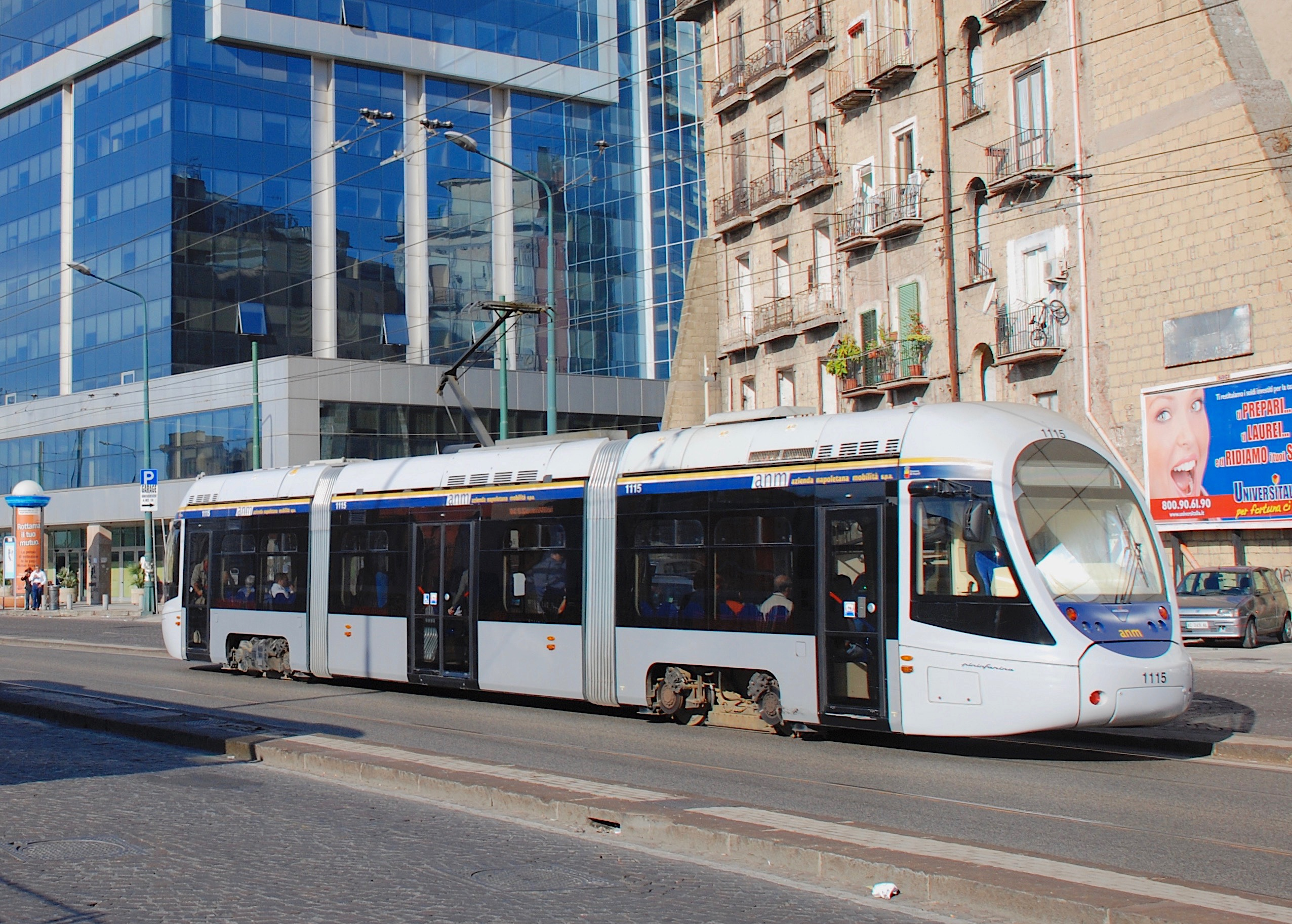
- A Sirio tram in Naples

Operation
- Locale: Naples, Campania, Italy
- Open: 1875
- Routes: 3
- Operator: ANM (Naples)

Infrastructure
- Track gauge: 1,435 mm (4 ft 8 1/2 in)
- Electrification: 600 V DC

Statistics
- Route length: 11.8 km (7.3 mi)
Overview
- Website: http://www.anm.it/ ANM (in Italian)

The Naples tramway network (Italian: Rete tranviaria di Napoli) is located within the city and comune of Naples, in the region of Campania, southern Italy. In operation since 1875, the network has waxed and waned in size and vitality over the years, and is now growing once again. It is now 11.8 km (7.3 mi) long, and comprises three routes, known as lines 1, 2 and 4.

== History ==
The first tramways in Naples were horsecar lines, opened in 1875.

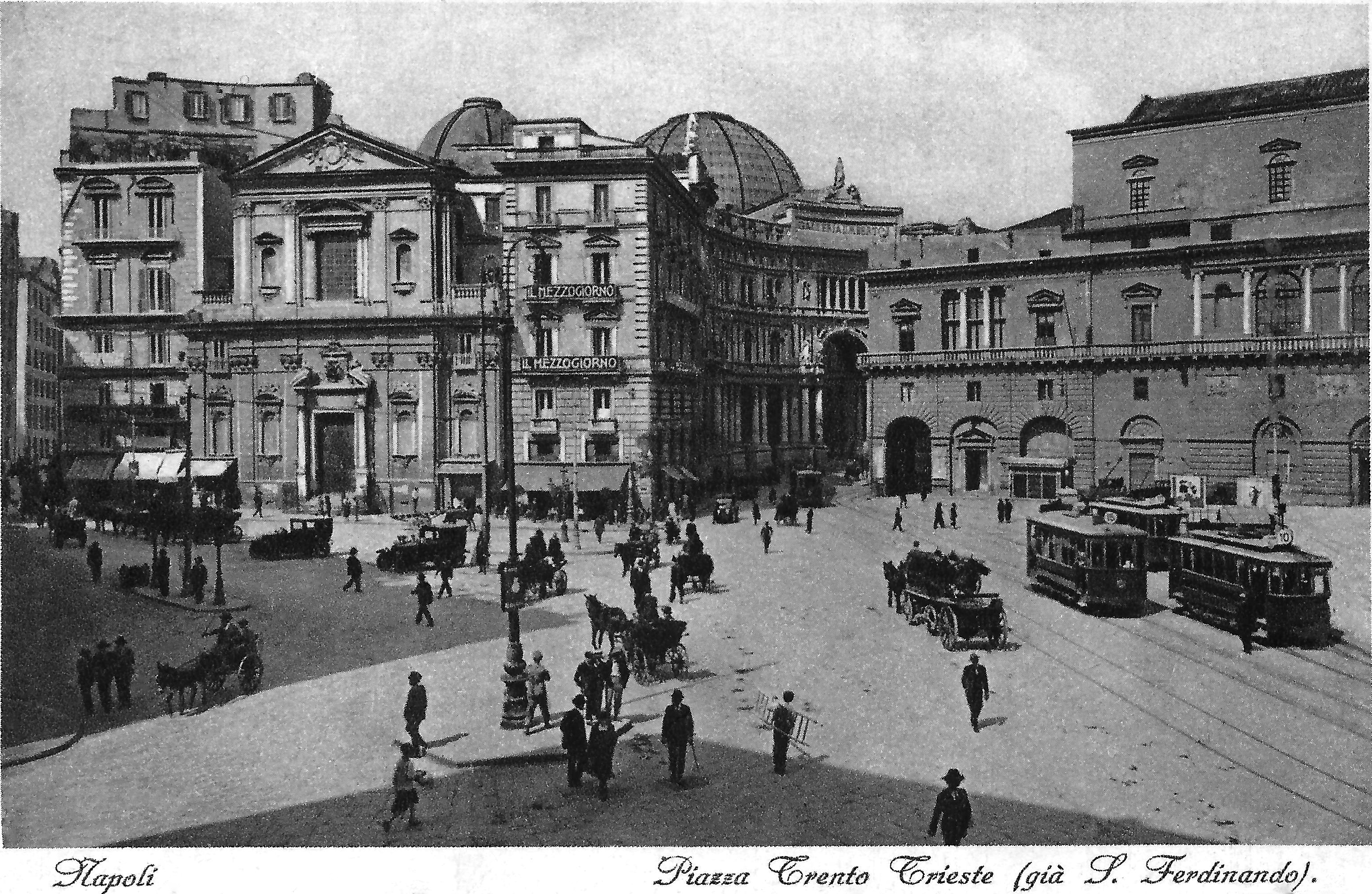
Trams in the 1920s

In 1929, the city of Naples rescued various lines, rolling stock and infrastructure from several concessionaires, before merging them all into the Azienda Tranviaria Comunale Napoli (English: Naples Municipal Tramway) (ACTN), which had been established in 1918.

In December 1930, the management of the network was entrusted to the Ente Autonomo Volturno (EAV), a local public sector producer of electricity. In 1937, the EAV became the concessionaire of the service, but due to various difficulties the city council resumed direct management from 1 January 1941, at the request of the concessionaire.

In 1947, the Azienda Tranvie Autofilovie Napoli (English: Tramway Trolleybus Company of Naples) (ATAN) was established to take over the management of tram services. As in other Italian cities, the tramway network underwent a drastic reduction between 1952 and 1954 in favour of trolleybus lines, and motor vehicles.

Attempts in the late twentieth century to revive what was left of the network, such as the Linea Tranviaria Rapida designed for the 1990 FIFA World Cup, did not lead to any results. Instead, the network suffered further cuts (1998: Piazzale Tecchio–Bagnoli; 2000: Piazza Vittoria–Piazzale Tecchio).

A rebuilding program has been launched. The program includes the reconstruction of some infrastructure, and renewal of the tram fleet.

== Services ==
The Naples tramway network is 11.8 km (7 mi) long, and comprises the following routes:

- 1 (Via Stadera) – Emiciclo di Poggioreale – Port (Via Cristoforo Colombo)
- 2 Piazza Nazionale – San Giovanni a Teduccio (ANM depot)
- 4 San Giovanni a Teduccio (ANM depot) – Port (Via Cristoforo Colombo)

Due to further work on the construction of Municipio metro station, the movement of trams into Piazza Vittoria is temporarily suspended.

To work around this problem, the city considered building a temporary terminus, which would have been located in Via Cristoforo Colombo. If that terminus had been built, it would have given access to some abandoned tram lines.

== Projects ==
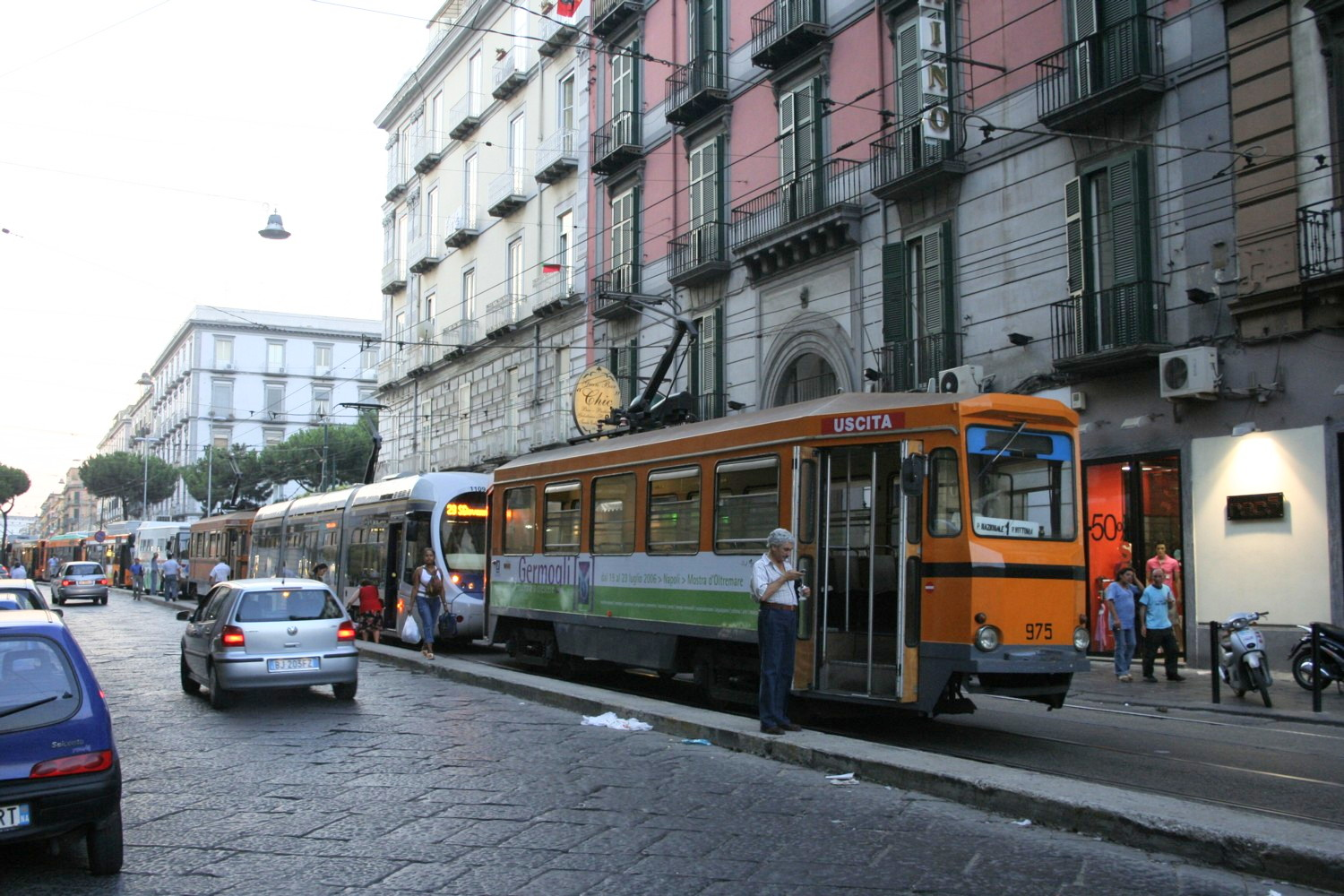
A line of trams in Corso Garibaldi. At the head of the line is Peter Witt-type tram no. 975.

A new extension is under construction along Via Stadera (formerly line 31). The extension work was scheduled to be completed by the end of 2009 or early 2010, but has been delayed.

The General Plan of Urban Traffic proposes the construction of new tram lines to the district of Ponticelli, and along Via S.Alfonso Maria dei Liguori as far as Piazza Carlo III, the restoration of the connection to Mergellina, and a new line, built to light rail specifications, from Piscinola to Villaricca, on the trail of the former Ferrovia Alifana.

If work on all of these projects were completed, the network would be formed by the following lines:

- 1 Emiciclo di Poggioreale–Piazza Sannazaro
- 2 Via Stadera–San Giovanni a Teduccio
- 2/ Emiciclo di Poggioreale–San Giovanni a Teduccio
- 4 San Giovanni a Teduccio (ANM depot)–Piazza Vittoria
- Branch to Piazza Carlo III
- Line to Ponticelli
- Piscinola–Villaricca line

== Rolling stock ==
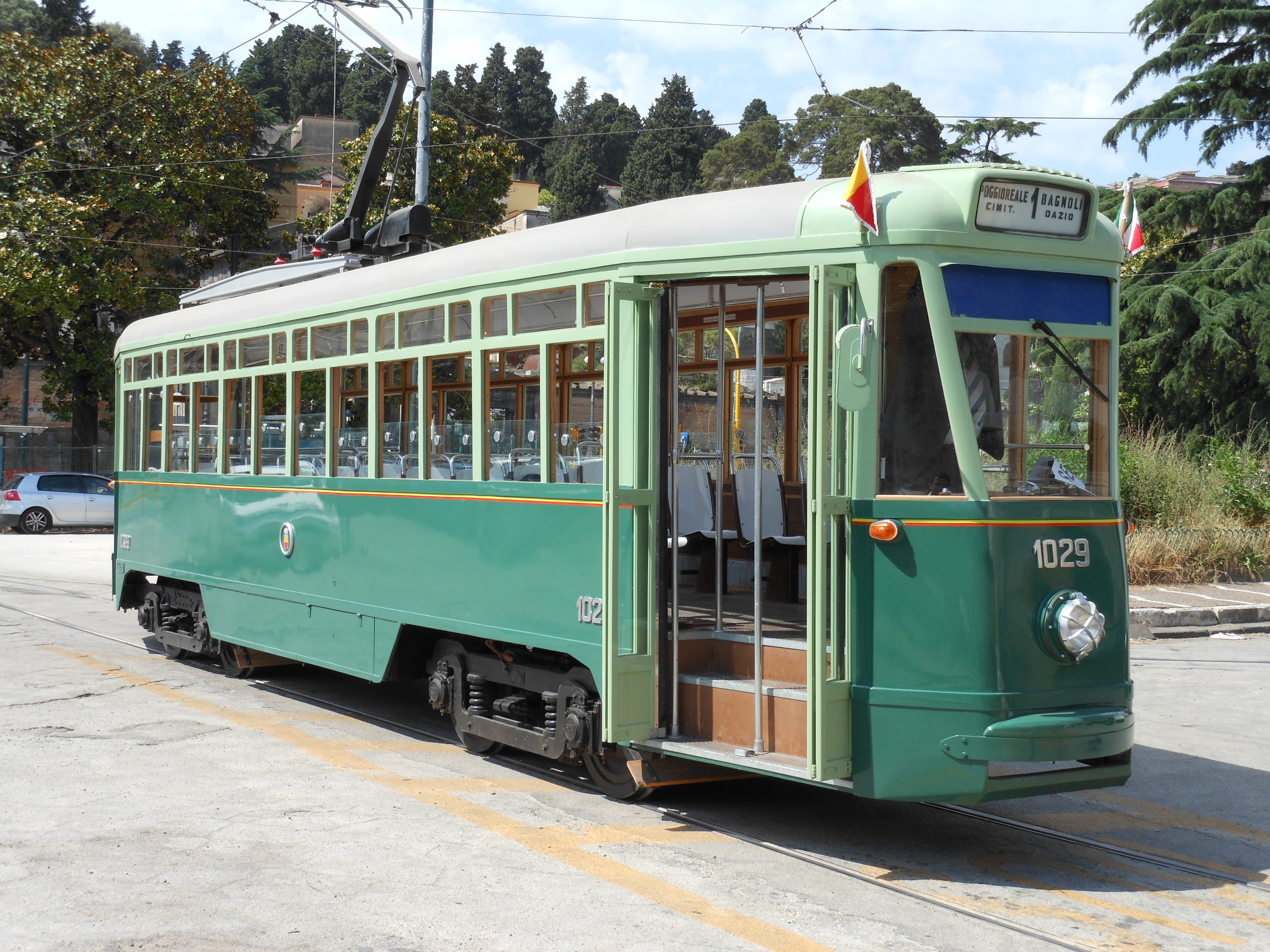
1935-built tramcar 1029 was preserved with its original body, and in 2006–2011 it was fully restored. A pantograph replaced its trolley pole.

By the late 1970s, the only trams remaining in service were from the series 951–1054, which were Peter Witt-type trams built by Officine Ferroviarie Meridionali in the 1930s, originally as 901–906 (built 1930–32, later renumbered 1022 and 1050–1054, respectively) and 951-1050 (built 1933–35). These had been rebuilt in the 1950s and early 1960s, with modernised front and rear ends, among other changes. Between 1976 and 1980, a total of 72 of these were fully rebodied, keeping their fleet numbers, and the last unrebodied cars were withdrawn from service between 1981 and 1984. The only car that remained in use with its older body was No. 1029, which after 1980 was relegated to work duties, not passenger service, and was withdrawn entirely in December 1992.

=== Current fleet ===
- 22 Ansaldobreda Sirio
- 18 CT139K Peter Witt streetcars, most built in 1933–1935 by OFM, rebodied in 1976–1980
- 20 initially + 30 more Bozankaya trams ordered (2025–)

== Depots ==
Of the five depots used by the full network, only one remains active, namely the San Giovanni depot, in the eastern Naples suburb of San Giovanni a Teduccio.

== See also ==
- Metropolitana di Napoli
- History of rail transport in Italy
- Rail transport in Italy
