= Municipio–Porto station =

Naples Metro station

Coordinates: 40°50′23″N 14°15′08″E

Municipio Porto
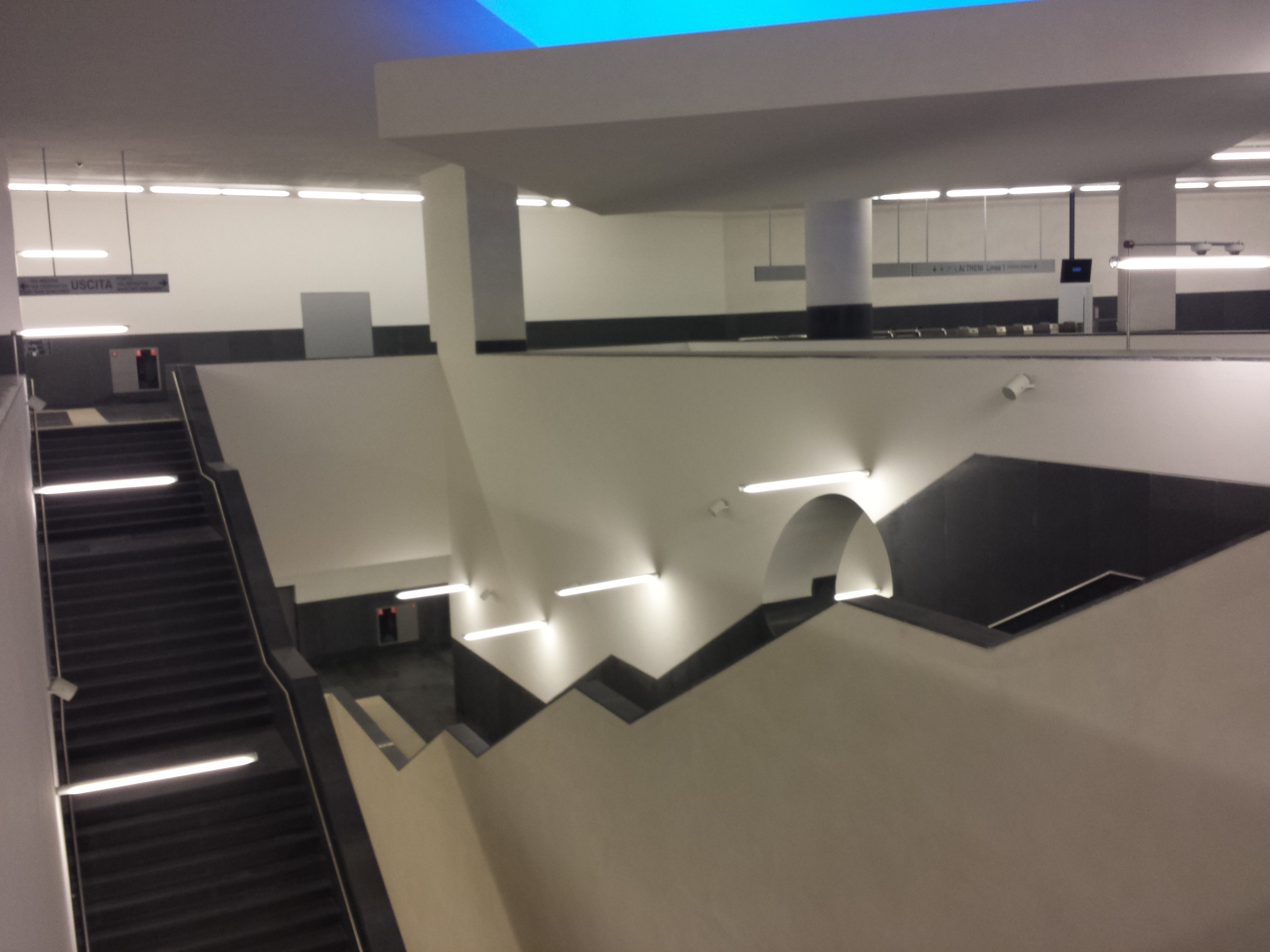

General information
- Location: Piazza Municipio, Naples
- System: Naples Metro station
- Owner: City of Naples
- Operator: ANM
- Lines: Line 1, Line 6
- Connections: Urban and suburban buses, trolleybuses

Construction
- Structure type: Underground
- Accessible: Yes

History
- Opened: 2 June 2015

Services
Preceding station	Naples Metro	Following station
Toledo towards Piscinola Scampia	Line 1	Università towards Centro Direzionale
Preceding station	Naples Metro	Following station
Terminus	Line 6	Chiaia towards Mostra
Route map
Location

Municipio Porto is a Naples Metro underground station that serves Line 1 and Line 6 of the Naples Metro. It is located in the quarters of Porto. The Line 1 station opened on 2 June 2015, being added to the section of the line opened earlier, while Line 6 station opened on 17 July 2024.

== See also ==
- List of Naples Metro stations
