= Mostra station =

Naples Metro station

Coordinates: 40°49′28″N 14°11′37″E

Mostra
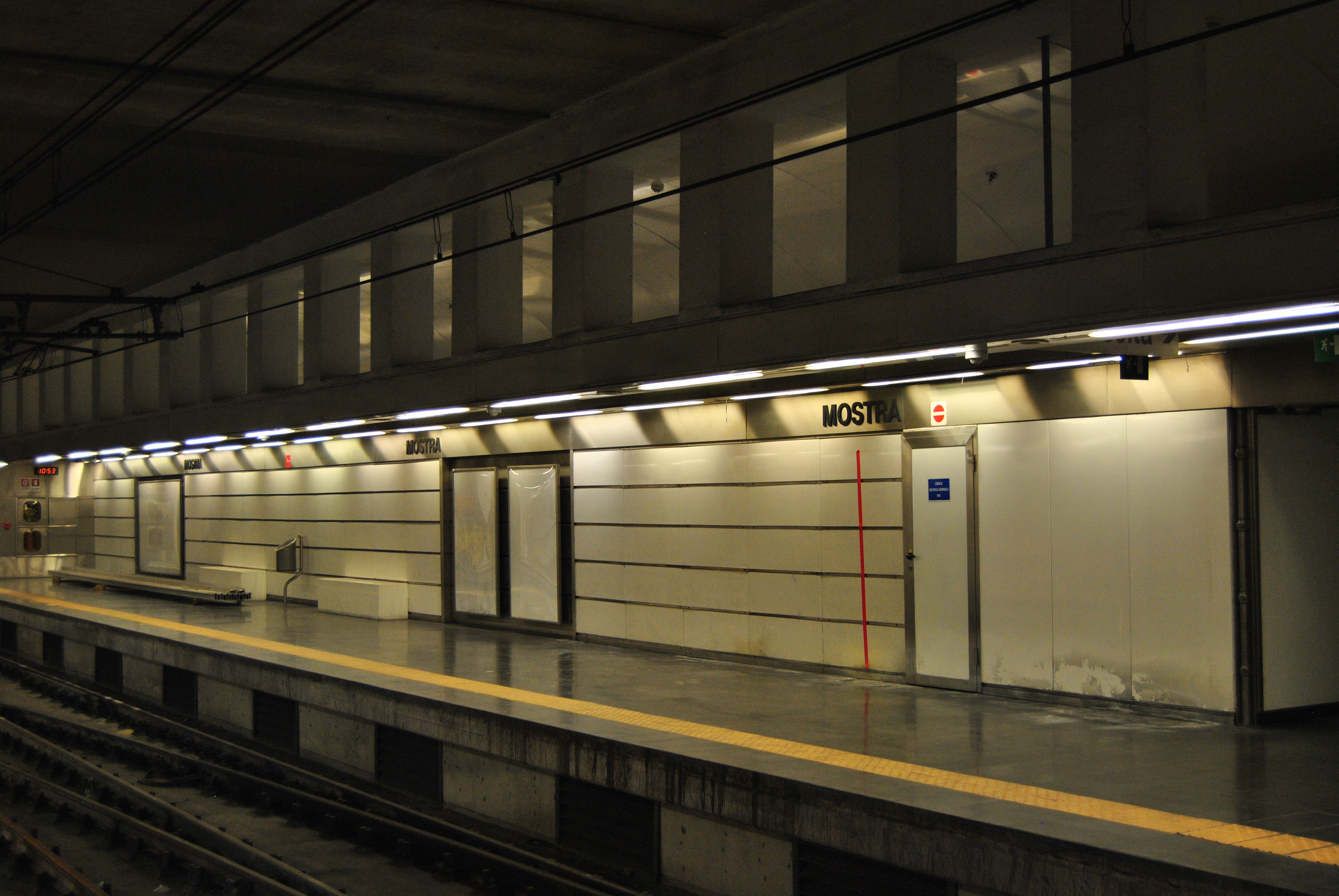

General information
- Location: Piazzale Tecchio, Naples
- System: Naples Metro station
- Operator: ANM
- Line: Line 6
- Connections: Napoli Campi Flegrei (Line 2); Urban and suburban buses

History
- Opened: 4 February 2007

Services
Preceding station	Naples Metro	Following station
Augusto towards Municipio	Line 6	Terminus
Route map
Location

Mostra is a Naples Metro underground station that serves Line 6. It also offers interchange to the Cumana railway. It was opened on 4 February 2007 as part of the inaugural section of Line 6 between Mergellina and Mostra.

The station, even though it is terminal, presents binary loops that end in the temporary storage of trains of Line 6, waiting for work to finish in the new one, which is why the two tracks are through. Since then show trains exclusively in the direction Mergellina. Located in the district of Fuorigrotta, the station is located near the Stadio Diego Armando Maradona and some university faculties: in spite of all passenger movements is not as high as the other metro lines. Mostra is part of Art Stations with works by Merz, Sironi and Pisani.

== See also ==
- List of Naples Metro stations
