= ANM (Naples) =

Public transit agency in Naples, Italy

Azienda Napoletana Mobilità (ANM)
- Company type: Municipally controlled joint-stock company (since 2001)
- Predecessor: Azienda Tranvie Autofilovie Napoli (ATAN)
- Founded: 1995
- Area served: Naples, Italy, urban area and portion of suburban area
- Services: Metro, tram, trolleybus, bus
- Owner: Comune di Napoli
- Number of employees: 2,654 (2010)
- Website: www.anm.it

Azienda Napoletana Mobilità SpA (English: Neapolitan Mobility Company, or Mobility Company of Naples), more commonly known simply as ANM, is a municipally controlled public company that is the primary provider of urban public transportation in the city of Naples, Italy, and also provides a portion of the surface transit service in surrounding municipalities. In addition to a network of tram, trolleybus and motorbus routes, ANM operates the Naples Metro system and four urban funiculars. The metro system and funiculars were operated by a different company from 2001 to 2013, when they again became part of ANM.

== History and description ==
ANM was formed on 1 July 1995 through a reorganization of its predecessor, the Azienda Tranvie Autofilovie Napoli (ATAN) (English: Naples Tramway-Bus-Trolleybus Company), which was also a municipal authority. ANM became a joint-stock company (SpA in Italian) on 30 March 2001.

As of 2009, the company operated three tram lines (see Trams in Naples), six trolleybus lines (see Trolleybuses in Naples) and around 140 motorbus routes. The operating fleet at that time included approximately 50 trams, 63 trolleybuses (with 24 more in storage) and a large number of diesel buses. In 2015, the fleet of surface-transit vehicles included 52 trams, 87 trolleybuses, 656 diesel buses and 70 natural-gas buses.

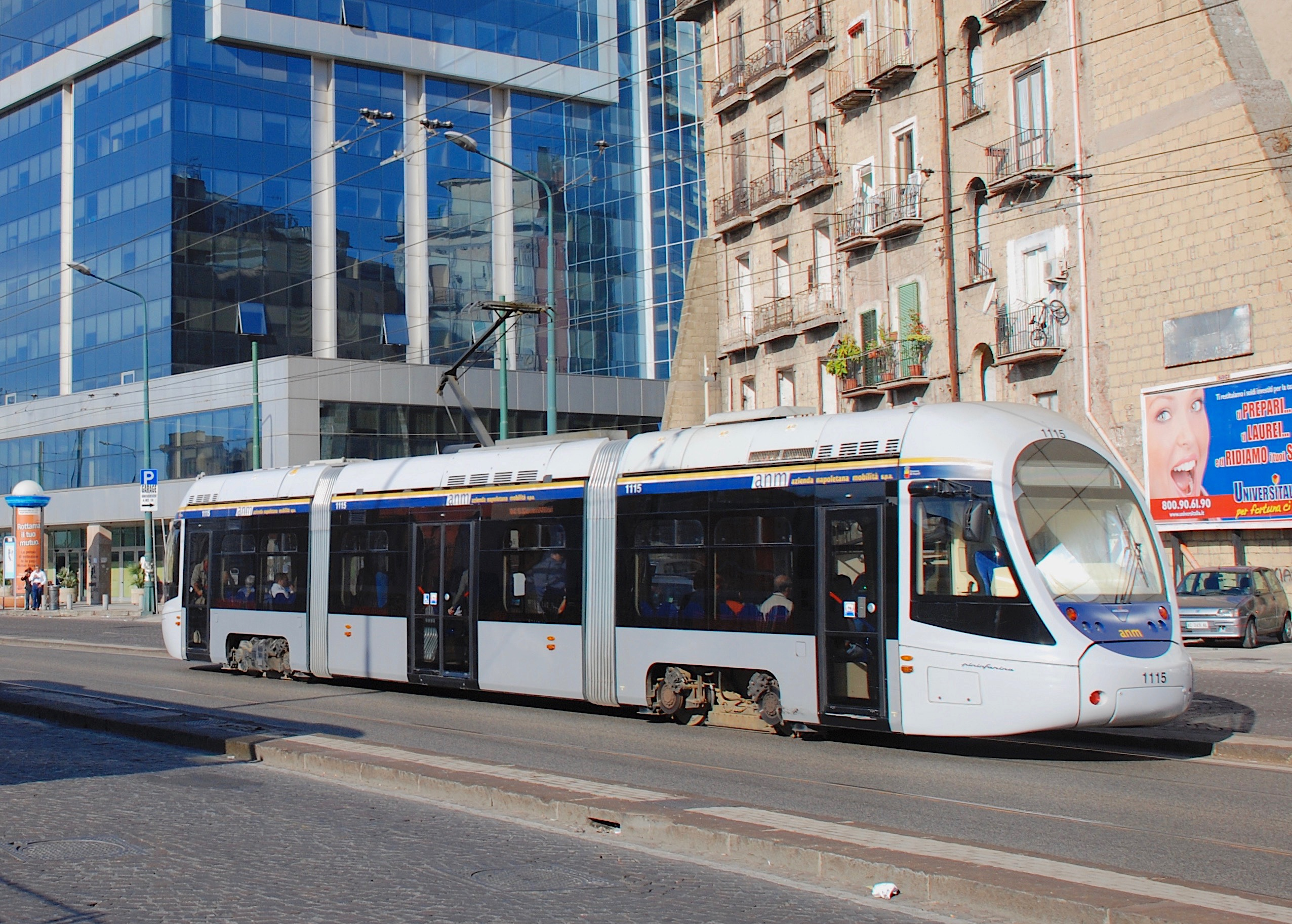
An ANM tram in 2007

ANM also operates four municipally owned funiculars and the Naples Metro. In 2001, operation of these was transferred from ANM to a 2000-established joint-stock company named Metronapoli, but in November 2013 Metronapoli was merged with ANM, under the ANM name.

The company provides some bus service to areas outside the city of Naples proper (Comune di Napoli). However, most suburban bus service is provided by other companies, mainly CTP, which until 2008 was half-owned by the city of Naples and half by the Province of Naples but has been fully owned by the province since August 2008.

ANM's service includes both express and local bus service connecting Naples' main airport, Capodichino Airport, with the city center and Napoli Centrale railway station (at Piazza Garibaldi). The express service is called Alibus.

As of 2014, total annual patronage (boardings) on the ANM system was approximately 138 million, with 92 million on bus routes and 46 million on the rail network.

== See also ==
- Transport in Naples
- Integrated ticketing in Campania
