= Chiaia Funicular =

Funicolar in Naples

Coordinates: 40.8404°N 14.2332°E

Chiaia funicular
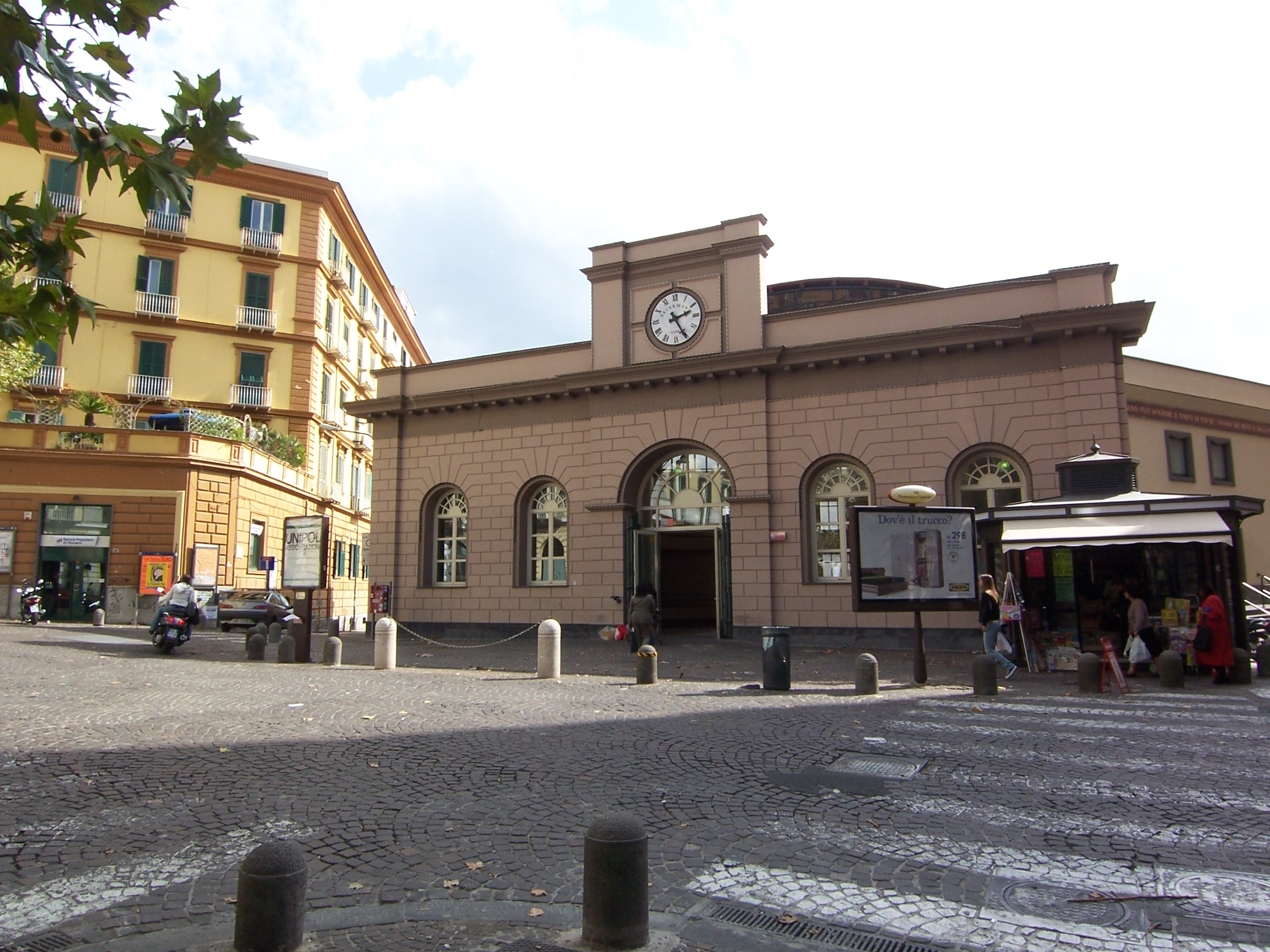
- Via Cimarosa station

Overview
- Native name: Funicolare di Chiaia
- Status: in use
- Locale: Naples, Italy
- Stations: 4

Service
- Type: Funicular
- Operator(s): 1975–95: ATAN; 1995–2001: ANM; 2001–13: Metronapoli; 2013 to date: ANM

History
- Opened: 1889

Technical
- Line length: 0.5 km (0.31 mi)
- Track gauge: 1,435 mm (4 ft 8 1/2 in)

The Chiaia funicular (Italian: Funicolare di Chiaia) is one of four funiculars in the public transportation system of Naples, Italy. Each system is a true funicular: an inclined railway with two passenger cars connected via cables, operating in concert.

Opened in 1889, the Chiaia Funicular is one of the oldest funicular railways in the world, and carries over half a million passengers per year.

The line connects its upper terminus in Vomero to its lower terminus in Chiaia via four stations: Cimarosa Station, Palazzolo Station, Corso Vittorio Emanuele Station, and Regina Magherita Station. It primarily connects Piazza Vanvitelli, at the top of Vomero Hill, to Rione Amadeo.

The line connects with Line 1 of the Naples Metro and the central funicular at Via Cimarosa, and with Line 2 at Via Regina Margherita.

At Cimarosa the Chiaia is connected by an underground tunnel to both Vanvitelli station, on Line 1 of the Naples Metro, and to the Central Funicular.

The Montesanto Funicular is a short walk to the northeast. A fourth funicular, the Mergellina funicular, connects Posillipo Alto with the city's Mergellina area. A now defunct system, the Sorrento Funicular, operated nearby from 1883 to 1886.

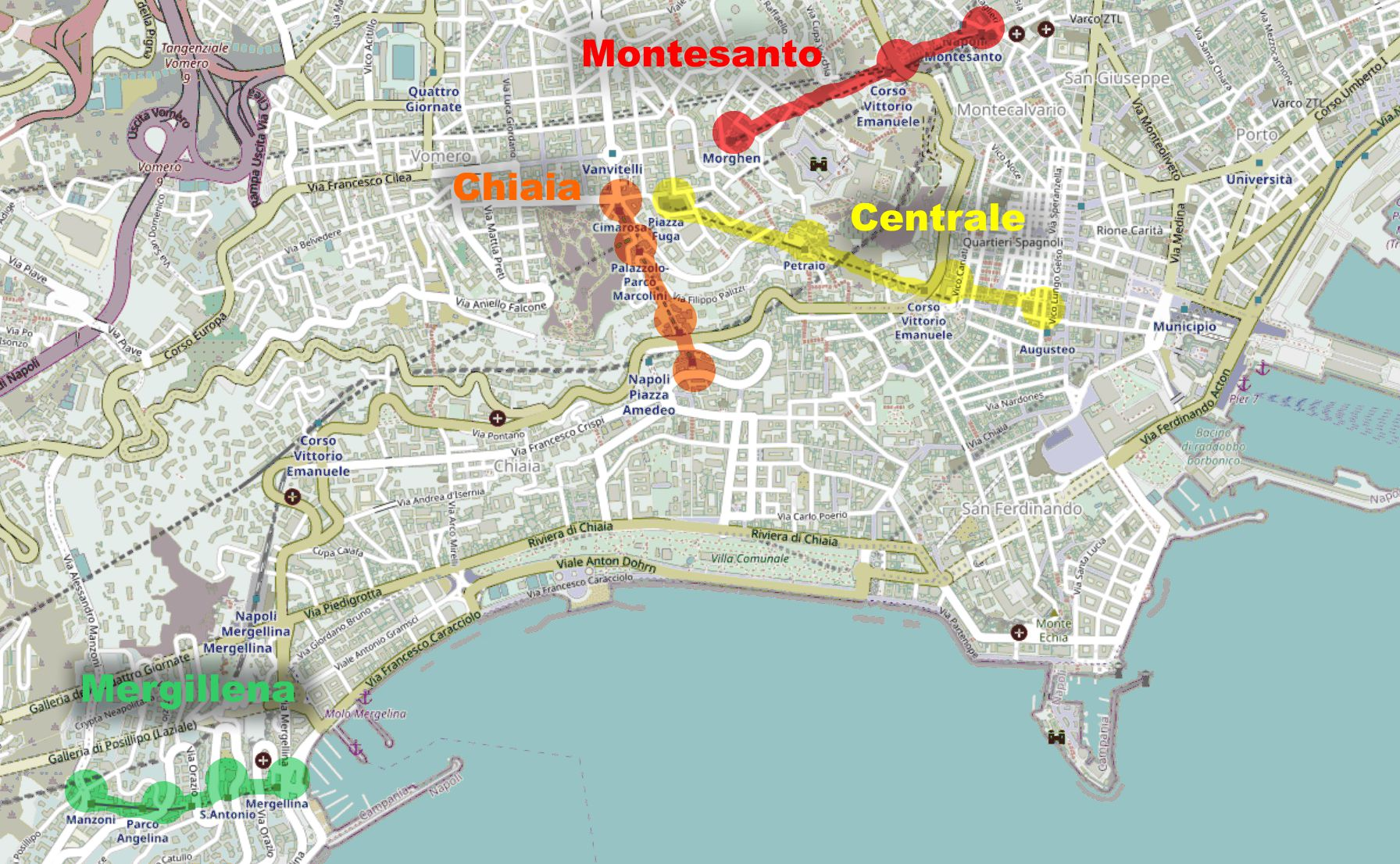
The four operating funicular systems of Naples, Italy

At the Chiaia funicular the exterior of the upper station features a latin quote (in two parts, on either side of the building, in gold lettering on a maroon band, in the upper frieze): "Time by itself does not exist; but from things themselves there results a sense of what has already taken place, what is now taking place and what will take place. It must not be claimed that anyone can sense time by itself, apart from the movement of things." (IL TEMPO, Roman poet, Lucretius, De rerum natura (On the Nature of Things), Book I, 459).

== History ==
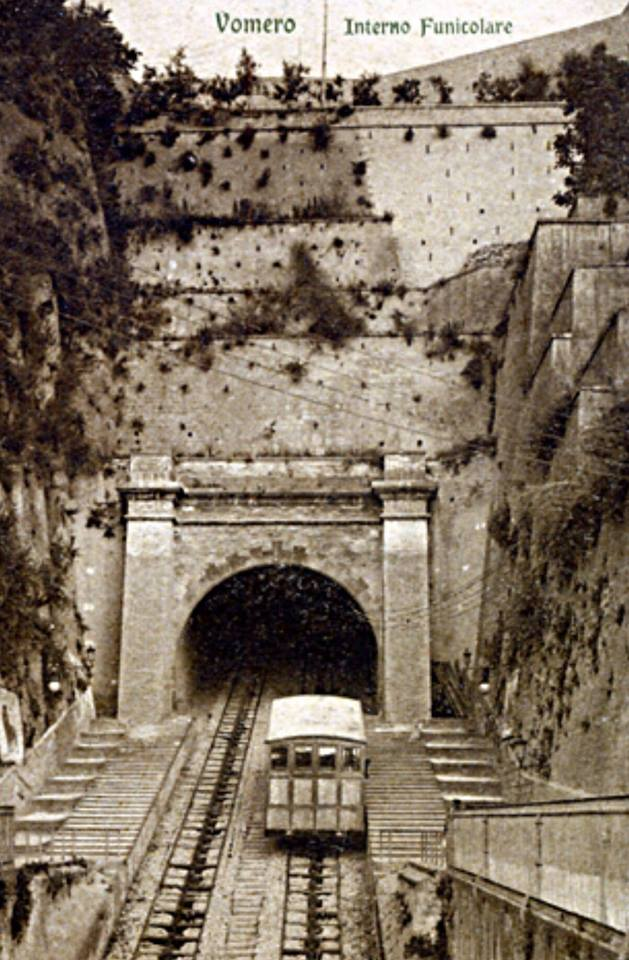
Chiaia Funicular in the late 19th century

In the second half of the 19th century, the Vomero hill area to the northwest of Naples began to expand as a new residential area. Because of the steep incline of the hill it was difficult to access though. As a result, construction soon began on both the Chiaia and Montesanto funicular cable railways. A local engineering firm, Le Officine Nazionali di Savigliano was granted the tender for all engineering, electric and mechanical work on the line. Nearly 300 metres shorter than the Montesanto incline, the ChiaiafFunicular was the first to be completed, opening to the public on 15 October 1889.

For the first eleven years of operation, the Chiaia funicular was powered by Escher Wyss steam engines, but in 1900 the line became electrified. The new twin-electric engines, provided by Brown Boveri & Co, gave 135 horsepower each, and greatly improved efficiency. In 1914 the original cars were replaced after 25 years of service, and two years later, in 1916, a third station, Palazzolo was inaugurated on the line. Until 1926 it only operated three stops, with the opening of Palazzolo station (Parco Marcolini), delayed due to difficulty in accessing the area in which its construction was planned. OTIS elevators were included in its design to improve access to the platform at this station.

With the fourth planned station finally fully operational by 1926, the line had finally been completed as planned, 37 years after it had first opened. The opening of Palazzolo station was the last change to the line for the next fifty years. The Chiaia line was not affected by either of the world wars, and continued to operate throughout both conflicts. In 1975 Azienda Tranvie Autofilovie Napoletane (ATAN – Neapolitan Light Rail Company) replaced the Società Ferrovie del Vomero (Vomero Train Society) as the operator of the line. Having reviewed its condition, in 1976 the entire line was overhauled and upgraded. A major modernisation programmed was begun, with Giustino Costruzioni given responsibility for the engineering works, Officine Mecchaniche Agudio carrying out electronic and mechanical work, Lovisolo constructing brand new cars, B.M.B. installing new modern electrical controls, and Fitre (later replaced by Holtz) undertaking transmission and safety work.

The refurbished Chiaia funicular reopened to the public on 22 September 1977, although accusations of inadequate engineering works were levelled at the contractors, and these problems were not finally rectified until 2004. In 1995 the line's operator, ATAN, was rebranded as Azienda Napoletana Mobilità (ANM - Neapolitan Mobility Agency), and in 1998, further works were carried out to again modernise the line. In February 2001 ANM was replaced by Metronapoli as the new operator of the line. By 2003 the latest upgrade works had been completed and that work saw the line completely restored and brought up to adequate European safety standards. It also resulted in all of the stations being redone in Art Nouveau style, restoring the line to its former splendor. ANM took over Metronapoli in November 2013, thereby again becoming the Chiaia Funicular's operator.

== Operation ==
The Chiaia funicular carries over half a million passengers annually, with an average of 15,000 passengers on workdays, but this is reduced to an average of 5,000 on weekends and holidays. From the top to bottom the line is 536 metres (1,759 ft) long, and ascends 161 metres (528 ft) in altitude, at an average gradient of 29%. The carriages travel at an average speed of 7.5 metres per second (24.6 ft/s), and the entire route takes three minutes, and eight seconds. Each train can carry 300 passengers at a time, giving a total capacity of 9,500 passengers per hour in each direction, although this capacity is never reached.

== Stations ==
- Cimarosa station
- Palazzolo station
- Corso Vittorio Emanuele station
- Regina Margherita station

== See also ==
- List of funicular railways
- List of Naples metro stations
- List of rapid transit systems
