= Montesanto Funicular =

Coordinates: 40.8459°N 14.2411°E

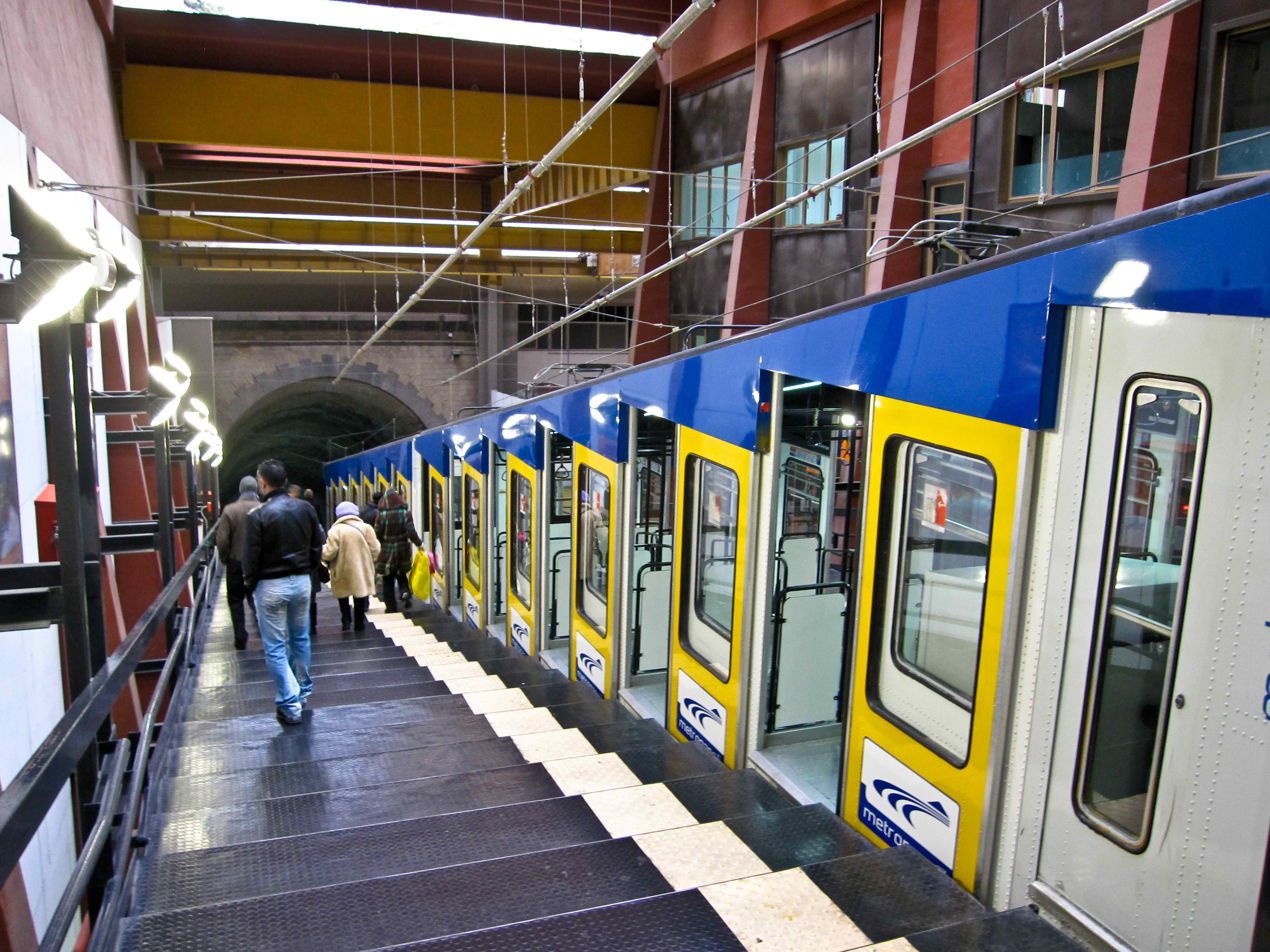

Overview
- Native name: Funicolare di Montesanto
- Status: in use
- Locale: Naples, Italy
- Stations: 3

Service
- Type: Funicular
- Operator(s): 1975–95: ATAN; 1995–2001: ANM; 2001–13: Metronapoli; 2013 to date: ANM

History
- Opened: 1891

Technical
- Line length: 0.824 km (0.512 mi)
- Track gauge: 1,435 mm (4 ft 8 1/2 in)

The Montesanto Funicular (Italian: Funicolare di Montesanto), is one of four operating funiculars in the public transportion system of Naples, Italy. The system is a true funicular: an inclined railway with two passenger cars connected via cables, operating in concert.

Opened in 1891, the Montesanto Funicular carries over 4 million passengers per year. The line connects its upper terminus in the Morghen area of Vomero with its lower terminus near the city's Spanish Quarter via three stations, Morghen, Corso Vittorio Emanuele (Napoli), and Montesanto.

At the upper station, it is a short walk to Piazza Vanvitelli, where there is a connection to Vanvitelli station, on Line 1 of the Naples Metro (Metropolitana di Napoli), and to the Chiaia and Central Funiculars. A fourth funicular, the Mergellina Funicular, connects Posillipo Alto with the city's Mergellina area. A now defunct system, the Sorrento Funicular, operated nearby from 1883-1886.

== History ==
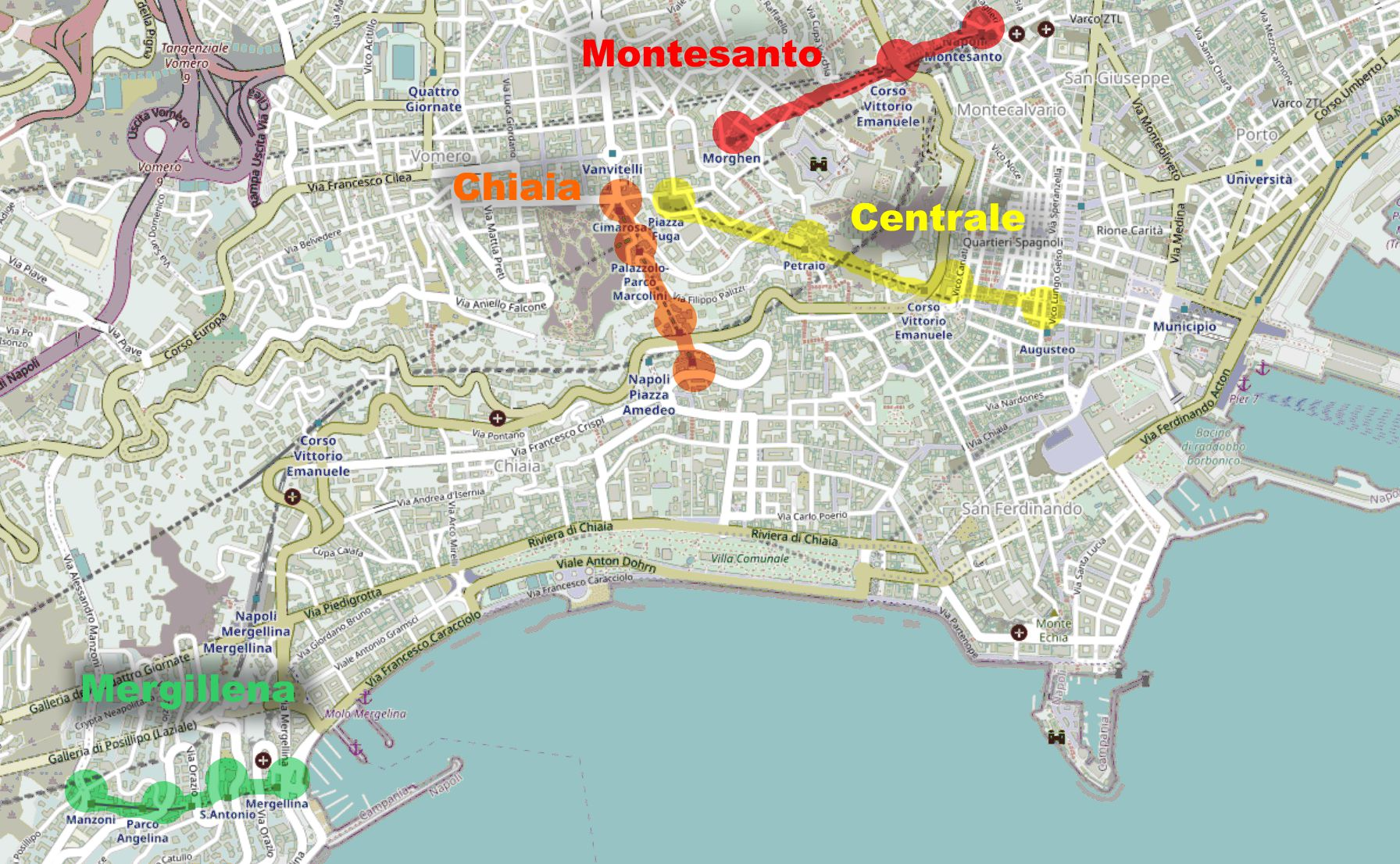
The four operating funicular systems of Naples, Italy, with the Montesanto funicular highlighted in red.

The idea for the construction of the Montesanto funicular was first conceived during the construction of the Cumana Railway which was designed to service Campi Flegrei along the Naples–Torregaveta route. With the residential area expanding around Castel Sant’Elmo, it was decided it would be useful to have a second funicular route connecting the Cumana Railway with Castel Sant'Elmo and the nearby Museo di San Martino. Survey work was carried out by Pariboni & Savoia, and the Neapolitan engineering firm, Officine Nazionali di Savigliano, carried out engineering, electrical and mechanical works as they had done on the Chiaia Funicular. After five years construction, the Montesanto line was opened on May 30, 1891.

Initially the line ran smoothly, but the steep gradients of the Neapolitan lines caused heavy work on the original steam traction engine systems, and they soon began to experience problems. As with the Chiaia line, it was decided to replace the power plants with an all-electrical system, which began operation on June 21, 1901. The new system was more effective, and the Montesanto funicular operated smoothly without any issues for the next several years. The next interruption to service was in 1936, when it was decided to replace the original open carriages with enclosed coaches, which were built by OFM (Officine Ferroviarie Meridionali).

As with the other three lines, the Montesanto line continued to operate successfully for several years, including continuing uninterrupted throughout World War II. As with the other lines, in 1975 Azienda Tranvie Autofilovie Napoletane (ATAN - Neapolitan Light Rail Company) replaced the Società Ferrovie del Vomero (Vomero Train Society) as the operator of the Montesanto funicular. They carried out an audit on the condition of all their assets, and found that the viaduct in the section linking Montesanto and Corso Vittorio Emanuele had been considerably weakened over time. In addition to the general poor state of decline the Montesanto line had experienced, ATAN decided that the Montesanto line required refurbishment. In 1977 they closed the line to carry out essential engineering and modernisation works, entrusting Officine Mecchaniche Agudio to install the same new features as they were doing on the Chiaia funicular. At this time it was decided to install a second intermediate station at Rafaello/Girolamo Santacroce, but as of 2009 construction of this station is still yet to begin. Guaccio Costruzioni carried out engineering surveys, and Mandolino replaced the lines. Nuova Agudio (formerly Officine Mecchaniche Agudio) were given the tender to modernise and replace all of the electrical and mechanical works. Lovisolo constructed new carriages, BMB installed new control and operation systems, and Holtz refurbished the transmission and safety systems. All of the works had been completed by the beginning of 1984, and the refurbished line reopened to the public on 14 April.

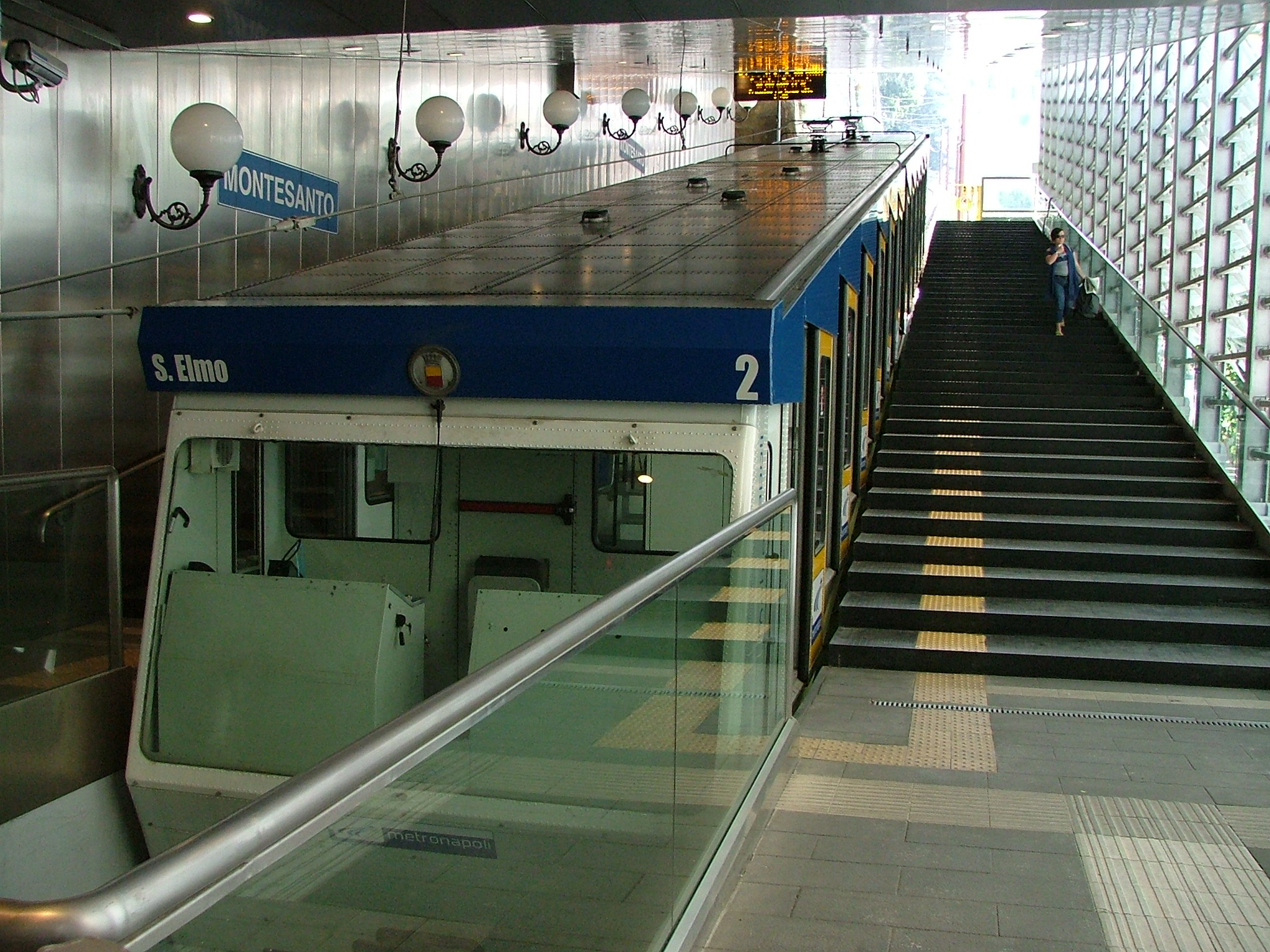
Parked train in the Montesanto station, 2007.

ATAN was reorganized as Azienda Napoletana Mobilità (ANM) in 1995, becoming the line's operator. In 2001, operation of all four Naples funiculars was transferred to a different municipal authority, Metronapoli, but it was transferred back to ANM in November 2013.

Further works were carried out in 2005 by Silvio D'Ascia in order to better integrate the line with other urban railway services such as Line 2, Cumana and Circumflegrea, but by early 2008 the Montesanto funicular was fully operational again.

== Operation ==
The Montesanto Funicular carries over 4 million passengers annually. It carries an average of 12,500 passengers on workdays, but this is reduced to an average of 4,000 on weekends and holidays.

From the top to bottom the line is 825 metres (2,707 ft) long, and ascends 168 metres (551 ft) in altitude, at an average gradient of 23%. The carriages travel at an average speed of seven metres per second (22.97 ft/s), and the entire route takes four minutes and twenty five seconds. Each train can carry 300 passengers at a time, giving a total capacity of 6,000 passengers per hour in each direction.

== Stations ==
- Morghen Station
- Corso Vittorio Emanuele Station
- Montesanto Station

== See also ==
- List of Naples metro stations
- List of rapid transit systems
- List of funicular railways
