= Piazza Ferdinando Fuga =

Square in Naples

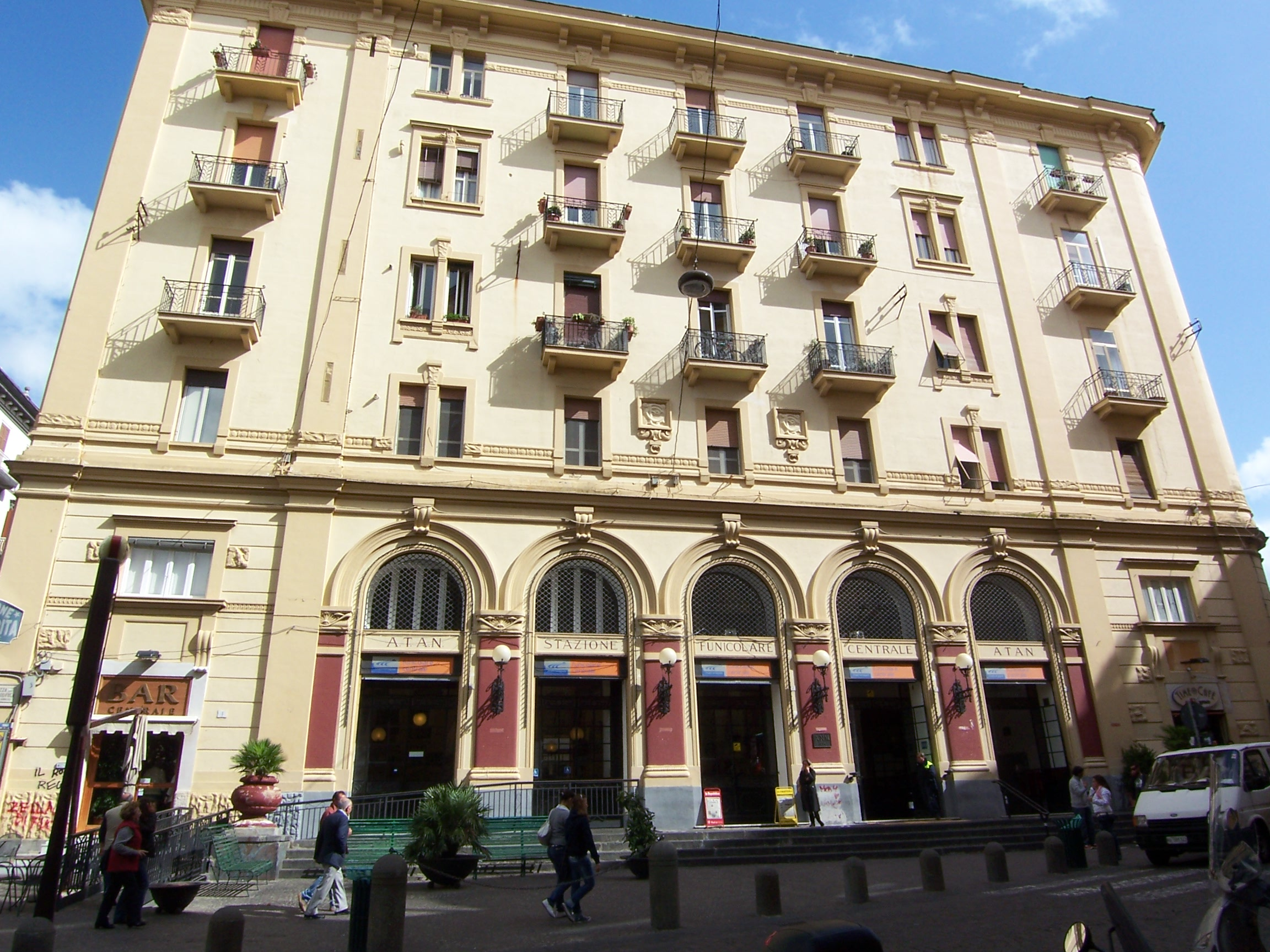
Piazza Fuga in 2010.

Piazza Ferdinando Fuga is a square in Naples located in the Vomero district. It is dedicated to Ferdinando Fuga, the architect who made many of his main works in Naples, including the Girolamini church and the Real Albergo dei Poveri. The piazza is popularly known as piazzetta Fuga for its modest size. During the fascist period it was known as piazza Franco Belfiore to commemorate a young fascist who fell fighting in a clash in 1921.

== Historical notes and description ==
The square is built with a triangular plan. Both via Cimarosa and via Lordi flow into it. Three important buildings are within the square: the Central Funicular station, Palazzo Avena and the entrance to Villa Haas (Villa Palazzolo).

== Transportation ==
The square can be reached via the Central Funicular, of which it is the terminus. On the west side the square is connected with via Morghen by the stairs of via Cimarosa, equipped in 2002 with urban escalators built by the Municipality and managed by ANM.
