= Mergellina Funicular =

Coordinates: 40.8259°N 14.2169°E

Overview
- Native name: Funicolare di Mergellina
- Status: In operation
- Locale: Naples, Italy
- Stations: 5

Service
- Type: Funicular
- Operator(s): 1975–95: ATAN; 1995–2001: ANM; 2001–13: Metronapoli; 2013 to date: ANM

History
- Opened: 1931

Technical
- Line length: 0.55 km (0.34 mi)
- Track gauge: 1,000 mm (3 ft 3 3/8 in)

The Mergellina Funicular (Italian: Funicolare di Mergellina), is one of four operating funiculars in the public transportion system of Naples, Italy. The system is a true funicular: an inclined railway with two passenger cars, connected via cables, operating in concert.

Opened in 1931, the Mergellina Funicular is Naples' fourth and most recent funicular.

The funicular connects its upper terminus in the Posillipo Alto neighborhood with its lower terminus in Mergellina via five stations: Manzoni, Parco Angelina, San Gioacchino, San Antonio and Mergellina. Unlike Naples' other three funiculars with upper terminals near Piazza Vanvitelli in Vomero, the Mergellina line is located farther to the northwest. It runs uphill from the marina at Mergellina Sanazzarro to Manzoni, close to the Line 6 of the Naples Metro.

The Chiaia, Central and Montesanto funiculars connect nearby lower areas of Naples to the high neighborhood of Vomero. A now defunct system, the Sorrento Funicular, operated nearby from 1883 to 1886.

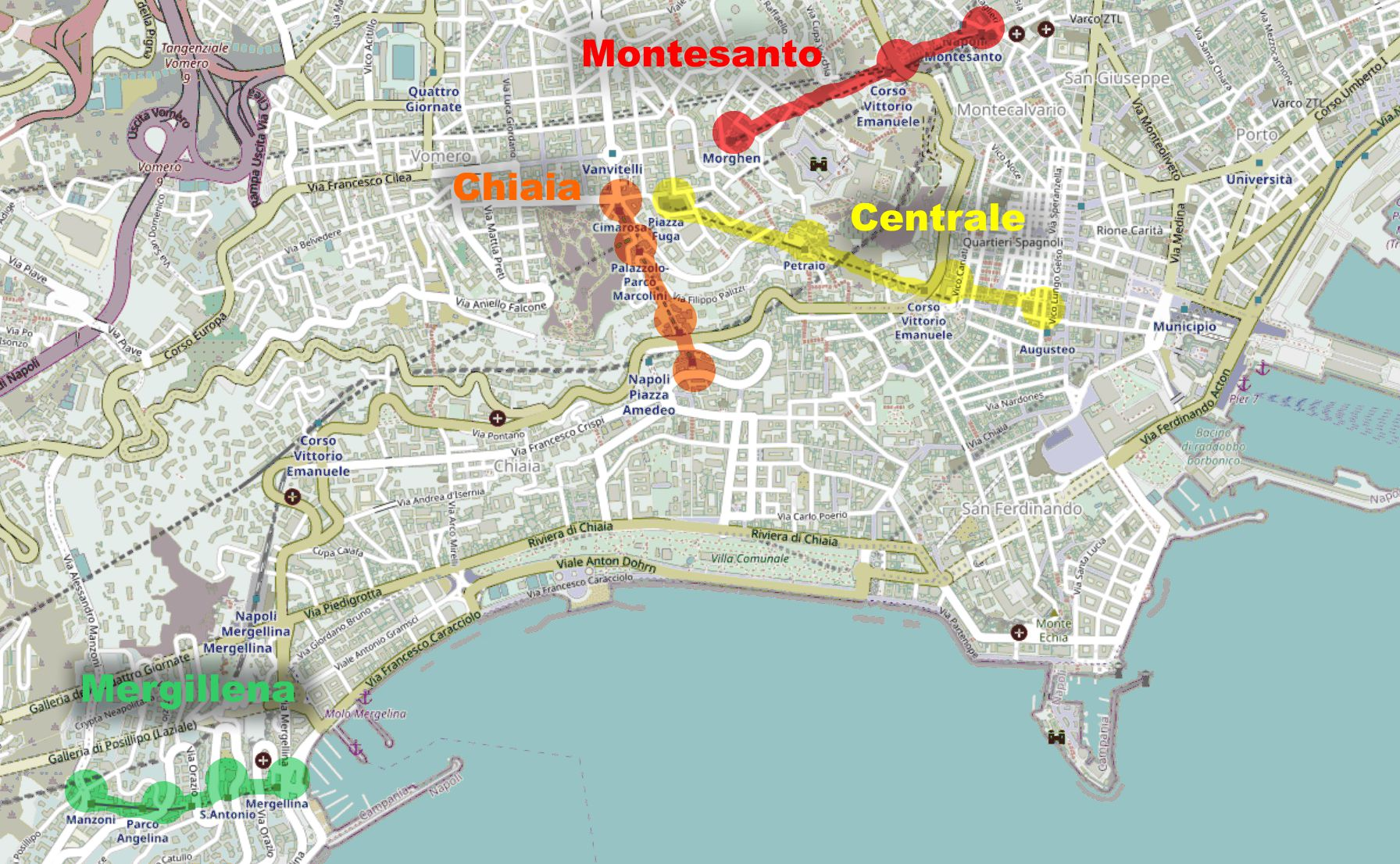
The four operating funicular systems of Naples, Italy

== History ==
In the early 20th century, Naples' urban expansion spread toward the northwestern hills, with new residential neighbourhoods on Posillipo hill. To facilitate easier access into the area, construction commenced on the funicular in the late 1920s, and it began service with delays or construction complications on 24 May 1931.

The funicular operated without problem through World War II and for much of the immediate post-war period. By the early 1980s, the now aging line experienced problems due to its uninterrupted use and began having regular service disruptions. While the line remained popular, it did not generate revenue that could finance its overhaul, and its operators transferred management over to regional authorities.

Modernization commenced in May 1985, with new electronic and mechanical components, operation controls, transmissions and safety systems installed. The overhauled line reopened on 16 January 1986 after a seven-month closure. The line closed briefly between May 1989 and March 1990 for an overhaul to the rail and traction systems, in time for Naples to host the 1990 FIFA World Cup.

In 1999, the Campania Regional Management Committee transferred management of the Mergellina Funicular to Azienda Napoletana Mobilità (ANM - Neapolitan Mobility Agency), who were by then responsible for running the four funiculars in Naples. As with the other three, ANM was replaced as the operator on 1 February 2001 by Metronapoli, who began a process of better integrating the various elements of rail transport within Naples, creating better interchanges and connections. ANM took over Metronapoli in November 2013, thereby again becoming the Mergellina Funicular's operator.

After numerous stoppages since 2016 due to workforce issues, ANM closed the system in October 2020, because of COVID-19 complications. The Mergellina funicular remained out of service, well into 2021, ostensibly replaced by a six-day per week bus shuttle.

== Operation ==
The Mergellina Funicular carries a quarter of a million passengers annually, with an average of 3,200 passengers on workdays and 2,000 on weekends and holidays, making it the least used of Naples' funiculars. The line is 570 metres (1,870 ft) long, and ascends 147 metres (482 ft) at an average gradient of 16%, although one section is as steep as 46%. The carriages travel at an average speed of 3.5 metres per second (11.48 ft/s), and the entire route takes seven minutes. Each train can carry 60 passengers, giving a capacity of 480 passengers per hour in each direction.

== Stations ==
- Manzoni station
- Parco Angelina station
- San Gioacchino station
- San Antonio station
- Mergellina station

== See also ==
- List of Naples metro stations
- List of rapid transit systems
- List of funicular railways
