= San Diego all'Ospedaletto, Naples =

Church of San Diego all'Ospedaletto
- Chiesa di San Diego all'Ospedaletto
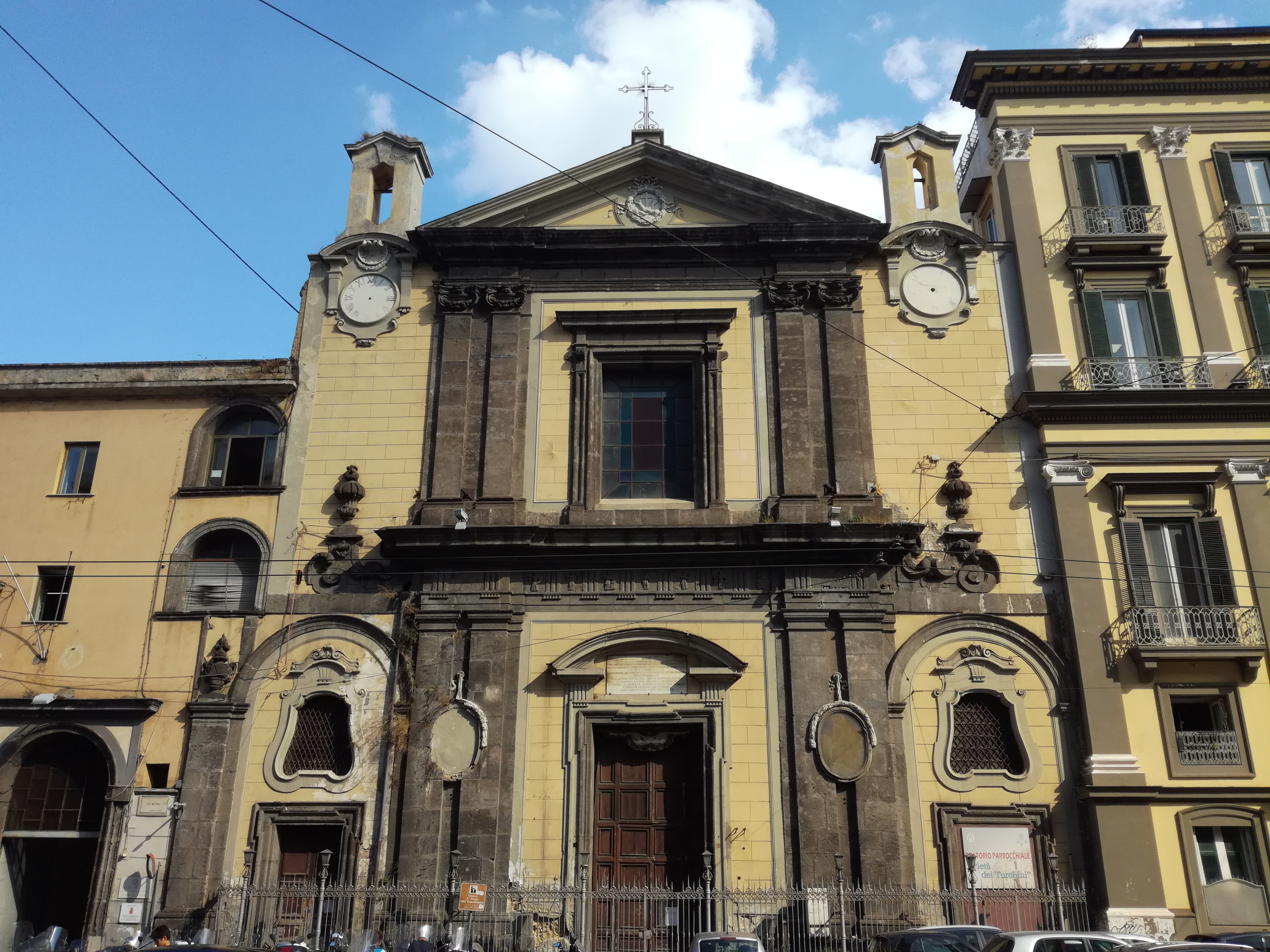
- The facade of San Diego all'Ospedaletto in Naples.
- Church of San Diego all'Ospedaletto
- 40.842360°N 14.252950°E
- Location: Via Medina, rione Carità, Naples; Province of Naples, Campania
- Country: Italy
- Denomination: Roman Catholic

History
- Status: Active
- Founder: Giovanna Castriota
- Dedication: Diego of Alcalá

Architecture
- Architectural type: Church
- Style: Baroque architecture
- Groundbreaking: 1514

Administration
- Diocese: Roman Catholic Archdiocese of Naples

San Diego all'Ospedaletto, also known as San Giuseppe Maggiore, is a Baroque-style church located on via Medina in the rione Carità in Naples, Italy. It is located across the street from the tall modern NH Ambassador Hotel and diagonal from the Palazzo Giordano and Questura.

The name of San Giuseppe Maggiore derives from a church of that name belonging to Archconfraternity of the Mannesi (i falegnami), that was demolished nearby in the 16th century. The church was commissioned by Giovanna Castriota in 1514, a lady of the court of Giovanna III dei Castriota. It became a hospital for the poor, and later passed on to the Franciscan Order of Friars Minor. The present building was reconstructed in 1595 and dedicated to Saint Diego of Alcalá.

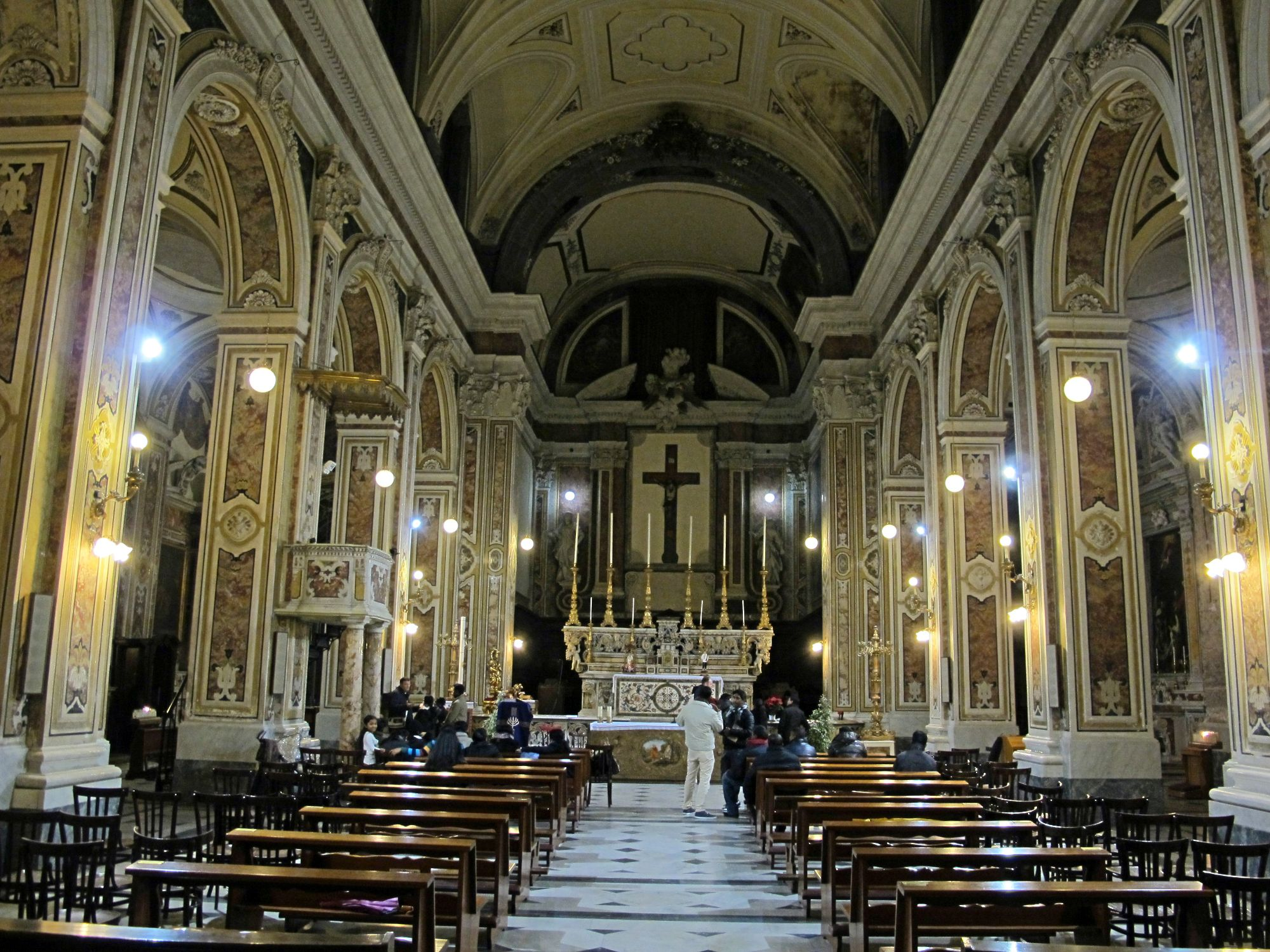
Nave

The original nave was frescoed by Battistello Caracciolo, Andrea Vaccaro, and Massimo Stanzione. Only the former's frescoed escaped destruction during the earthquake of 1688. The canvas by Stanzione of the Transit of St Joseph remains in the last chapel on right. Vaccaro painted a canvas of St Anthony of Padua in the church. The polychrome marble altar was designed by Giovan Battista Nauclerio and completed by Giuseppe de Filippo. On the counterfacade is a marble tomb (1703) of the Prince Piombini, by Giacomo Colombo, using designs by Francesco Solimena.

== Bibliography ==
- Vincenzo Regina, Le chiese di Napoli. Viaggio indimenticabile attraverso la storia artistica, architettonica, letteraria, civile e spirituale della Napoli sacra, Newton e Compton Editor, Naples 2004.
