= Ferdinando Fuga =

Italian architect

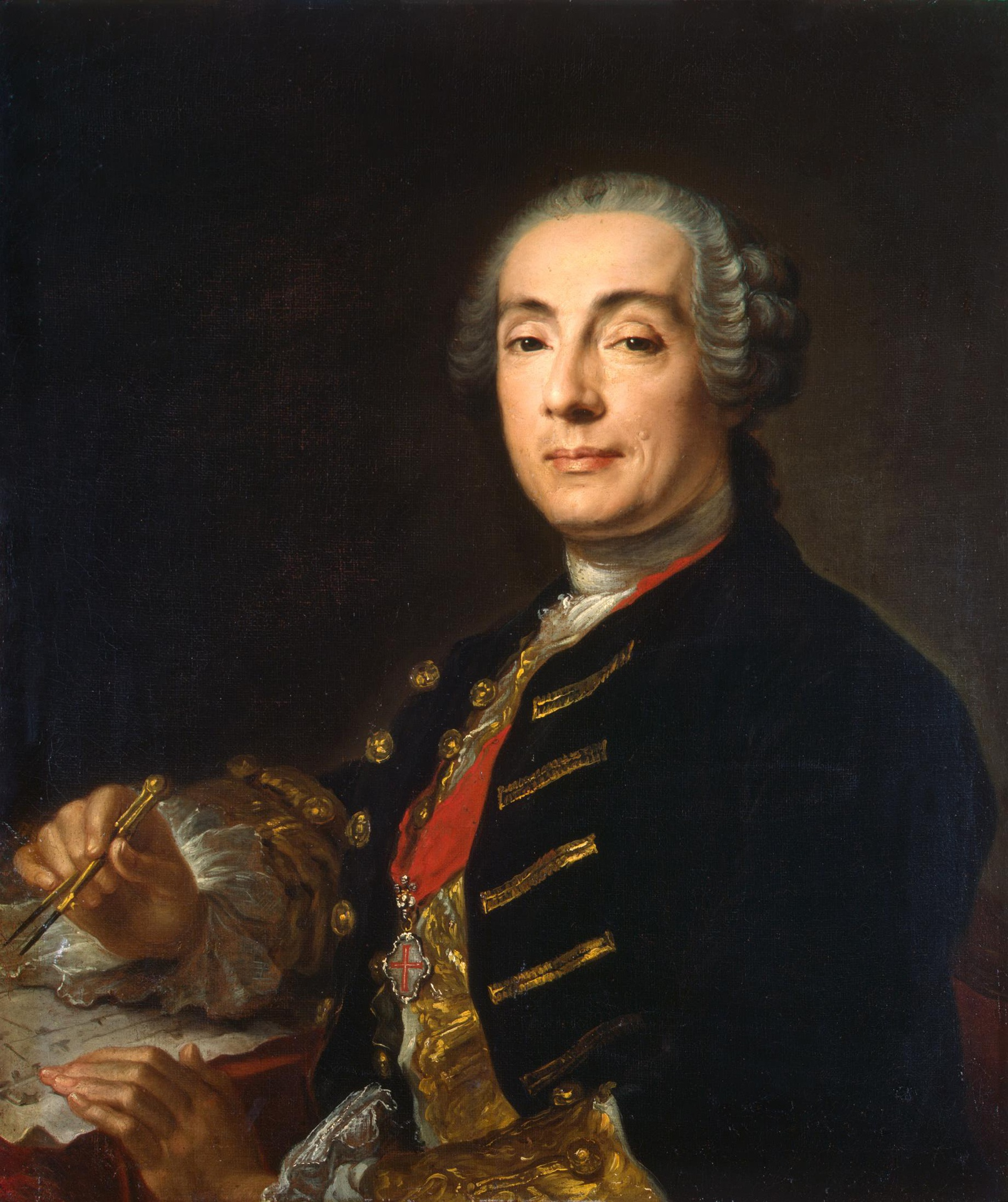
- Portrait of Ferdinando Fuga by Giuseppe Bonito
- Born: 11 November 1699; Florence
- Died: 7 February 1782 (aged 82); Naples
- Occupation: Architect
- Spouse: Angela Ponetti
- Children: 8
- Buildings: Palazzo Corsini, Rome; Ospedale L'Albergo Reale dei Poveri, Naples
- Projects: New façade of the church of Santa Maria Maggiore

Ferdinando Fuga (11 November 1699 – 7 February 1782) was an Italian architect who was born in Florence, and is known for his work in Rome and Naples. Much of his early work was in Rome, notably, the Palazzo della Consulta (1732–7) at the Quirinal, the Palazzo Corsini (1736–54), the façade of the Santa Maria Maggiore (1741–3), and the Church of Sant'Apollinare (1742–8). He later moved to Naples and notably designed the Albergo de' Poveri (an enormous work-house) (1751–81), the façade of the Church of the Gerolamini, and that of the Palazzo Giordano (both c. 1780).

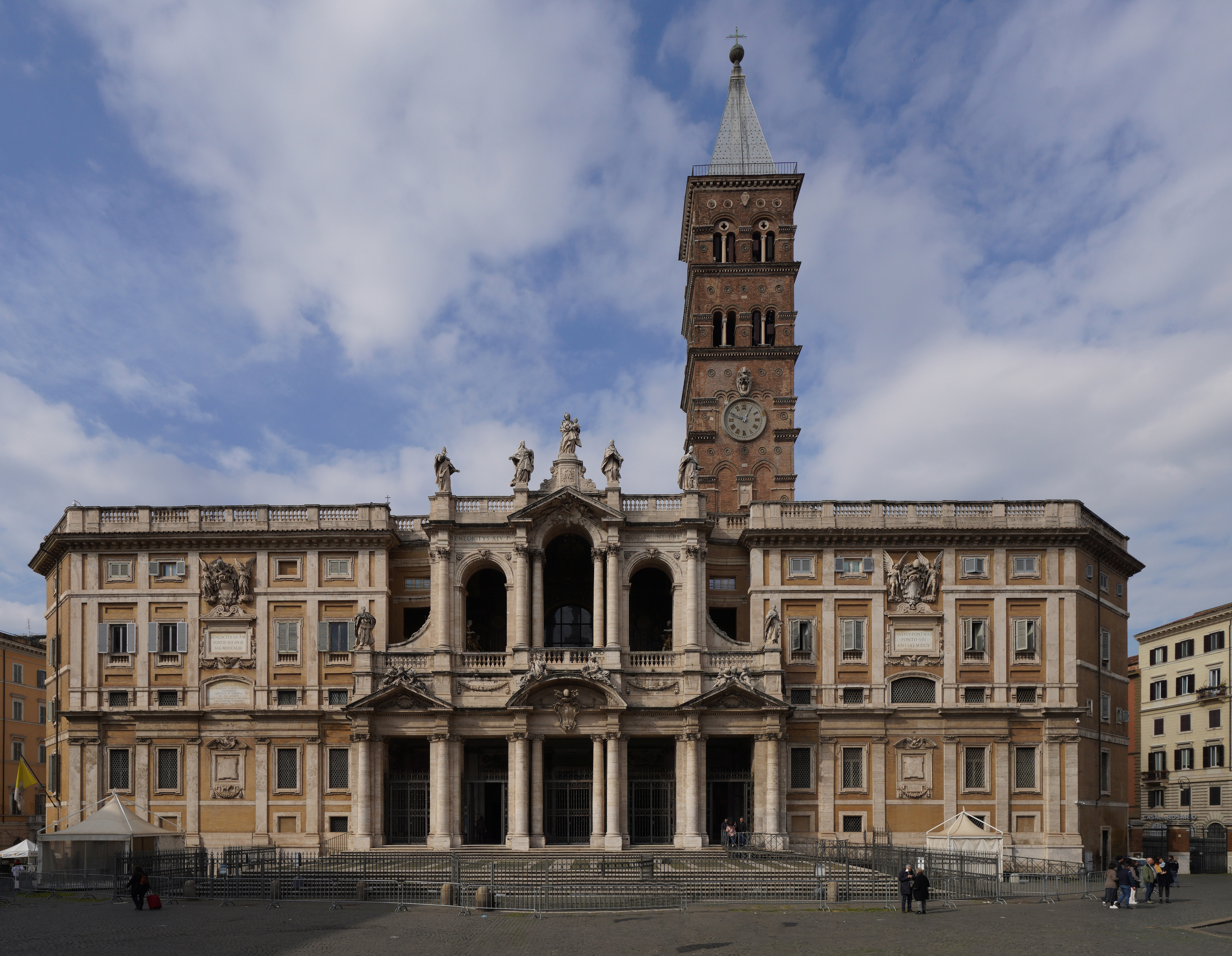
Façade (1743) of Santa Maria Maggiore, Rome

== Early work ==
After studying under Giovanni Battista Foggini, Fuga settled in Rome in 1718. Throughout the 1720s he worked on three projects: submitting a design for the Trevi Fountain in 1723, and 2 designs for façades for the churches San Giovanni in Laterano, 1723, and Santa Maria sopra Minerva, 1725. In 1730, after a brief stay in Naples, Fuga was commissioned by Pope Clement XII to design his family home Palazzo Corsini, Rome and then later to build the Coffee House of the Quirinal Palace as a reception room for Pope Benedict XIV.

His first significant work was in Naples. He was commissioned to design the richly decorated chapel of the Palazzo Cellamare, as well as its rusticated gate to the gardens with a scrolling pediment and a sculptured cartouche of arms, (1726—1727); Fuga's patron was the infamous ambassador, Antonio del Giudice, Prince of Cellamare. Fuga also travelled to Palermo in 1729–1730 in connection with a projected bridge over the Milicia.

== Work in Rome ==
After his return to Rome, he was nominated as the architect of the pontifical palaces by his Florentine countryman Pope Clement XII Corsini, a position later confirmed by Benedict XIV. Fuga's masterwork is the palazzo-like screening façade he erected in front of the basilica of Santa Maria Maggiore (1741–1743). A similar project, considered to be a dry run for the greater project, is the façade he provided for Santa Cecilia in Trastevere. In both cases, care was taken not to mar the mosaics of the medieval fronts that still lie behind Fuga's screens, which provided a narthex for each ancient basilica.

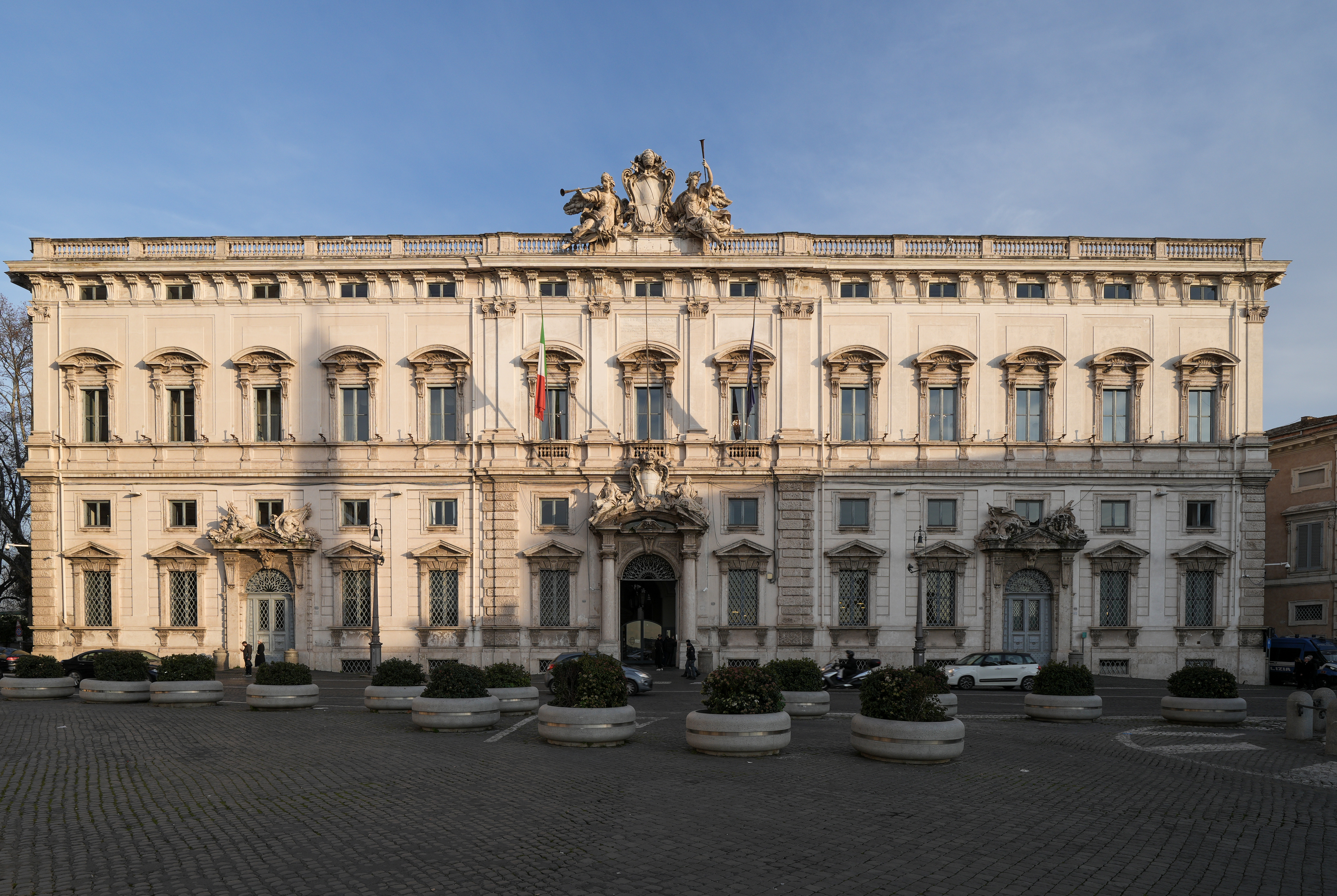
Palazzo della Consulta, Rome.

Among his other major commissions in Rome was the Palazzo della Consulta (1732–1735), which, like the nearby Palazzo Quirinale, fronts the Piazza di Monte Cavallo. Fuga designed the two-storey façade with a piano nobile whose windows have low arched heads set in fielded panels, over a ground floor with low mezzanine. On the lower storey, the panels have channeled rustication and rusticated quoins at the corners. Pilasters are applied only to the central three-bay block, which barely projects, and to the corners.

Between 1730 and 1732, Fuga completed the extension of the Manica Lunga of the Palazzo del Quirinale with the construction of the adjoining building called the Palazzina del Segretario delle Cifre.

The little church of Santa Maria dell’Orazione e Morte (1733–37) was a small project undertaken for the Compagna della buona morte whose role since 1538 had been to give decent burial to the unclaimed corpses of Rome. Fuga was himself a member of this confraternity which possessed its own coemeterium on the banks of the Tiber, since lost to the nineteenth-century construction of the Lungotevere. The previous church of 1575 was demolished in 1733, and Fuga gave the new one an elliptical plan under an elliptical dome. On its crowded façade a triangular pediment encloses a segmental one, both cornices breaking forwards at the center and at the corners; pairs of columns fill the narrow recesses between the wide central bay and the corners, which are emphasized with stacked pilasters. Skulls wreathed with laurel serve as brackets for the pediment of the door.

Various transformations were effected for the relatives of Pope Clement XII Corsini in the Palazzo Riario alla Lungara, which had been modified for Christina, queen of Sweden in the previous century but later became the Palazzo Corsini alla Lungara, purchased on 27 July 1736 from Duke Riario by Don Neri and Don Bartolomeo Corsini, for 70 thousand scudi. After Christina's death in 1689, her sculpture gallery and her library were emptied. Fuga was called in to pull together the 15th and 16th-century amenagements for the Corsini brothers, works which took from 1736 to 1758 before all was finally completed. The Corsini retained Christina's bedroom just as she had left it, and the "urban" front in piazza Fiammetta had to be left untouched, but the weight of her library had produced cracks in the vaulting below it, and repairs to the existing structure were not finished until 1738. Fuga worked on the garden front of the palazzo, beginning with work on the library wing for Neri Corsini. In 1751-53 he added an identical central block containing a theatrical divided staircase, lit with large windows that looked onto the garden parterres, which had been modified and brought up to date in 1741. Then the two were linked with a ground-floor portico. In the interiors, fuga managed in innovative ways to maintain a separation of the functional service circulation from the suites of parade rooms.

In 1742, Pope Benedict XIV commissioned Fuga to rebuild Basilica di Sant'Apollinare. Fuga's commission was completed about 1748.

== Work in Kingdom of Naples ==
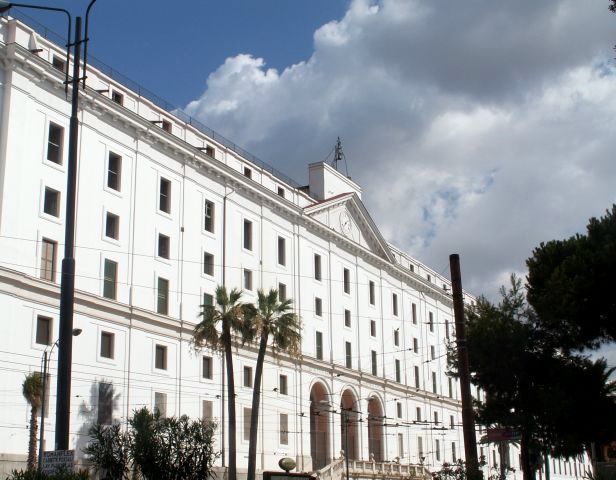
Albergo dei Poveri, Naples.

In 1748, he was called to Naples along with a team under Luigi Vanvitelli, to work for the new Bourbon King of Naples Charles III, King of the Two Sicilies. Here Fuga worked as one of the court architects in renovations to the Naples, where the king and his progressive minister Bernardo Tanucci were changing the face of the city, opening new neighborhoods, driving new arterial avenues and promoting some social and economic modernizations in the backward kingdom. The immediate part of the urban planning involved, for example, the construction of the colossal Albergo dei Poveri with a gray stucco front extending of 354 m. It was intended as a hospice to shelter 8,000 poor from all over the kingdom (segregated by sex and age) but especially the "street people" of Naples, a project which was realized only in part. Fuga's final design, centered on a hexagonal church, devoted one courtyard to each of the intended social classes— men, women, boys and girls—each with their separate entrance. Construction was begun in July 1751. After the departure of King Charles to take over the crown of Spain, work slowed, and when it finally ceased in 1819, three of Fuga's five courts were completed, as they may be seen today, damaged by the earthquake of 1980 and closed.

A second project with an enlightened social cast was the Cimitero delle 366 Fosse ("Cemetery of the 366 Fossae" one for each day of the year) not far from the Albergo, for which Fuga succeeded in obtaining assent from Ferdinand IV in 1762. This project systematized the daily burden of corpses of the poorest Neapolitans that were delivered to the Ospedale and buried in various modes around the outskirts of the city. The cemetery functioned until 1890.

The paving in colored marbles he designed in 1761 for the basilica of Santa Chiara no longer exists, but his Chapel of the Regi Depositi (1766) remains.

In a third vast public project, Fuga also designed the Granili (1779?), which were more than immense public granaries; they also contained a military arsenal and a ropewalk (since demolished). And a third Bourbon public venture was the ceramic manufactory adjoining the park of Caserta (1771–1772).

In Palermo, the Gothic and Romanesque cathedral complex had developed damage from earthquakes. In 1767, Fuga was entrusted with the reconstruction in the interior, the small subsidiary domes over the nave chapels, and the addition of a tall dome over the crossing. The interior has an unexpected simplicity relative to the eclectic jumbles of styles visible from the exterior.

In Naples, Fuga was called upon in 1768 to transform the grand reception room of the Royal Palace, which had been in general disuse since the court had removed to Caserta, into a court theatre. For private clients he constructed numerous palazzi, notably Palazzo Aquino di Caramanico and Palazzo Giordano, as well as villas for aristocratic patrons. He designed the Villa Favorita at Ercolano, in a manner traditional in Italy, has one façade directly on the street, the other giving on to extensive gardens. In his last work, the façade of the Church of the Gerolamini (c. 1780), which belies its date, he remained essentially a fully Baroque architect.

A square, Piazza Ferdinando Fuga, was dedicated to him in the Vomero district, in Naples.

== Sources ==
- Gambardella, Alfonso (December 2001). Ferdinando Fuga. 1699-1999 Roma, Napoli, Palermo. Convegno tenutosi a Napoli nei giorni 25 e 26 ottobre 1999, organizzato dalla Facoltà di Architettura della Seconda Università degli Studi di Napoli (in Italian). Naples: E. S. I.
- Giordano, Paolo (1997). Ferdinando Fuga a Napoli (in Italian). Naples: Edizioni Del Grifo.
- Lucarelli, Francesco (1999). La vita e la morte, dal Real Albergo dei Poveri al Cimitero della 366 Fosse (in Italian). Naples: Edizioni Del Grifo.
