= Villa Favorita, Ercolano =

Coordinates: 40.80029°N 14.35474°E

Villa Favorita
- Villa Favorita
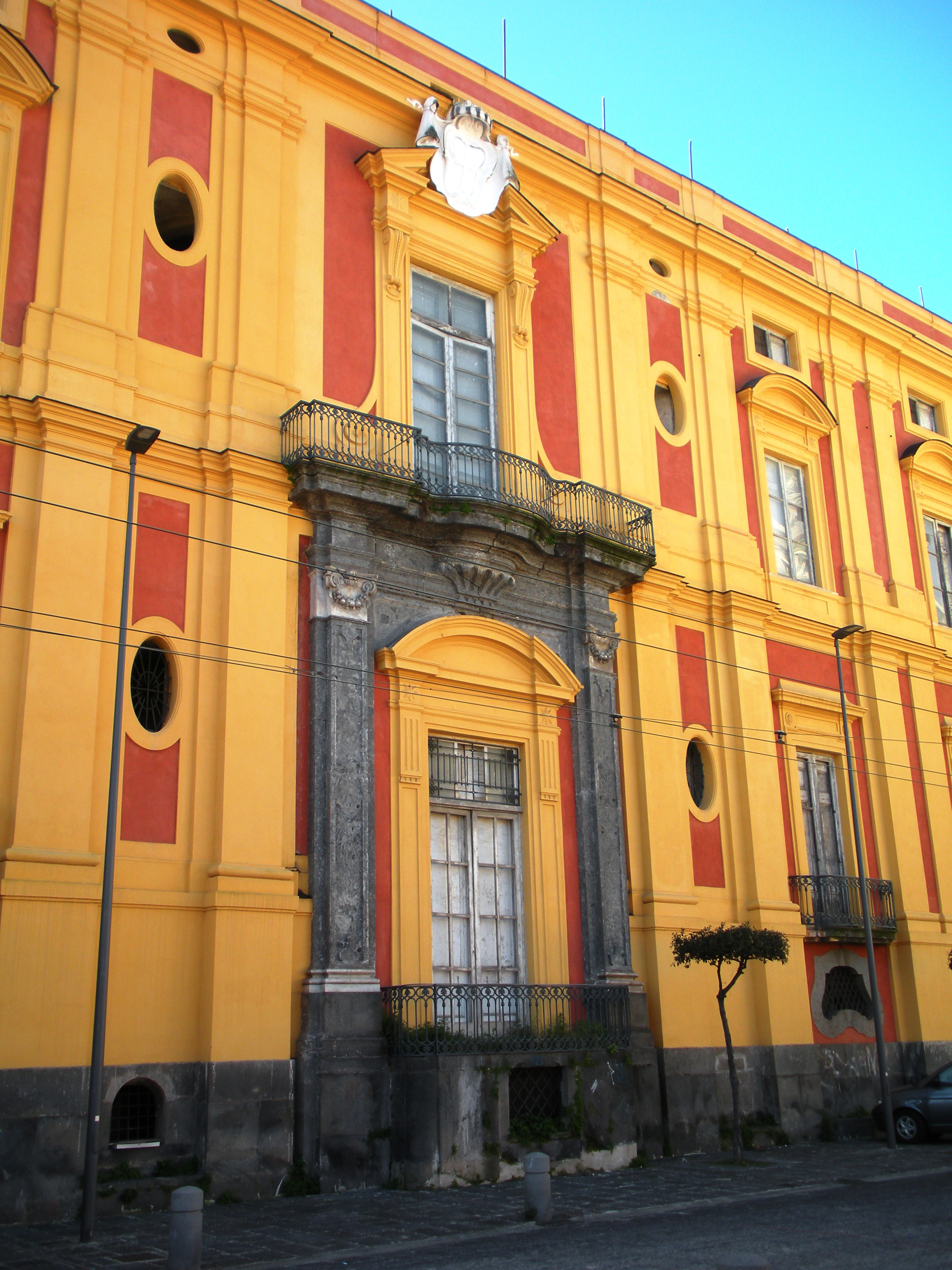
- Palace facade.
- Interactive map of the Villa Favorita area
- Alternative names: Real Villa della Favorita

General information
- Status: Owned by the Italian state, awaiting restoration, possibility of concession of use to private investors
- Type: Villa
- Architectural style: Italian Baroque
- Location: Ercolano, Italy
- Construction started: 1762
- Completed: 1792
- Client: Ferdinand I of the Two Sicilies, Maria Carolina of Austria, Ferdinand II of the Two Sicilies

Technical details
- Floor count: 2

Design and construction
- Architect: Ferdinando Fuga

Villa Favorita, also known as Real Villa della Favorita, was a royal rural palace (villa) in Ercolano, Italy.

== History ==
A small villa previously stood at the site. Prince Giuseppe Beretta, Duke of Simari and Marquis of Mesagne, commissioned designs for a new building from the architect Ferdinando Fuga, and in 1762 the villa was completed. In 1768, the prince gave a sumptuous party in honour of the King Ferdinand IV of Naples and his new wife, the Habsburg Maria Carolina of Austria, just arrived from Vienna. The Queen liked the villa that reminded her of Vienna's Schönbrunn palace and since then was called “Favorita” (favoured). In 1792, the King acquired and expanded the villa, and obtained access to the sea through a great park from the main building on the street to the sea and a pier for the access by boat. It was frequently used by the royal couple and their children.

The second son of the King, Prince Leopold, Prince of Salerno, while living there enlarged the palace and built some pavillons for entertainment, such as the Casino of mosaics (so called after its interior decoration with mother-of-pearl and porcelain scraps). He created an amusement park in the grounds.

From 1879 and 1885 Villa Favorita hosted the exiled Isma'il Pasha, former Khedive of Egypt who had presided over the inauguration of Suez Canal. He decorated the interiors of some of his apartments with a Moorish style.

With a facade overlooking an urban street, the much dilapidated palace is a prime examples of the villas in the Miglio d'Oro or Golden Mile of Villas that occupied the eastern slopes of Vesuvius. The interiors were decorated and frescoed by Andrea Giusti, Domenico Ascione and Filippo De Pascale. The interiors were highly decorated in a florid Rococo style, with stucco, woodwork, mirrors and glasswork. Rooms and halls were painted in various themes and styles, including Etruscan decorations, a stanza of Bacchus and Story of Abraham, and a room (c. 1765) in chinoiserie style. Much of this decoration has been lost. Some stanza retain their fresco decoration including ones by Crescenzo Gamba.
