= Palazzo Giordano a Via Medina, Naples =

Palace in Naples, Italy

Coordinates: 40.842162°N 14.252231°E

The Palazzo Giordano in central Naples, Italy, is a Palace located on via Medina 61 in the Quartiere San Giuseppe of Rione Carita. It is flanked by the contemporary Palazzo d'Aquino di Caramanico to the tall modern NH Ambassador Hotel, two doors down from the also modern Palazzo della Questura, and diagonally across the street from the church of San Diego all'Ospedalletto. The palace has had many owners, and variously called Palazzo Carafa di Noja and Palazzo Caracciolo di Forino.

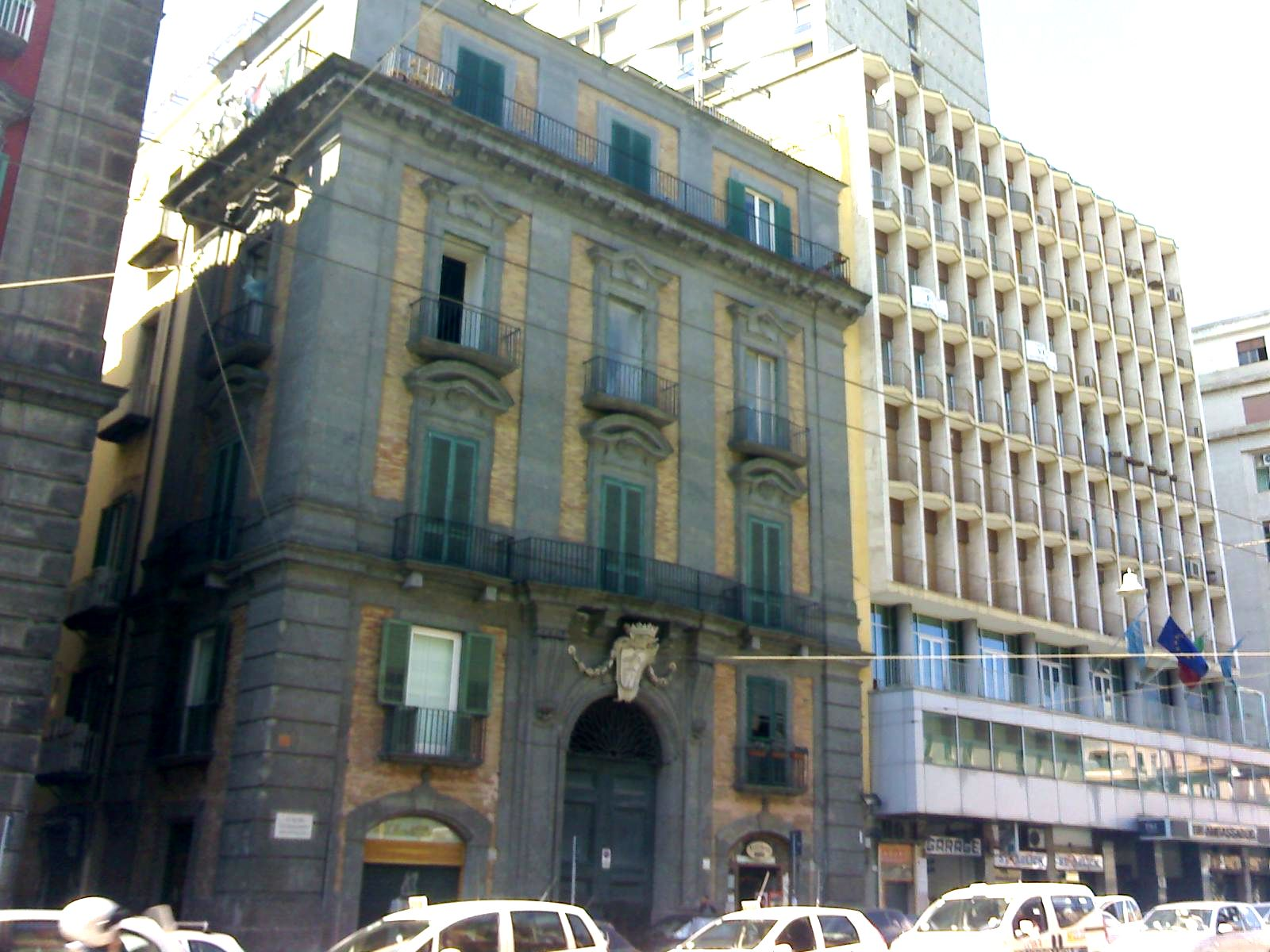
Principal Facade

Originally the palace of the Duke Giuseppe Giordano, the present structure was completed in 1761 by the architect Giuseppe Alviani, using a late-Baroque design on paper by Ferdinando Fuga.
