= Metronapoli =

Italian transport company, 2000–2013

- Company type: Joint stock
- Industry: Transportation
- Founded: 26 July 2000
- Defunct: 31 October 2013
- Successor: Azienda Napoletana Mobilità s.p.a. (ANM)
- Headquarters: Naples, Italy
- Services: Public transport (Metro system and funicular cable railway)
- Number of employees: 550
- Parent: Comune di Napoli

Metronapoli SpA was an Italian company responsible for the provision of public transport in the city of Naples, and its primary function was the operation and maintenance of the Naples Metro system. It was founded on 26 July 2000 and became operational on 1 February 2001. Metronapoli was a fully state-controlled joint-stock corporation. Its functions were absorbed by Azienda Napoletana Mobilità s.p.a. (ANM) on 1 November 2013.

Metronapoli was a subsidiary company controlled by two organisations, initially three. From 2001 to 2005, the Comune di Napoli (City of Naples government) had a 51% holding stake in the company shares, giving them a controlling ownership, while Trenitalia held a 38% stake and ANM held the remaining 11%. Trenitalia sold its shares to the municipal government in November 2005, and at the end of 2005 the latter's stake had grown to 99%, with just 1% owned by ANM.

Metronapoli operated the transport services and maintenance of Line 1 and Line 6 of the metro system, as well as the four funicular railways (Central Funicular, Chiaia Funicular, Mergellina Funicular and Montesanto Funicular).

Metronapoli also operated Line 2, a commuter rail line, from 2001 until 2005. Operation of line 2 was taken over by Trenitalia in November 2005.
