= Palazzo d'Aquino di Caramanico, Naples =

Palace in Naples, Italy

Palazzo d'Aquino di Caramanico
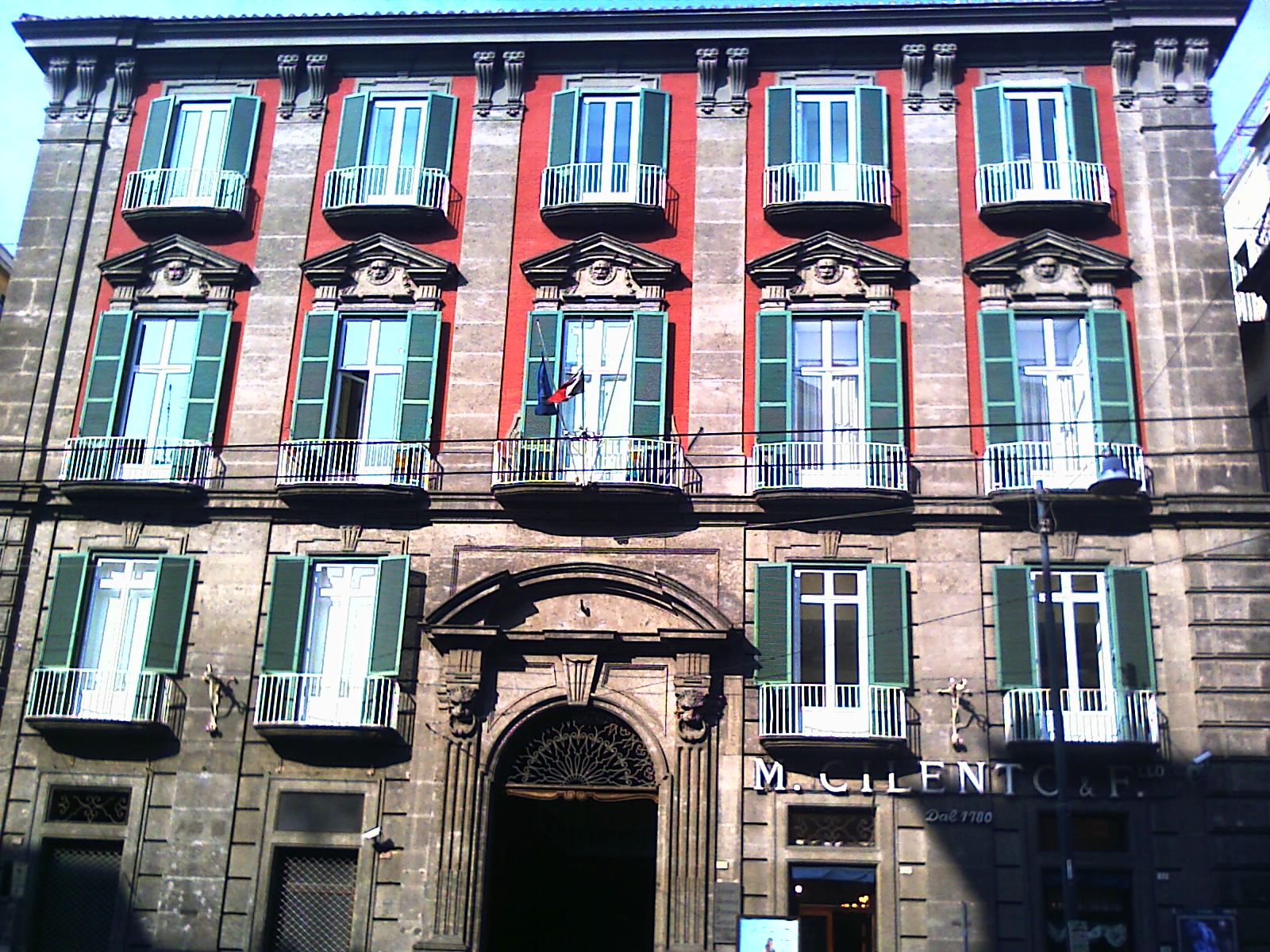
- Principal facade

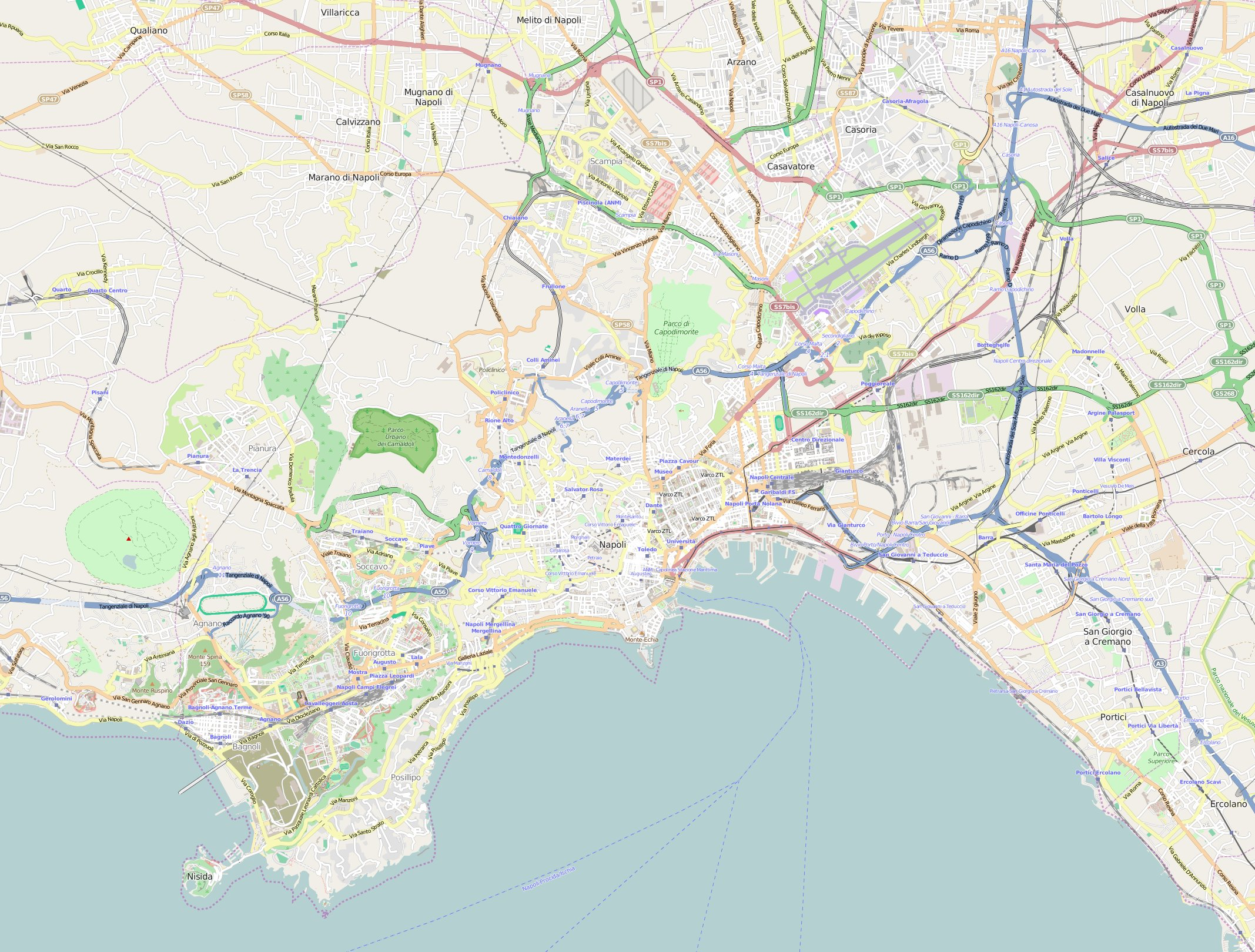
- Location in Naples

General information
- Type: Palace
- Architectural style: Rococo
- Location: Via Medina, Quartiere San Giuseppe, Rione Carità, Naples, Italy
- Coordinates: 40.841950°N 14.252167°E
- Construction started: 1775
- Completed: 1780

Design and construction
- Architect: Ferdinando Fuga

The Palazzo d'Aquino di Caramanico in central Naples, Italy, is a Palace located on via Medina in the Quartiere San Giuseppe of Rione Carita. It is flanked by the contemporary Palazzo Giordano and two doors down from the tall modern NH Ambassador Hotel.

The Rococo architect Ferdinando Fuga worked on construction during 1775 and 1780 of this palace (and played a large role in the design of the adjacent Palazzo Giordano. The interior was frescoed by Giovanni Funaro and Nicola Malinconico. During 1927, the palace became offices of the Fascist party.
