= Central funicular (Italy) =

Railway line in Naples, Italy

Coordinates: 40.8406°N 14.2414°E

Central Funicular
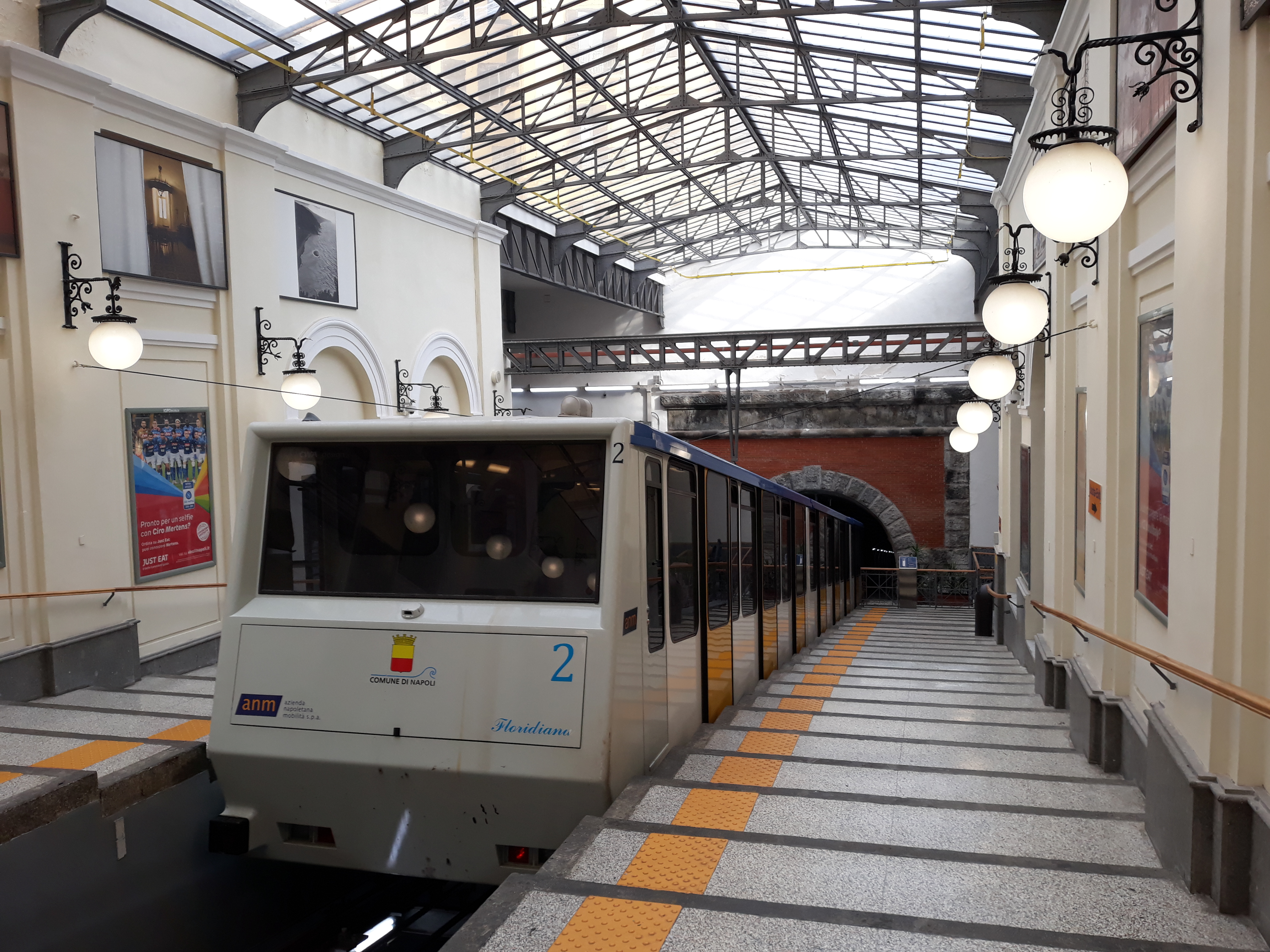

Overview
- Native name: Funicolare Centrale
- Status: in use
- Locale: Naples, Italy
- Stations: 4

Service
- Type: Funicular
- Operator(s): 1975–95: ATAN; 1995–2001: ANM; 2001–13: Metronapoli; 2013 to date: ANM

History
- Opened: 1928

Technical
- Line length: 1.234 km (0.767 mi)
- Track gauge: 1,200 mm (3 ft 11 1/4 in)

The Central Funicular (Italian: Funicolare Centrale), is one of four funiculars in the public transportion system of Naples, Italy. The system is a true funicular: an inclined railway with two passenger cars, connected via cables, operating in concert.

Inaugurated in 1928, the Central Funicular of Naples is one of the most used funicular railways in the world, and carries over 10 million passengers per year.

The Central Funicular connects its upper terminus in Vomero with its lower terminus at Via Toledo near Galleria Umberto via four stations: Piazza Fuga, Petraio-Via Palizzi (accessing the Vomero Petraio), Corso Vittorio Emanuele (Napoli), and Augusteo at Piazzetta Duca d'Aosta. At Piazza Fuga, the Central Funicular station is adjacent to Piazza Fuga, near Piazza Vanvitelli, where there is a connection to both Vanvitelli station, on Line 1 of the Naples Metro, and to the Chiaia Funicular.

The Montesanto Funicular is a short walk to the northeast. A fourth funicular, the Mergellina Funicular, connects the two further areas of Posillipo Alto and Mergellina. A now defunct system, the Sorrento Funicular, operated nearby from 1883 to 1886.

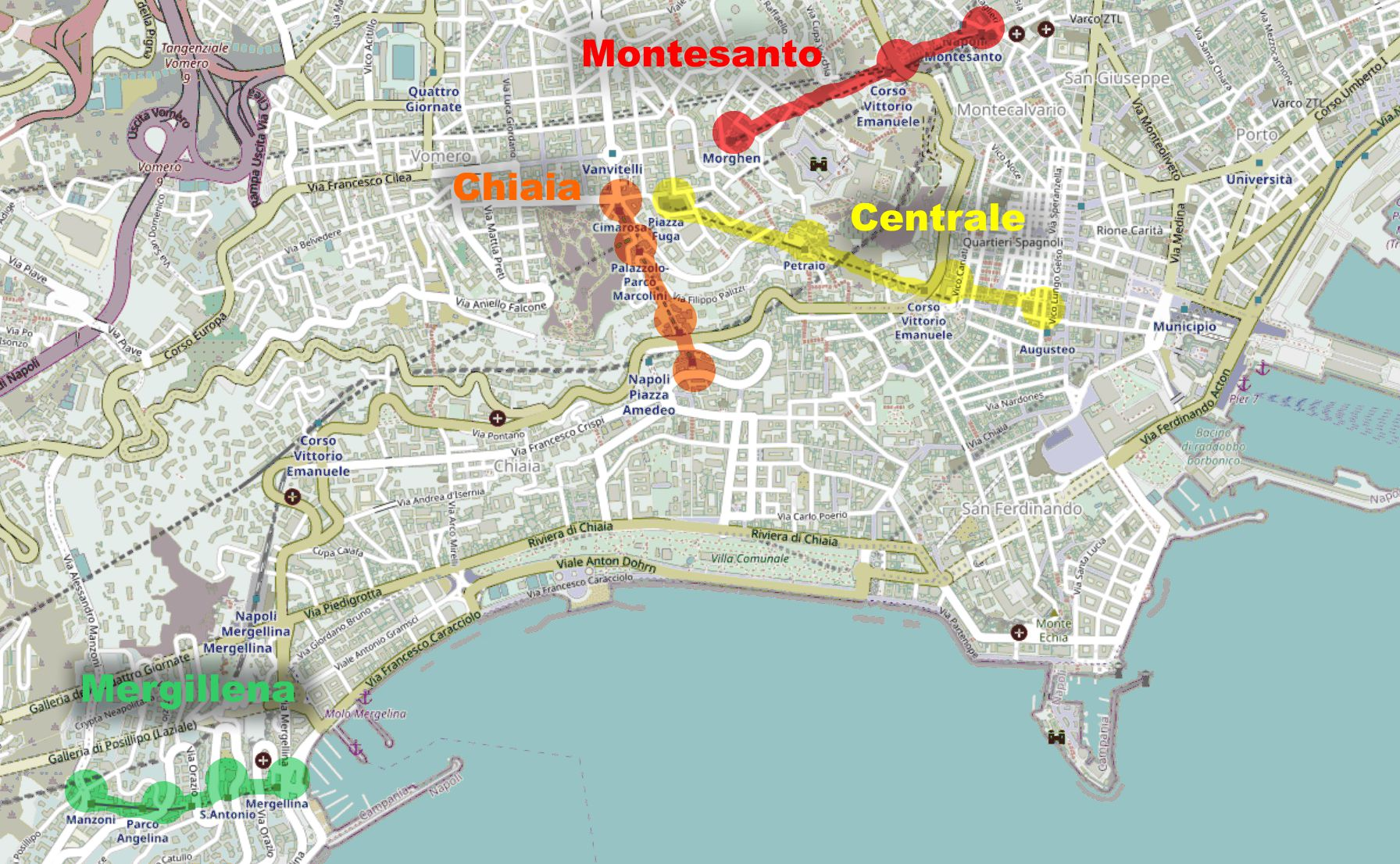
The four operating funicular systems of Naples, Italy

== History ==
In the first two decades of the 20th century, a dramatic increase in the number of people travelling downhill from Piazza Vanvitelli to Central Naples led to a need to provide a public transport option for the steep decline. A route between via Toledo and Piazza Fuga (adjacent to Piazza Vanvitelli) was settled on, with intermediate stops at Corso Vittorio Emanuele (near Cariati) and Petraio. Due to the difficult nature of the steep slope, it was decided early on that a funicular line would provide the best option for the route.

The route the line would follow was surveyed and constructed by a company known as SAFUCE, the electronic and mechanical aspects were completed by the company Ceretti & Tanfani, and the cars by O.F.M. An innovative traction facility was installed utilising twin Ward Leonard groups with dynamic repulsion batteries, and the cars driven by 300 hp (220 kW) Marelli engines. The entire system was connected to a buffer battery, ensuring continuous service for over an hour if the power failed, allowing all cars to descend prior to cut off of power supply.

Construction took just over two years, and the Central Funicular was opened to much fanfare on 28 October 1928. The line proved immediately popular, providing great relief from the gruelling climb up the steep slope. The line operated continuously (including during World War II) until 1976, when control was transferred from SAFUCE to ATAN. ATAN decided that the line desperately required modernisation work, which finally began in 1989.

By 1990, the line was being regularly closed to allow work to be undertaken. A tender was put out to refit both the lines and cars, and this was undertaken by Ceretti & Tanfani, who sub-contracted various aspects of their project to firms including Fondedile, Raiole, Del Vecchio, and Icla. After a reasonably trouble free project, with few delays, the whole renovation project was completed, and re-opened on 27 October 1991, one day short of the line's 63rd anniversary. Further electronic and mechanical works were carried out in 1994 by Sigla di Forli, who sub-contracted Leitner S.p.A. and E.E.I. (Equipaggiamenti Elettronici Industriali) for operational controls, and I.E.G fitted new 300 kW (400 hp) -540 V engines. The second project was completed and re-opening of the line occurred on 25 April (Liberation Day), 1996.

In 2001, responsibility for operation of the line was transferred from Azienda Napoletana Mobilità (ANM) (ATAN's successor in 1995) to Metronapoli, but it was transferred back to ANM in November 2013.

== Operation ==
The Central Funicular is one of the longest funicular lines in the world, and with over 10 million passengers carried annually, has the largest capacity. It carries an average of 28,000 passengers on workdays, but this is reduced to an average of 10,000 on weekends and holidays.

From the top to bottom the line is 1,270 metres (4,167 ft) long, but ascends 170 metres (558 ft) in altitude, at an average gradient of 13%. The carriages travel at an average speed of 7 metres per second (22.97 ft/s), and the entire route takes four minutes and twenty seconds. Each train can carry 420 passengers at a time, giving a total capacity of 6,200 passengers per hour in each direction.

== Popular culture ==
- In the Japanese anime JoJo's Bizarre Adventure: Golden Wind, the first battle between Giorno Giovanna and Bruno Bucciarati takes place on the Central Funicular.

== Stations ==
- Piazza Fuga Station
- Petraio-Via Palizzi Station
- Corso Vittorio Emanuele Station
- Augusteo Station

== See also ==
- List of funicular railways
- List of Naples metro stations
- List of rapid transit systems
