= Coemeterium =

Type of cemetery

Coemeterium (Latin for "cemetery", from the Ancient Greek, κοιμητήριον, koimeterion = "bedroom, resting place") was originally a free-standing, multi-roomed gravesite in Early Christianity. Bodies were buried in wall niches and under the floor. In later times coemeterium became synonymous with cemetery, which, like the French cimetière, was derived from the Latin word.

== Literature ==
- Hugo Brandenburg: Coemeterium. Der Wandel des Bestattungswesens als Zeichen des Kulturumbruchs der Spätantike. In: Laverna, No. 5, Scripta Mercaturae, St. Katharinen, 1994, pp. 206–233, ISSN 0938-5835.
- Steffen Diefenbach: Römische Erinnerungsräume: Heiligenmemoria und kollektive Identitaten im Rom des 3. bis 5. Jahrhunderts n. Chr. De Gruyter, 2007, ISBN 978-3-110-19129-5 (= Millennium Studien, Vol. 11; Zu Kultur und Geschichte des ersten Jahrtausend, a dissertation at the University of Münster, 2004).
