= Palazzo della Questura, Naples =

Building in Naples, Italy

Coordinates: 40.8428°N 14.2520°E

The Palazzo della Questura (Police Headquarters) of Naples, Italy, is a building located on Via Medina and Via Armando Diaz. ALong Via Medina, it is located adjacent to the tall modern NH Ambassador hotel, and two doors north from the Baroque Palazzo Giordano. North of the Questura is the contemporary, and equally imposing, Palazzo delle Poste.

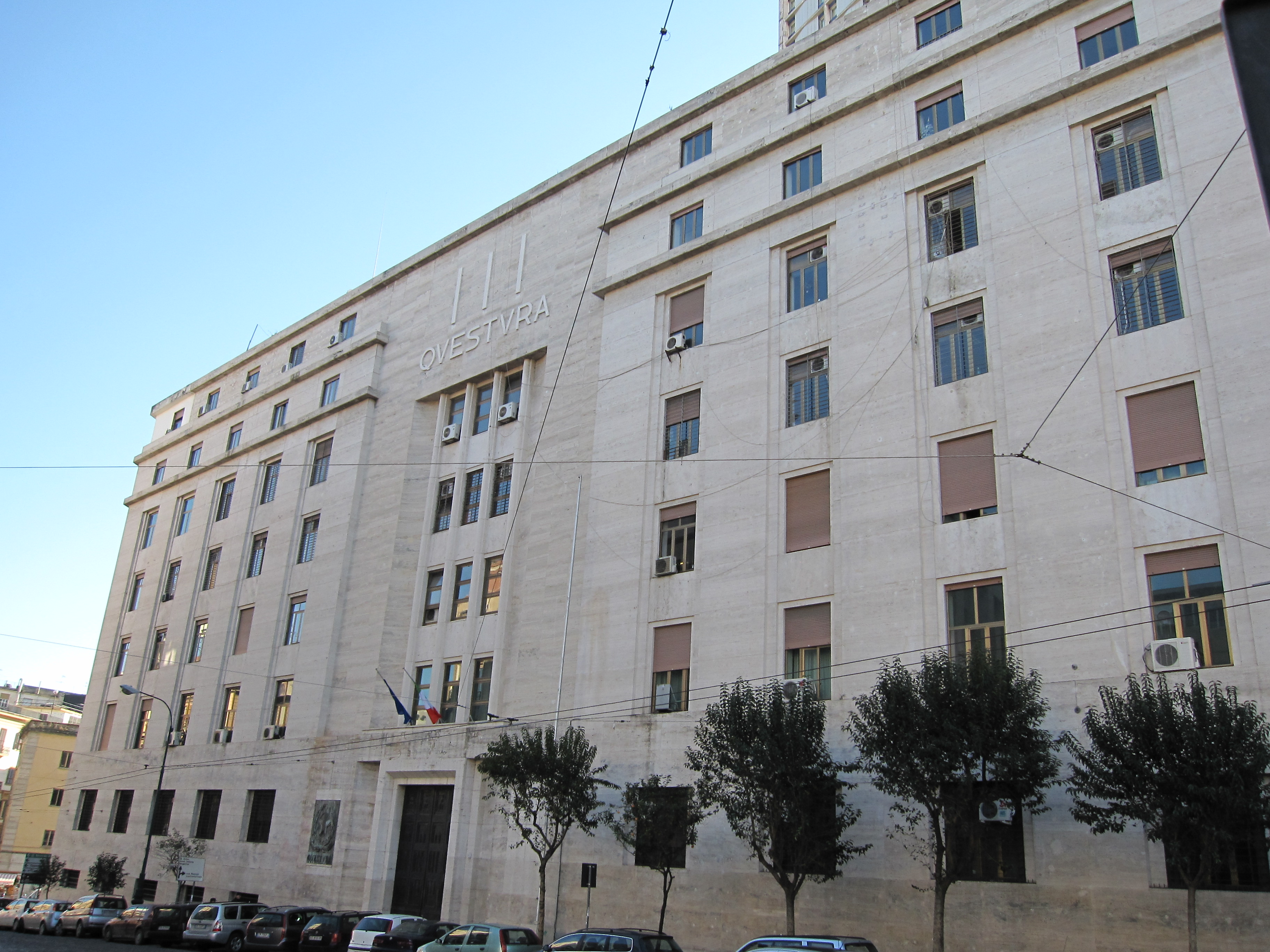
Principal Facade on Piazza Matteotti

The building is an example of Fascist architecture, built in 1935-1938 to be the new headquarters of the police. Work ceased in February, 1939, due to inability to obtain iron building materials, due to the re-arming of the country, and international embargoes, and inauguration delayed till 1940. The style is severe and monumental, imposing an unharmonious and somewhat bullying facade relative to older nearby buildings. The words QVESTVRA recall Latin script popular with fascists, seeking to associate a resurgent Italy with Roman past. Flanking the portal, there was originally two reliefs depicting the Kingdom of Italy and the fascist eagle. Both were replaced by the symbol of the Italian Republic, the broken wheel. There are still symbols such as fasces and eagles that remain as part of the integral decoration.

== Bibliografia ==
- AA.VV., Napoli e dintorni, Touring club italiano, 2001
