= Sorrento funicular =

Coordinates: 40.62867°N 14.2332°E

Sorrento Funicular
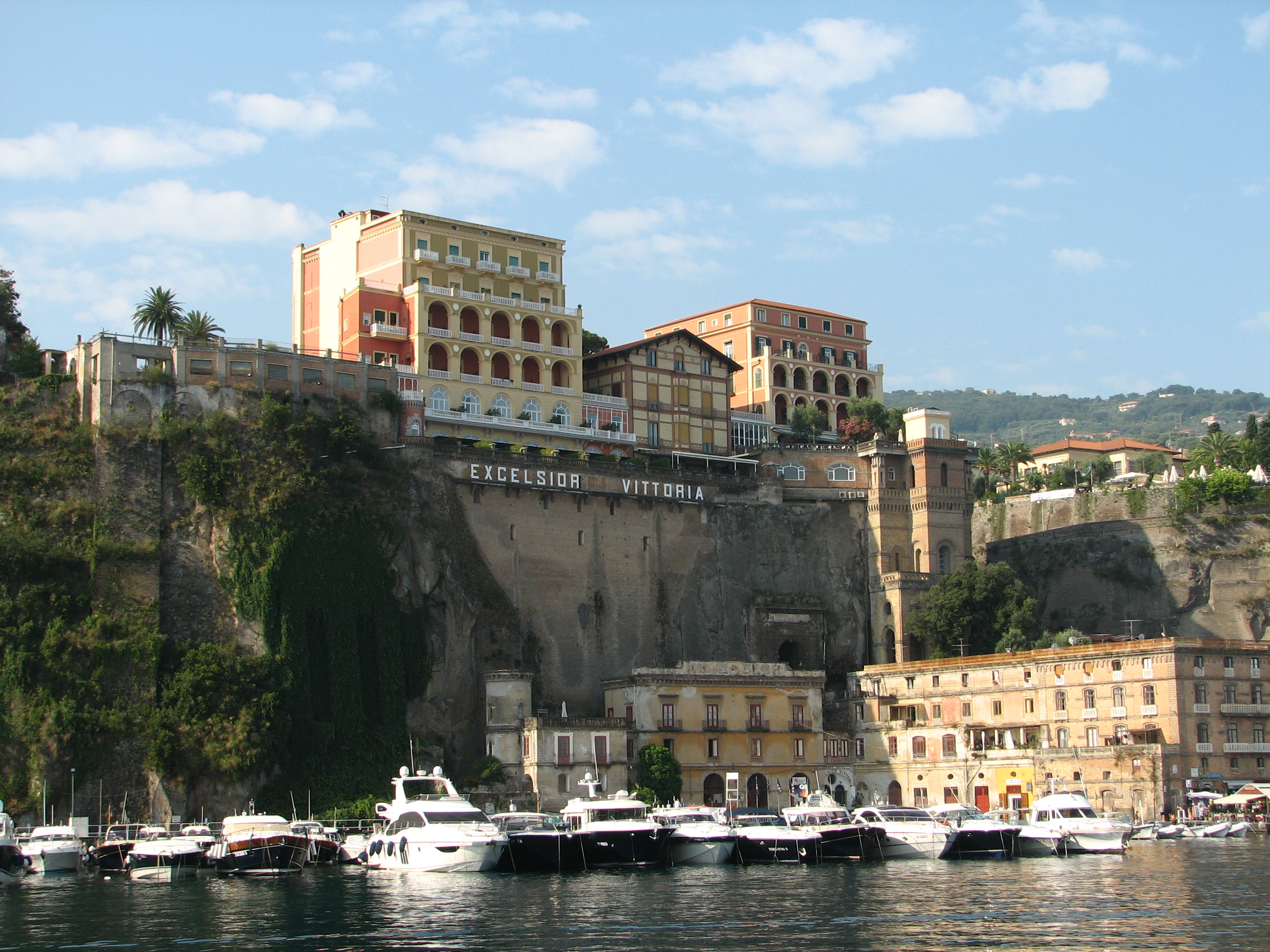
- Hotel Vittoria with former lower terminus

Overview
- Native name: Funicolare di Sorrento
- Status: Defunct
- Locale: Sorrento, Municipality of Naples
- Stations: 2

Service
- Type: Inclined Railway, marketed as a Funicular
- System: Steam-driven

History
- Opened: 1883

Technical
- Line length: 0.26 km (0.16 mi)

The Sorrento Funicular was a steam-driven, inclined rail system located in the commune of Sorrento, within the Municipality of Naples, Italy — connecting its upper terminus at Sorrento's Hotel Vittoria to the resort's port, several hundred feet below on the Gulf of Naples. The system was designed by Italian engineer Alessandro Ferretti (1851–1930), began operating in 1883 and stopped operating approximately three years later.

Using only a single passenger car, the system was a funicular in name only, as a funicular by definition counterbalances two cars attached to opposite ends of the same pully-driven cable, operating in concert.

== History ==
The rail system partially used a tunnel cut into the tufa stone of Sorrento's cliffs by the Romans, precisely to connect the Marina Piccola (small marina) area with the upper town. The inaugural run took place on March 5, 1893.

The funicular was 260 meters long, with 170 meters inside the Roman tunnel and the remaining section, outdoors. Running on a track with a 15% slope, the single passenger car held 12 passengers and was driven by a steam engine making 8 HP, enough to also power Hotel Vittoria's electric lighting. Fares uphill were 20 cents per person in 1st class and 15 cents per person in 2nd class. Descent fares were 15 cents per person in 1st class and 10 cents in 2nd class.

In 1894 the Municipality of Sorrento entered into negotiations with the owners of the hotel to make the system public, in advance of a large number of tourists expected for the upcoming 400th anniversary marking the death of Sorrento-born poet Torquato Tasso — in 1885. Complicating matters, during the summer, the steam-driven machinery required 12 cubic meters of water daily, exceeding available supplies either in nearby cisterns or in Sorrento's Valle dei Mulini (Valley of Mills). The system found its water supply when it was discovered that water stored in the Spasiano cisterns, intended for drinking water, wasn't potable. Additionally, by 1898, the owners of Hotel Vittoria had noted complaints by the hotel's exclusive clientele who appreciated neither the loud operation of the funicular nor the traffic through the hotel of passengers who weren't hotel guests.

The funicular was quickly rendered obsolete by the newly constructed adjacent road and the hotel's own newly constructed elevator to the port.

== See also ==
- See: Vallone dei Mulini at Wikipedia Italiano
- List of funicular railways
- List of Naples metro stations
