= Via San Giacomo dei Capri =

Street in Naples, Italy

- Location: Naples, Italy
- Quarter: Arenella
- Postal code: 80128, 80131
- From: Via Pietro Castellino, Via Vincenzo Migliaro and Via Giambattista Ruoppolo
- To: Via Domenico Fontana

Via San Giacomo dei Capri is a street in Naples, Italy, in the Arenella quarter, linking the Vomero district to the Rione Alto area. Its route is fairly winding, climbing through a series of bends towards the hilly part of the city. It is one of the main streets of Arenella and, together with the parallel Via Gabriele Jannelli, one of the two historic thoroughfares of Rione Alto.

== History ==
Several theories have been advanced to explain the origin of the street's name.

According to the historian Gino Doria, the irregular course of the street reflects an old pastoral track. Until the years after the First World War, the pastures of Rione Alto were grazed by goats, and the custom of an Easter Monday outing to the Villaggio dei Cangiani, where cheese and other produce from the Colli Aminei were sold, is said to have lasted into the 1950s. Some accounts also mention a wayside shrine to Saint James along the same track, although no documentary evidence for this has been found.

Romualdo Marrone took a different view. Surviving records, he argued, show that the land crossed by the street belonged to the monks of the Certosa di San Giacomo on the island of Capri, who gradually sold it off to private owners over the centuries. Between the eighteenth and nineteenth centuries the area was occupied by a number of holiday villas, among them Villa Tammaro, Villa Clemenza, Villa Tafuri, Villa Giordano and Villa Valentino, of which only a few survive. Villa Valentino and the nearby Cappella Marsiglia, still standing on the bend near the top of the climb, are cited as evidence that the street has existed for at least five centuries. The land may indeed have belonged to the Capri monks, but the area continued to be used by shepherds until the early twentieth century, a custom that in time attached the name of the street to goats, in much the same way that Capri itself is traditionally said to have taken its own name from the goats once bred there.

A more general local tradition simply links the "dei Capri" of the name to flocks that once grazed freely in what was then a wooded area, when shepherds and farmers travelled through the city selling milk door to door; the nearby Via Salvator Rosa is said to have served the same purpose. A further tradition holds instead that the name recalls a small convent once dedicated to Saint James.

== Description ==
The street begins at the junction with Via Pietro Castellino, Via Vincenzo Migliaro and Via Giambattista Ruoppolo, on the border between the Vomero and Arenella quarters, and climbs in a series of hairpin bends towards the upper part of the city, in the direction of Rione Alto.

Partway up the hill stands the Sanctuary of Santa Maria della Rotonda, which faces onto Via Pietro Castellino but can also be reached directly from Via San Giacomo dei Capri. Nearby is the enclosed convent of the Passionist nuns of Maria Santissima Assunta. The convent and its church were built on the initiative of the Passionist father Enrico Castaldo in the late 1950s, and the nuns moved into the new building when the church opened for worship in 1962. The Passionist sisters had arrived in Naples in 1928 at the request of Cardinal Alessio Ascalesi, first settling in a small convent that was later demolished. An earlier, undated document places on the same site, described as being "on the slope of San Giacomo dei Capri", an older Carmelite convent known as "Vitale", attached to a rural building that included farmers' dwellings and communal wash-houses once used by the laundresses of Vomero and Arenella. The Congregation of the Sisters of the Sorrowful Mother and the Holy Cross also has a house on the street.

Further up, on a bend near the top of the climb, stand Villa Valentino and the neighbouring Cappella Marsiglia. The villa was built in 1889 for the commendatore Giovanni Valentino as a holiday residence, and is remembered for the custom, kept by the household staff, of placing two white porcelain greyhound statues on its tower to announce the family's arrival.

The street is served by the Montedonzelli and Rione Alto stations of Naples Metro Line 1.

== Bibliography ==
- Doria, Gino. Le strade di Napoli. Milan: Ricciardi, 1982.
- Marrone, Romualdo. Le strade di Napoli. Rome: Newton Compton, 1992.
