= Via Pietro Castellino =

Street in Naples, Italy

- Interactive map of Via Pietro Castellino
- Namesake: Pietro Castellino
- Location: Arenella, 5th municipality of Naples
- Postal code: 80128, 80131
- Nearest metro station: Metro Line 1 (Montedonzelli, Rione Alto)

Via Pietro Castellino is one of the main thoroughfares of the hilly area of Naples, in the district of Arenella (5th municipality), in the area known as Rione Alto. It is named after the physician Pietro Castellino.

== History ==
The street was built in the first half of the 20th century, as part of the works connected with the construction of the Antonio Cardarelli Hospital, the largest hospital in Southern Italy. Like the other major thoroughfares of Rione Alto and the Colli Aminei built at the same time, including via Bernardo Cavallino and the present-day viale Colli Aminei, it was designed to be long, wide, and free of private buildings, so as to allow the rapid passage of ambulances.

The street is named after Pietro Castellino, a physician and clinician who for many years held the chair of medical pathology at the University of Naples Federico II in Naples, succeeding Antonio Cardarelli as head of the First Medical Clinic; he was also a member of parliament and distinguished himself in relief efforts following the 1908 Messina earthquake.

== Description and places of interest ==
The street runs near the so-called hospital district (zona ospedaliera), which is served by a dedicated exit of the Naples ring road; it is served by the Montedonzelli station on Line 1 of the Naples Metro, as well as by several surface bus lines. As well as being a busy residential and commercial street, it is home to several notable sites the Napoli 1 Territorial Research Area of the National Research Council (known as the Castellino Campus), at number 111, which brings together numerous research institutes and is an important biotechnology hub;, the nearby, the Antonio Cardarelli Hospital;, and the church of Santa Maria della Rotonda, at number 67.

== Bibliography ==
- Marrone, Romualdo. Le strade di Napoli. Rome: Newton Compton, 2004.
