= Cappella Cangiani =

Church in Naples, Italy

Coordinates: 40.863410°N 14.219980°E

The Cangiani Chapel or Cappella Cangiani is a modern Roman Catholic church in Rione Alto, on via Mariano Semmola in the quartiere Arenella of Naples, Italy.

== History ==
A chapel on the site, owned by the Cangiani family, was known since the 16th century. Religious buildings were replaced over the century. In 1969, construction of the present modern church, by architect Alberto Izzo, aimed to create a parish church center, with consecration in 1976. Inside there is a Crucifix carved by Michelangelo Naccherino and brought here from the ancient church of dell'Incoronata in via Medina.
