= Rione Alto =

District of Naples

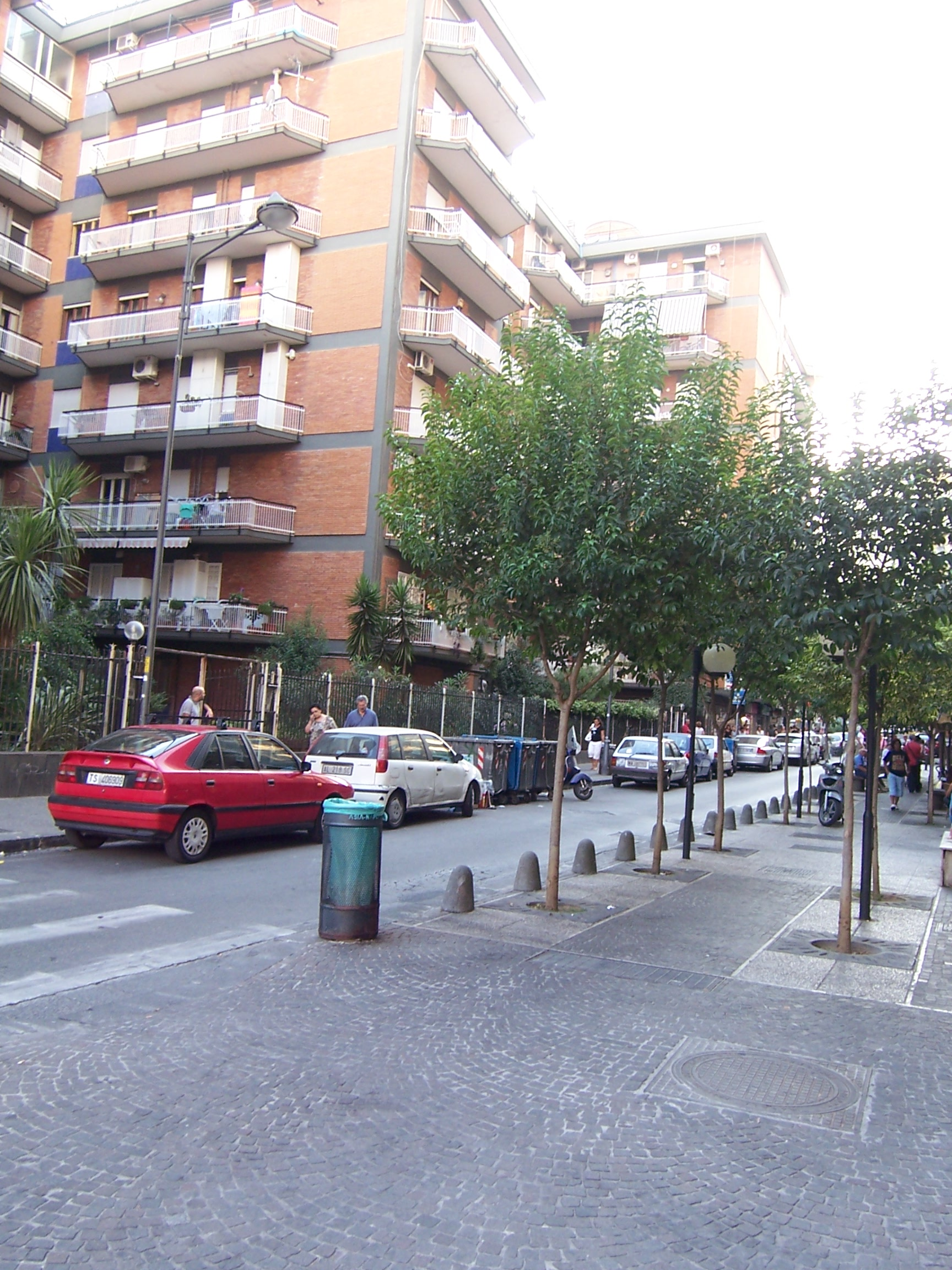
Via Giulio Palermo, Rione Alto.

Rione Alto is a district of Naples, built at the turn of the 1960s and 70s in the Arenella district, near the hospital area.

== Etymology and history ==
It owes its name to the fact that it is located in the highest (in Italian, alto) part of the Vomero hill, a very sparsely populated rural area until the mid-twentieth century, built in an imposing way only in the sixties, when the spaces in Vomero ran out, the restriction of inability to build around the Giovanni Pascale hospital was circumvented, thus making possible one of the most profitable speculative interventions in the urban history of Naples, determined by the very high increase in value acquired by the building areas of the Rione Alto.

The entrepreneur and engineer Corrado Ferlaino talked about the construction of the neighborhood in an interview:

Roma (in Italian), "Comprai tutti i suoli ai Colli Aminei e al Rione Alto. Qui feci una bella lottizzazione e furono costruiti 10/12mila appartamenti, praticamente una cittadina grande come Sorrento. Il toponimo Rione Alto l'ho scelto io per dare al complesso residenziale un nome nobile. [...] Per la lottizzazione del Rione Alto ero in società al 50% con Enrico Verga, figlio di un medico e professore universitario molto importante."

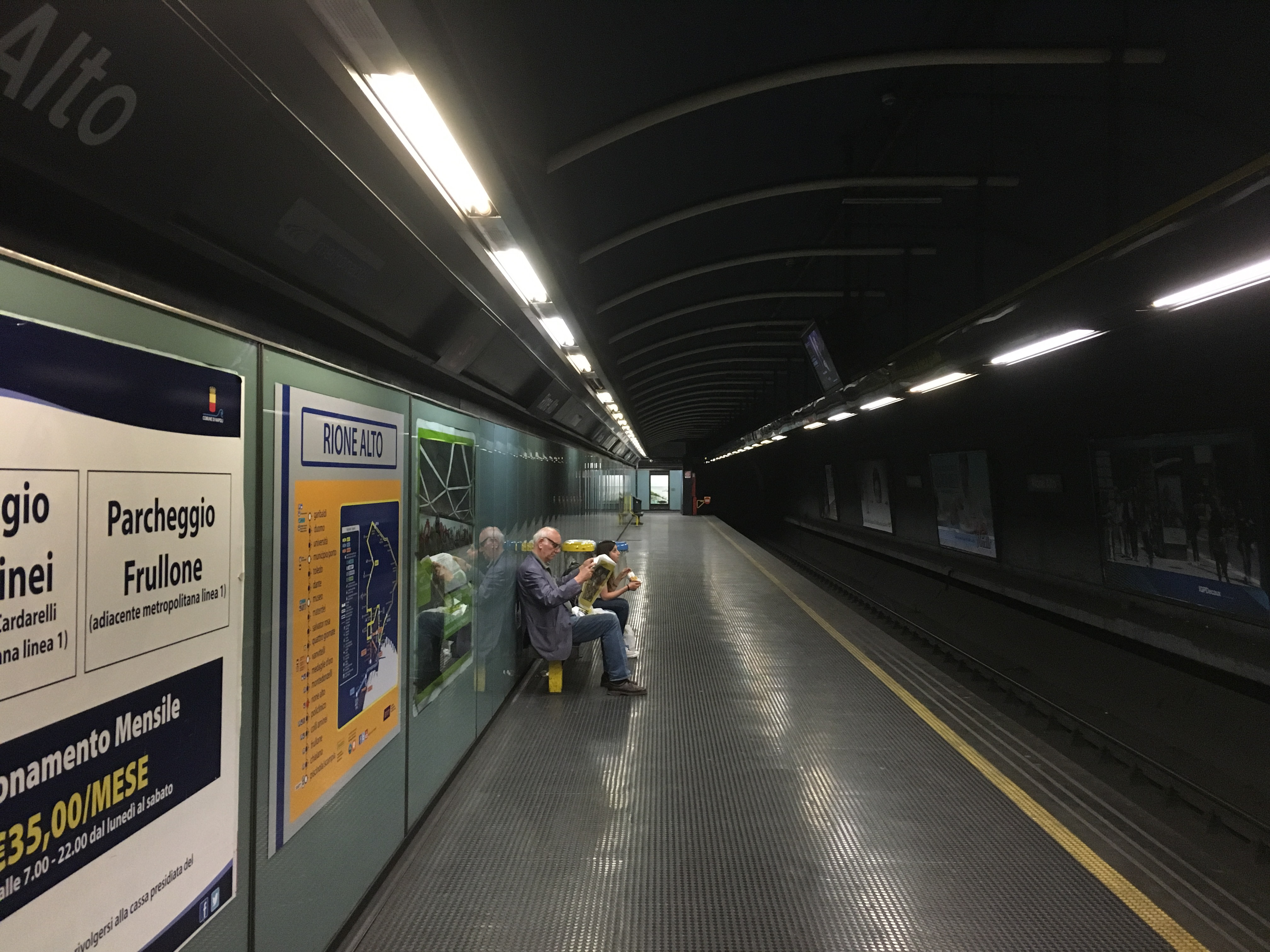
Rione Alto Station, Line 1

== Urban planning ==
The structure of the Rione Alto is mainly made up of a network of rather narrow streets, resulting from the small spaces left free between the various buildings, built without any order.

The two main streets of the district, via Jannelli and Via San Giacomo dei Capri, have remained the same in length, width and route compared to their conditions in the past centuries, when they were only used for goats and agricultural carts. In particular, via Jannelli is heavily trafficked because it connects the Rione Alto to the Camaldoli junction of the Naples ring road.

The Rione Alto was one of the first areas to be served by the new Collinare Metro (later Line 1) with the Rione Alto station, which allowed easy mobility towards the center of Vomero.

== Architecture ==
Being an area of recent urbanization, the Rione Alto has few pre-existing buildings, however all strongly altered by the profound changes that took place in the last thirty years of the twentieth century. Added to this is the lack of real social gathering centers (squares, gardens) due to the excesses of speculative construction, so much so that the subsequent construction of the Rione Alto station of Line 1 of the underground, as there are no further spaces useful for the purpose, has resulted in a significant narrowing of the roadway (necessarily occupied by the relative entrances and descents, as well as by the station well) of Via Pasquale del Torto and part of via Giulio Palermo, which also entailed substantial variations to the viability of the entire ward with the establishment of one-way streets in various streets.

=== Cappella Cangiani ===
In the area of Largo dei Cangiani there was in the past a small agricultural settlement around the Cappella Cangiani, a small church containing an icon of Santa Maria di Costantinopoli, built at the end of the sixteenth century by the Cangiano family, who had considerable possessions in those parts. At the turn of the nineteenth and twentieth centuries, after a restoration of the church, a larger church was built near it, which became an autonomous parish (Parrocchia di Santa Maria di Costantinopoli in Cappella Cangiani) from 1925, restored in 1951. Between in 1969 and 1976, as a consequence of the demographic explosion of Vomero Alto, the current new church was built on a project by the neapolitan Alberto Izzo, with an airy new layout, in which ancient testimonies are well absorbed.

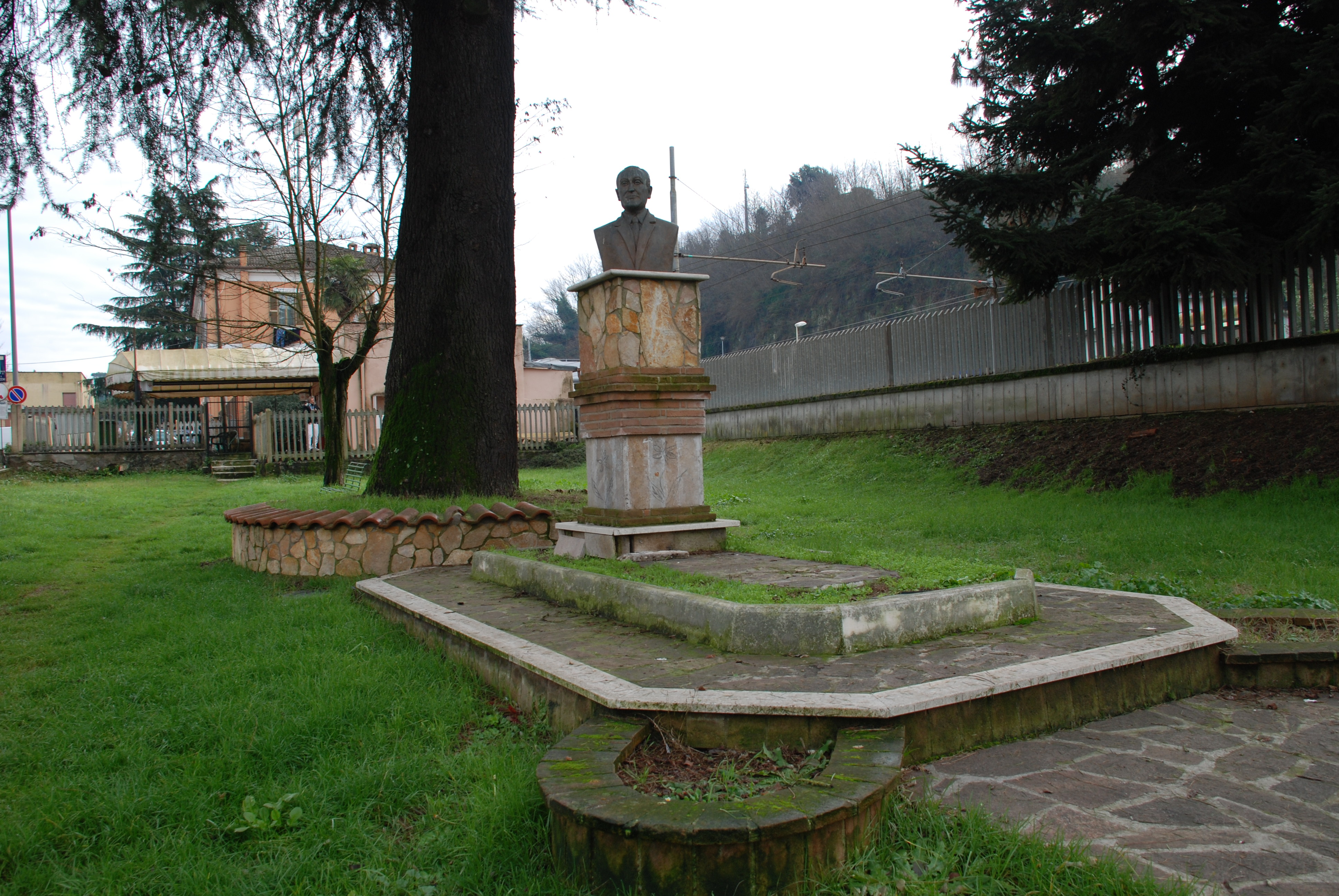
Commemorative statue dedicated to Totò

=== Commemorative statues ===
In 1999 a statue dedicated to the famous neapolitan comic actor Antonio De Curtis (professionally known as Totò) was placed in an open space in via Freud, inaugurated for the occasion by his daughter Liliana De Curtis, and the area, pedestrianized and repaved, was called Piazzetta Totò however, although it became known to the resident population of the area, it was never made official by the Municipality of Naples). The statue, smeared several times by vandals with writings and paints (on one occasion the face was even painted black), found greater protection in 2008 following the affixing of a fence to the entire flowerbed in which it is located.

Other important places are the small gardens on the first stretch of via Domenico Fontana, dedicated to the neapolitan actress Tina Pica, who died in solitude and almost forgotten in the house of one of her nephews located in nearby via Bernardo Cavallino in 1968.

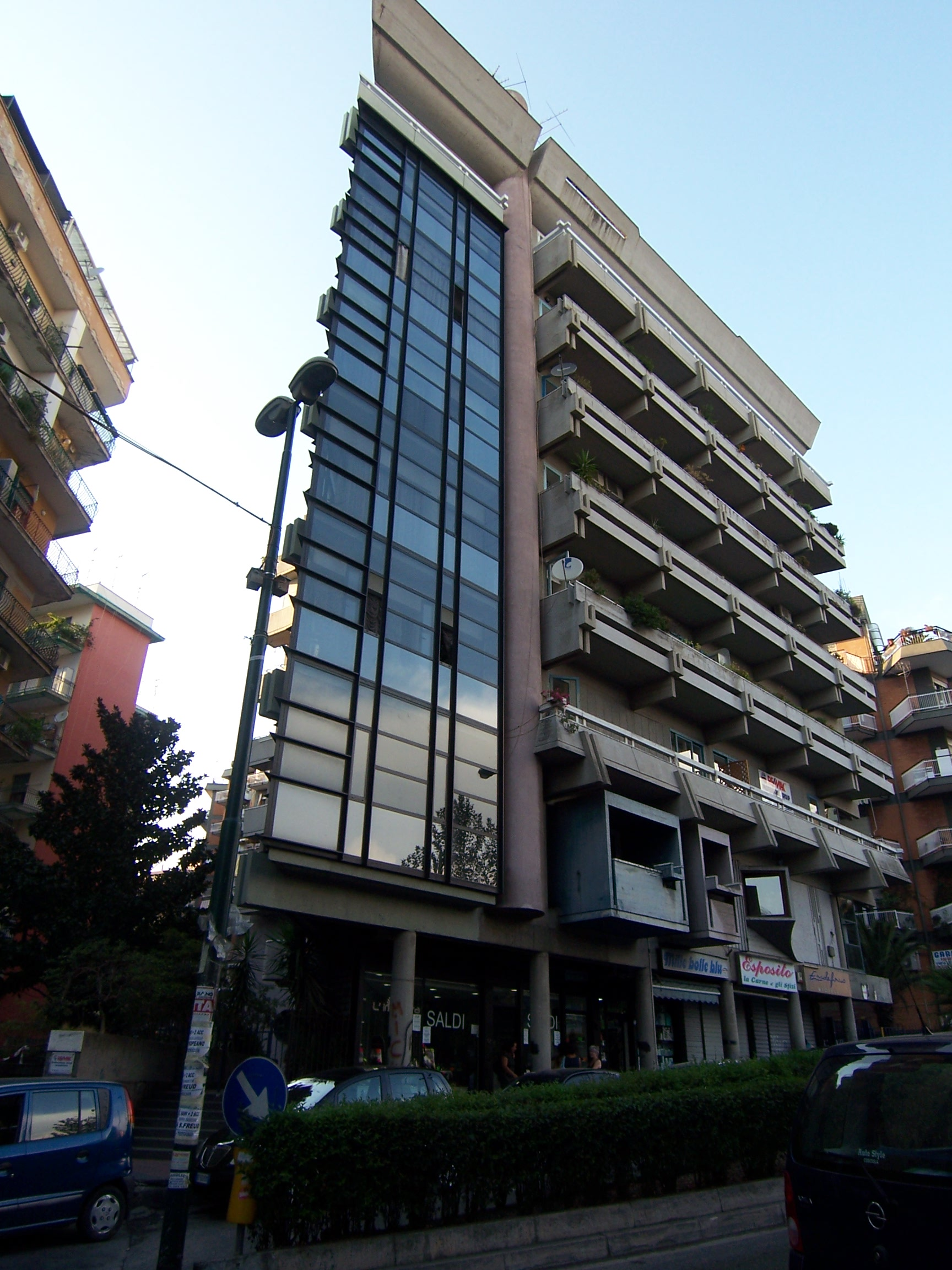
Residential building in via San Giacomo dei Capri, designed by the architect Aldo Loris Rossi

=== Villas and significant structures ===
Of architectural significance is the residential building located in via San Giacomo dei Capri and designed by Aldo Loris Rossi, with distinctive Wrightian and Lecorbusian models.

In the bridge area under Via Fontana, some of the villas of the old Via Montedonzelli still survive (Casina Russo, Villa Donzelli, Villa Paradiso). Instead, the large Villa Rota was destroyed to make way for the Il Poggio park.

Also in Via San Giacomo dei Capri, in addition to modest rural houses, there were once some villas (Villa Tammaro, the Villa of the lawyer and Minister of the King, Pasquale Grippo, Villa Clemenza and Villa Pellerano, Villa Tafuri, Villa Giordano, Villa Valentino), only some of which survived including, precisely, Villa Valentino recently restored by the lawyer Valentino. It was built in 1889 by Commendatore Giovanni Valentino as a holiday home; the arrival of the family was, in fact, announced by the affixing, by the servants, of two white porcelain greyhounds on the Tower of the Villa. During World War II the cellars were used as a shelter during the bombings.

In the upper part of the street there is still a dilapidated nineteenth-century chapel.
