= Porta del Parco railway station =

Railway station in Naples, Italy

Porta del Parco

General information
- Location: Naples, Campania; Italy
- Coordinates: 40°49′06.94″N 14°10′28.28″E
- Operator: Trenitalia
- Line: Line 2
- Platforms: 2
- Tracks: 4
- Train operators: Trenitalia

Construction
- Platform levels: 3

Other information
- Status: Under construction

History
- Opening: 2027

Services
Preceding station	Naples SFM	Following station
Bagnoli-Agnano Terme towards Pozzuoli Solfatara	Line 2	Cavalleggeri Aosta towards Napoli San Giovanni-Barra
Route map
Location

Porta del Parco (Italian: Stazione di Porta del Parco) is a railway station under construction in Naples, Italy.

It will be served by the metropolitan railway service numbered as Line 2.

== History ==
During the 2000s, several projects were proposed for the construction of new stations along Line 2, including a stop named Agnano, intended to serve the homonymous area in the Bagnoli neighborhood. The station was included in the City of Naples' 100 Stations Plan, approved in 2003, but was never built. It was later included among the projects promoted by Invitalia within the framework of the remediation of the former ILVA site, but no further developments followed on that occasion either.

A decisive boost to the project came with the award of the 2027 America's Cup to Naples, which will involve the use of the Bagnoli and Coroglio areas. Site preparation began on 22 March 2026, while construction is scheduled to start in May 2026 and will be divided into two phases. The first phase will involve the construction of the essential structures required to allow the station to open to the public by May 2027, while the second phase will consist of the station's full completion. To allow the works to be carried out, the section between Napoli Campi Flegrei and Pozzuoli Solfatara will be closed from 1 October 2026 until January 2027.

== Station building ==
The station takes its name from the nearby auditorium of the same name and will be built on Via Nuova Agnano, a short distance from Agnano railway station on the Cumana railway and from the Faculty of Engineering of the University of Naples Federico II. In particular, it will be an elevated station, located between the overpass crossing the aforementioned road and the railway overpass spanning the Cumana line. Access to the station will be provided through two walkways running along both sides of the railway embankment.

== See also ==
- History of rail transport in Italy
- List of railway stations in Naples
- List of railway stations in Campania
- Railway stations in Italy
