= Bagnoli–Agnano Terme railway station =

Railway station in Naples, Italy

Bagnoli–Agnano Terme
- The station in 2010

General information
- Location: Via Sibilla; 80124 Napoli; Naples, Campania; Italy
- Coordinates: 40°49′9.48″N 14°10′0.12″E
- Line: Line 2
- Platforms: 2
- Tracks: 2
- Train operators: Trenitalia

Construction
- Structure type: At-grade

History
- Opened: 10 March 1926; 100 years ago

Services
Preceding station	Naples SFM	Following station
Pozzuoli Solfatara Terminus	Line 2	Cavalleggeri Aosta towards Napoli San Giovanni-Barra
Route map
Location
- Location within Campania Location within Italy

The Bagnoli–Agnano Terme station is a railway stop on Line 2 of the Naples metropolitan railway service, situated on the Passante Ferroviario di Napoli. It is named after the homonymous quarter of Bagnoli, formerly famous for the Italsider industries. The station also carries the name Agnano Terme, because of its proximity to the area.

== History ==
The stop was opened on 10 March 1926.

== Station building ==
The station sits on a kind of viaduct. The passenger building is at track level but does not house any passenger services.

There are two through tracks, served by two platforms connected to each other by an underpass. The station has no freight yard.

== Passenger and train movements ==
Passenger traffic at the station is good and consists mostly of commuters. In the past the station played a fundamental role, as it was used by many workers employed in the nearby industries.

All metropolitan trains to Pozzuoli Solfatara and Napoli San Giovanni-Barra stop at the station, as well as regional trains to Villa Literno.

== See also ==
- History of rail transport in Italy
- List of railway stations in Naples
- List of railway stations in Campania
- Railway stations in Italy

== Bibliography ==
- Rete Ferroviaria Italiana, Fascicolo Linea 129.
