= Napoli Piazza Cavour railway station =

Railway station in Naples, Italy

Napoli Piazza Cavour
- The platform in 2026

General information
- Location: Naples, Campania; Italy
- Coordinates: 40°51′19.08″N 14°15′18.00″E
- Line: Line 2
- Platforms: 2
- Tracks: 2
- Train operators: Trenitalia
- Connections: Naples Metro (Line 1 at Museo); Urban and suburban buses Trolleybuses

Construction
- Structure type: Underground

History
- Opened: 20 September 1925; 101 years ago

Services
Preceding station	Naples SFM	Following station
Napoli Montesanto towards Pozzuoli Solfatara	Line 2	Napoli Piazza Garibaldi towards Napoli San Giovanni-Barra
Route map
Location
- Location within Campania Location within Italy

Napoli Piazza Cavour is a railway stop on Line 2 of the Naples metropolitan railway service, situated on the Passante Ferroviario di Napoli.

== History ==
The stop entered service on 20 September 1925, with the opening of the Passante Ferroviario di Napoli.

== Station building ==
Access to the station is through a pavilion in the middle of the green area of Piazza Cavour. Two flights of escalators on the sides and one central flight of fixed stairs lead down to the platform level. The station has no lifts because of the age of the facility. Near the stairs and escalators is the access to the corridor connecting to Museo station on Line 1 of the Naples Metro.

The station, entirely underground, has two through tracks in a single-bore tunnel and two side platforms.

== Passenger and train movements ==
Line 2 trains and metropolitan trains stop at the station, on the routes departing from Napoli Campi Flegrei and heading to Salerno, Caserta, Capua and Castellammare di Stabia.

== Interchange ==
- Metro stop (Museo, Line 1)
- Trolleybus stop
- Bus stop

== Image gallery ==
The station under construction

The passenger building on a vintage postcard

The passenger building in 2020

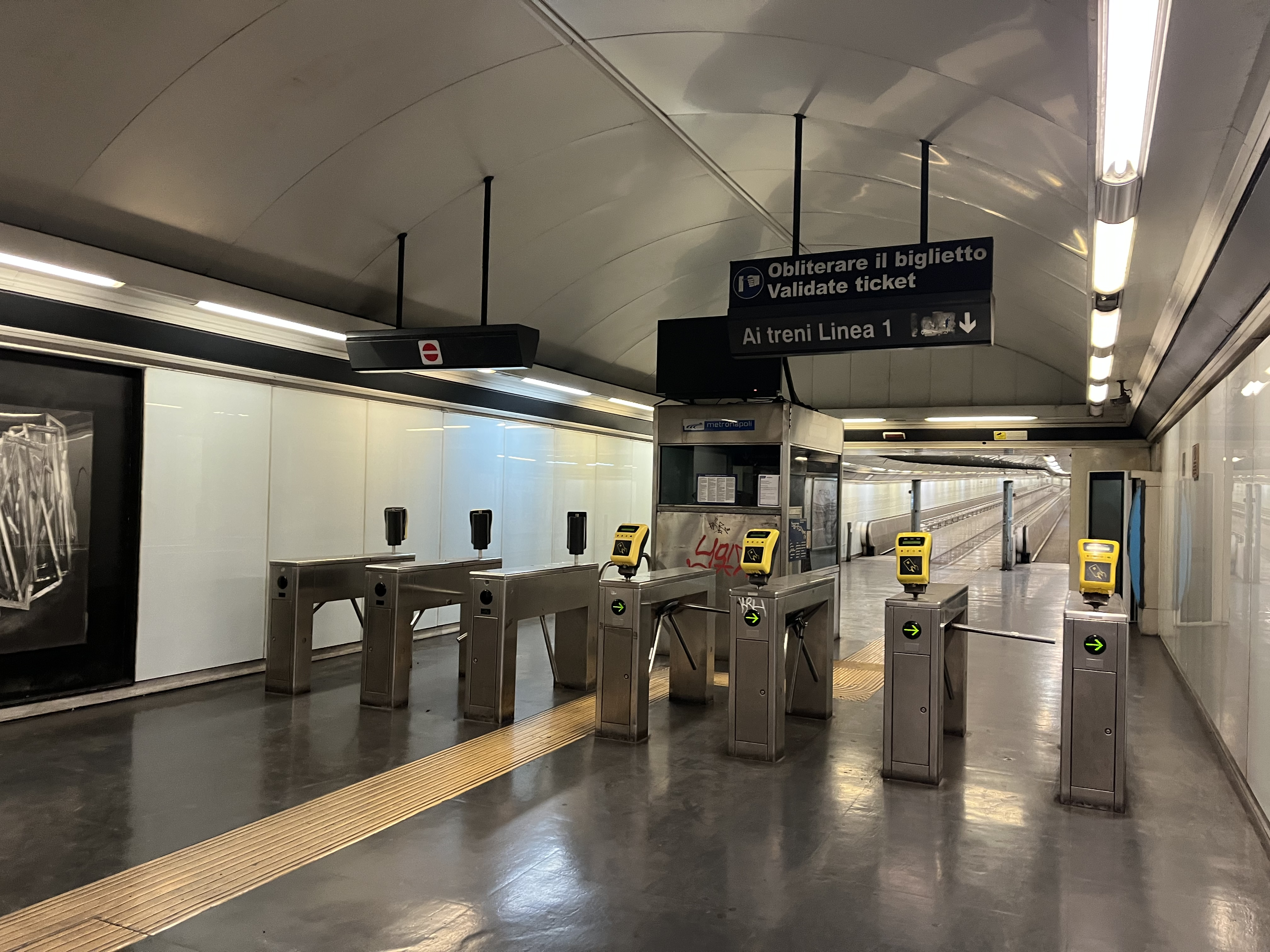
Fixed barrier in the corridor connecting to Museo station on Line 1, with ticket validators

== See also ==
- History of rail transport in Italy
- List of railway stations in Naples
- List of railway stations in Campania
- Rail transport in Italy
- Railway stations in Italy

== Bibliography ==
- Rete Ferroviaria Italiana, Fascicolo Linea 129 (Villa Literno - Napoli Gianturco).
