= Cavalleggeri Aosta railway station =

Railway station in Naples, Italy

Cavalleggeri Aosta
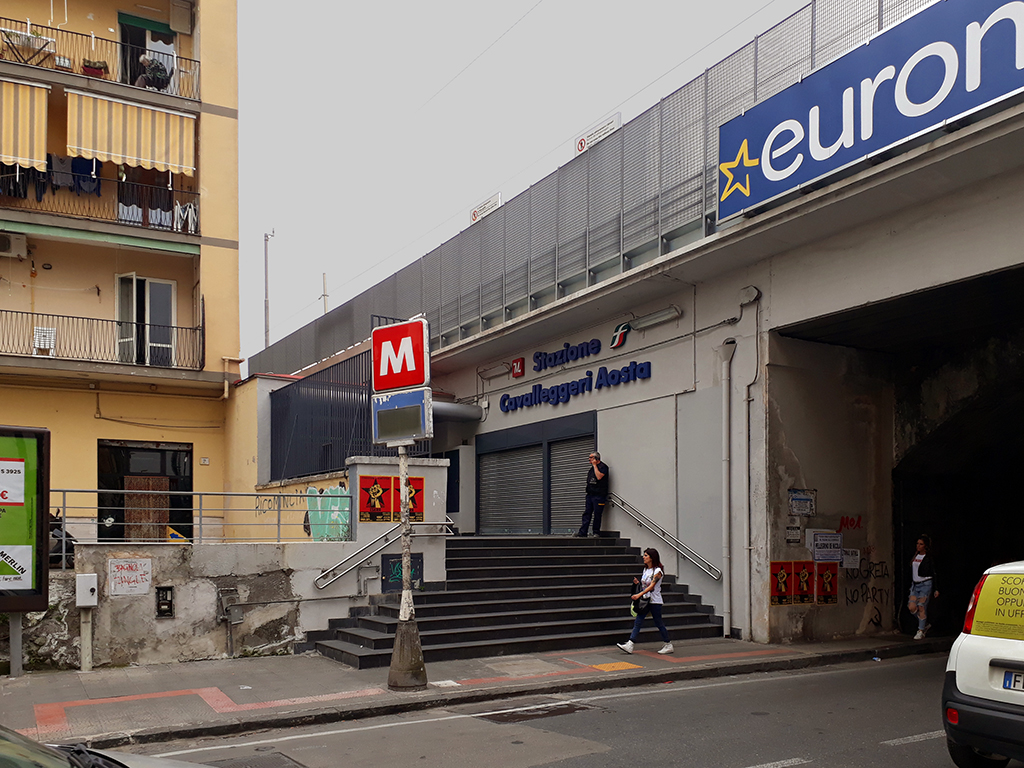
- View of the passenger corridor.

General information
- Location: Viale Cavalleggeri d'Aosta; 80124 Napoli; Naples, Campania, Italy; Italy
- Coordinates: 40°49′10.92″N 14°11′13.2″E
- Owner: Rete Ferroviaria Italiana
- Operator: Trenitalia
- Line: Line 2
- Train operators: Trenitalia
- Connections: Urban and suburban buses

History
- Opened: 14 December 1961; 64 years ago

Services
Preceding station	Naples SFM	Following station
Bagnoli–Agnano Terme towards Pozzuoli Solfatara	Line 2	Napoli Campi Flegrei towards Napoli San Giovanni-Barra
Route map
Location
- Location within Campania Location within Italy

Cavalleggeri Aosta is a railway stop on Line 2 of the Naples metropolitan railway service, situated on the Passante Ferroviario di Napoli. It was opened on 14 December 1961.

The station is currently managed by Rete Ferroviaria Italiana (RFI). Train services are operated by Trenitalia. Each of these companies is a subsidiary of Ferrovie dello Stato (FS), Italy's state-owned rail company. Cavalleggeri Aosta station is situated at Viale Cavalleggeri d'Aosta, to the south west of the city centre, in Fuorigrotta.

== History ==
The station was activated on 14 December 1961, due to the significant urban development of the Cavalleggeri d'Aosta rione, in the Fuorigrotta district of Naples. The name comes from via Cavalleggeri d'Aosta, where the entrances are located.

It was renovated in 2017.

== Station layout ==
The station does not have a passenger building, and access is through a corridor that leads directly to the platform, which is situated higher than the road level. There are two passing tracks, and the station is served by an island platform.

== See also ==
- History of rail transport in Italy
- List of railway stations in Naples
- List of railway stations in Campania
- Railway stations in Italy
