= Napoli Mergellina railway station =

Railway station in Naples, Italy

Napoli Mergellina
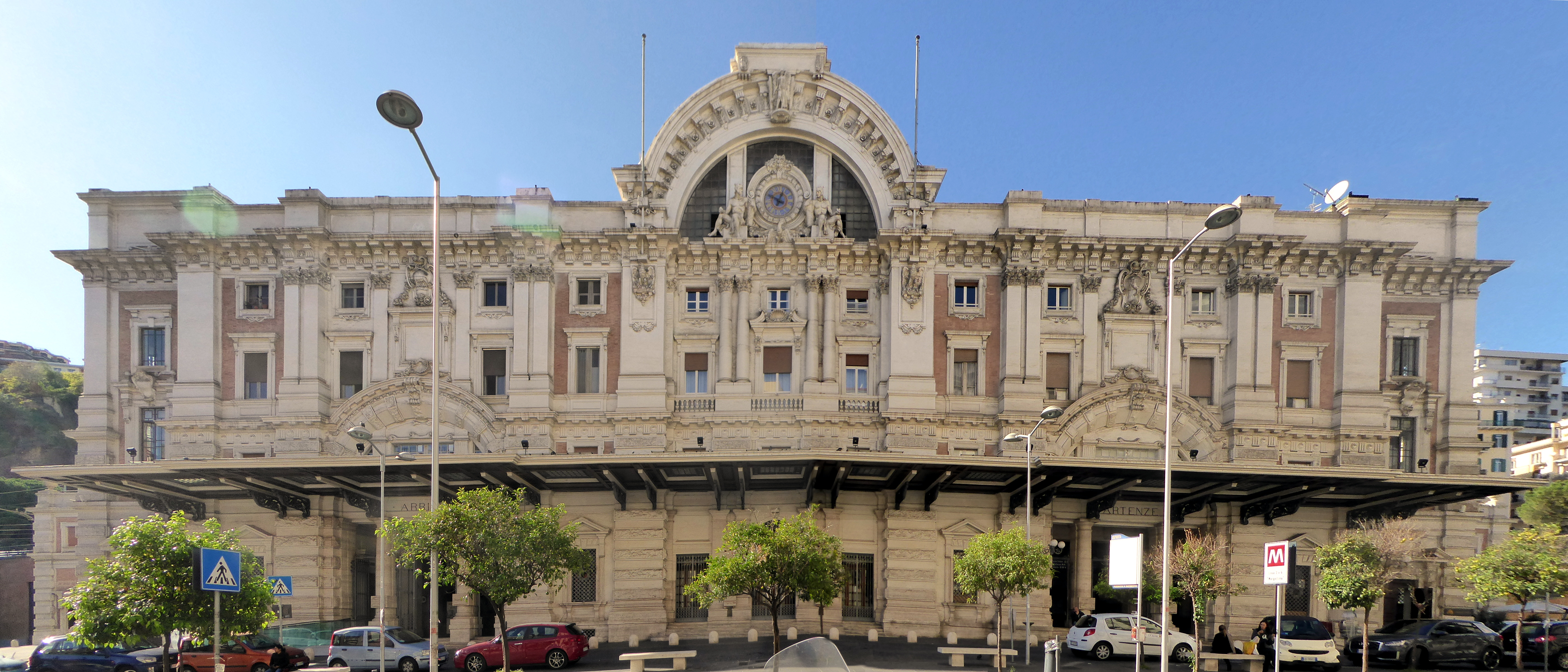
- View of the passenger building

General information
- Location: Corso Vittorio Emanuele; 80122 Naples, Campania; Italy
- Coordinates: 40°49′53″N 14°13′09″E
- Operator: Rete Ferroviaria Italiana; Centostazioni
- Lines: Line 2 Passante Ferroviario di Napoli; Urban and suburban buses
- Train operators: Trenitalia
- Connections: Naples Metro (Line 6 at Mergellina); ANM urban and intercity buses Gulf of Naples ferries

Construction
- Architect: Gaetano Costa

Other information
- Classification: Gold

History
- Opened: 20 September 1925

Services
Preceding station	Naples SFM	Following station
Napoli Piazza Leopardi towards Pozzuoli Solfatara	Line 2	Napoli Piazza Amedeo towards Napoli San Giovanni-Barra
Route map
Location

Napoli Mergellina railway station (Italian: Stazione di Napoli Mergellina) serves the city and comune of Naples, in the region of Campania, Southern Italy. Opened in 1925, it is the third most important railway station in Naples, after Napoli Centrale and Napoli Campi Flegrei. It also forms part of the Napoli–Villa Literno railway, namely Passante Ferroviario di Napoli.

The station is currently managed by Rete Ferroviaria Italiana (RFI). Train services are operated by Trenitalia. Each of these companies is a subsidiary of Ferrovie dello Stato (FS), Italy's state-owned rail company.

== Location ==
Mergellina station is on Corso Vittorio Emanuele, to the south west of the city centre. It is about 200 metres (660 ft) north of the Mergellina marina, from where the hydrofoils depart for the islands in the Gulf of Naples.

== History ==
The station was opened on 20 September 1925, upon the inauguration of the Villa Literno–Napoli Gianturco railway. Originally, the station had 5 platforms for passenger services, but since 2009 only platforms 3 and 4 are in operation. Since 2017, the station is unstaffed.

== Passenger and train movements ==
The station has about 6.2 million passenger movements each year.

== See also ==
- History of rail transport in Italy
- List of railway stations in Naples
- List of railway stations in Campania
- Rail transport in Italy
- Railway stations in Italy
