= Napoli Montesanto railway station =

Railway station in Italy

Napoli Montesanto
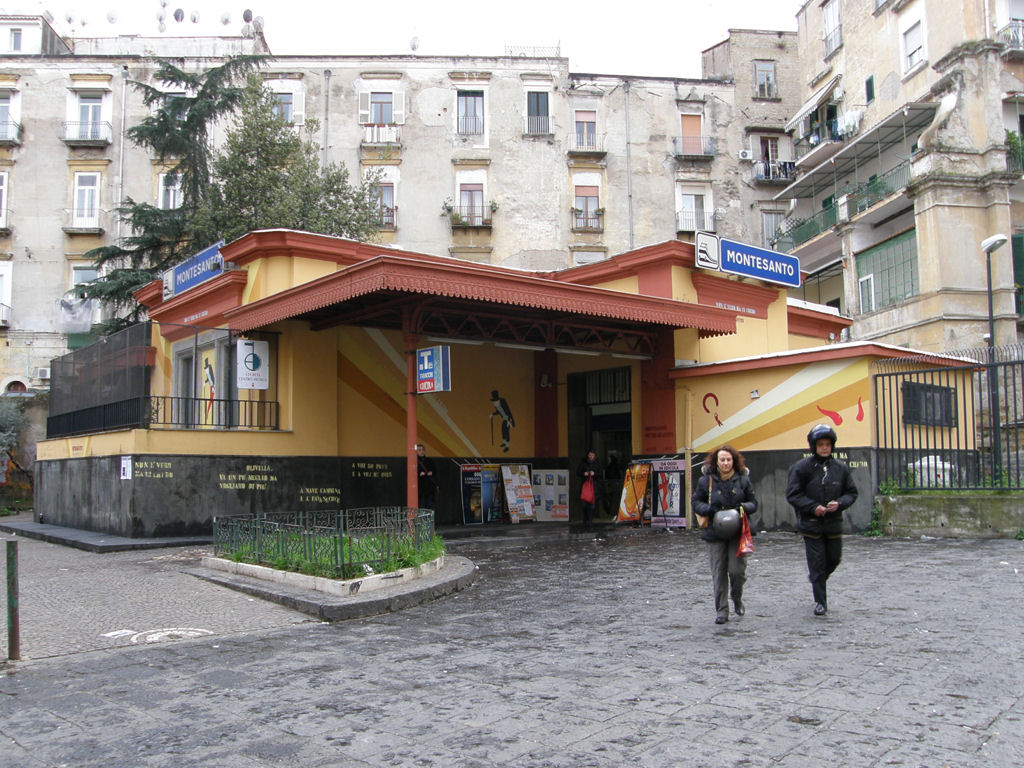
- View of the station building

General information
- Location: Montesanto; Naples, Campania; Italy
- Coordinates: 40.847606°N 14.243919°E
- Operator: Rete Ferroviaria Italiana
- Line: Line 2
- Platforms: 2
- Tracks: 2
- Train operators: Trenitalia
- Connections: Urban buses

History
- Opened: 20 September 1925; 100 years ago

Services
Preceding station	Naples SFM	Following station
Napoli Piazza Amedeo towards Pozzuoli Solfatara	Line 2	Napoli Piazza Cavour towards Napoli San Giovanni-Barra
Route map
Location
- Location within Campania Location within Italy

Napoli Montesanto is a railway station in Naples, Italy, served by Line 2 of the Naples metropolitan railway service. Trenitalia describes the station as serving the historic centre and university area, with interchange to the Cumana railway and the Montesanto Funicular.

== History ==
The station entered service on 20 September 1925, with the inauguration of Naples' Line 2. The station is regularly open to passenger service and is served by trains to and from Pozzuoli, Napoli San Giovanni–Barra, Salerno, and Caserta.

== Station building ==
Access to the station is through a pavilion located in the centre of the green area of Piazzetta Olivella, in the Montesanto area of Naples. The entrance is connected to the platforms by two escalator-equipped access shafts. A short distance away, in Piazza Montesanto, is the station of the Cumana and Circumflegrea railways (operated by EAV), as well as the Montesanto Funicular.

The station is entirely underground and consists of two running tracks housed in separate single-track tunnels, served by two side platforms.

== See also ==
- History of rail transport in Italy
- List of railway stations in Naples
- List of railway stations in Campania
- Rail transport in Italy
- Railway stations in Italy
