= Napoli Piazza Leopardi railway station =

Railway station in Naples, Italy

Napoli Piazza Leopardi
- The platforms in 2019

General information
- Location: Via Giulio Cesare; 80124 Napoli; Naples, Campania; Italy
- Coordinates: 40.824766°N 14.200369°E
- Line: Line 2
- Platforms: 1
- Tracks: 2
- Train operators: Trenitalia
- Connections: Urban and intercity buses

Construction
- Structure type: At-grade

History
- Opened: 26 September 1927; 99 years ago

Services
Preceding station	Naples SFM	Following station
Napoli Campi Flegrei towards Pozzuoli Solfatara	Line 2	Napoli Mergellina towards Napoli San Giovanni-Barra
Route map
Location
- Location within Campania Location within Italy

Napoli Piazza Leopardi is a railway stop on Line 2 of the Naples metropolitan railway service, situated on the Passante Ferroviario di Napoli.

== History ==
The stop was opened on 26 September 1927 under the name Piazza Leopardi, taken from an old square that disappeared around the mid-1930s. There stood the medieval church of San Vitale, which for some years held the remains of Giacomo Leopardi (hence the name of the square).

The station is located on Via Giulio Cesare, at its intersection with Via Attilio Regolo.

== Station building ==
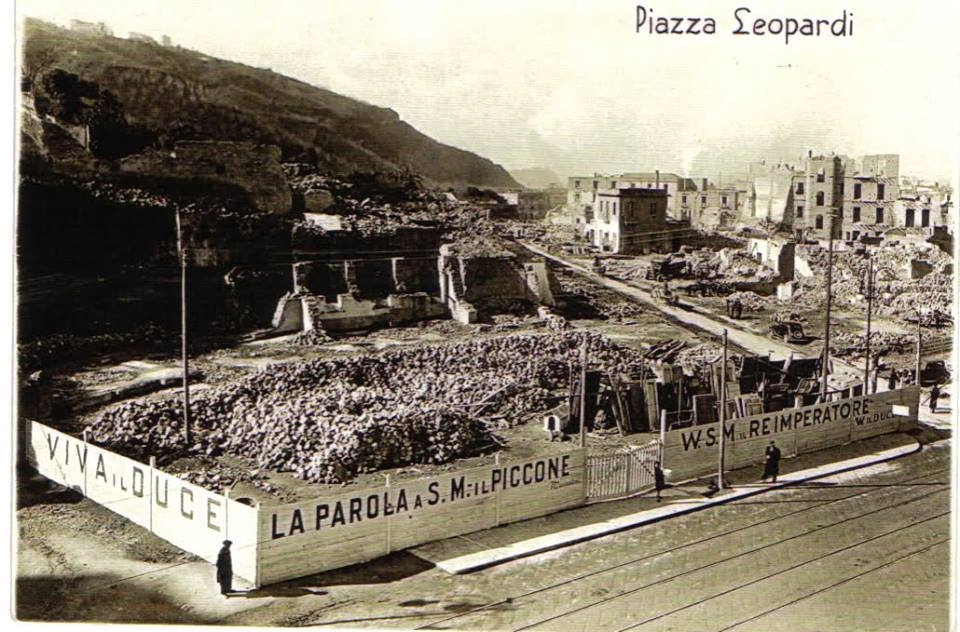
Piazza Leopardi during the redevelopment works in the Fascist era

The stop has only a small building and no proper passenger building. Next to it, a pedestrian overpass crosses the railway line, which lies below street level, and leads to the station. The station has two through tracks, served by a single island platform.

There are also other tracks, both terminating and through, but these belong to Napoli Campi Flegrei, which is located in the immediate vicinity.

== Passenger and train movements ==
The stop is served by Trenitalia trains operating as part of Line 2 of the Naples metropolitan railway service.

== Interchange ==
Between 1883 and World War II, the Pilastri stop of the Naples–Bagnoli–Pozzuoli tramway was active in front of the station, later replaced by an urban bus line.

The station has:

- Bus stop

== See also ==
- History of rail transport in Italy
- List of railway stations in Naples
- List of railway stations in Campania
- Rail transport in Italy
- Railway stations in Italy

== Bibliography ==
- Rete Ferroviaria Italiana, Fascicolo Linea 129 (Villa Literno - Napoli Gianturco).
