= Napoli Garibaldi railway station =

Railway station in Naples, Italy

Napoli Garibaldi
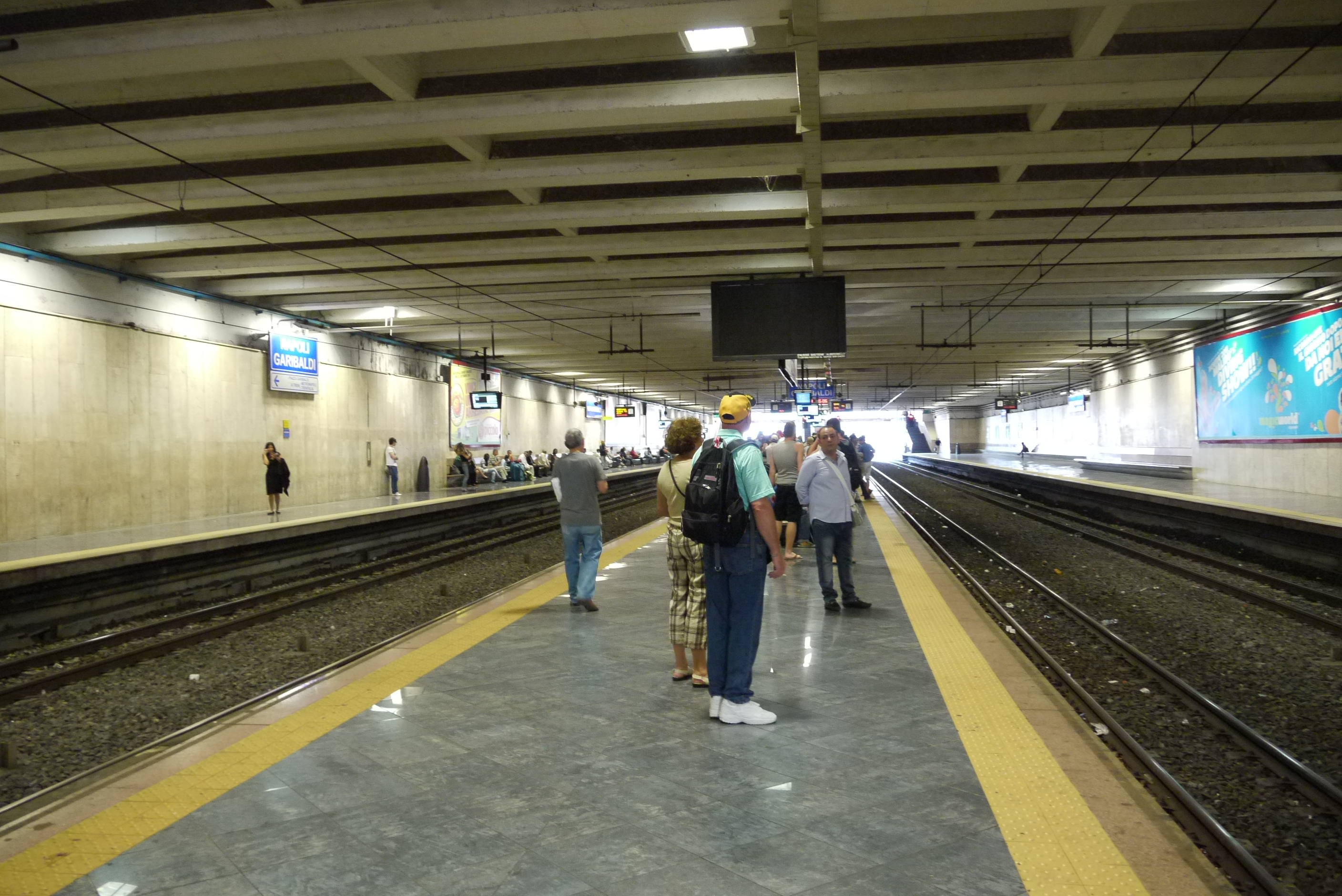

General information
- Location: Piazza Garibaldi; 80142 Napoli; Naples, Campania; Italy
- Coordinates: 40°51′03.24″N 14°16′24.24″E
- Operator: EAV
- Line: Circumvesuviana lines: Naples-Baiano line Naples-Poggiomarino line Naples-Sarno line Naples-Sorrento line San Giorgio
- Train operators: EAV
- Connections: Naples Metro (Line 1 at Garibaldi); Napoli Centrale railway station Line 2 at Napoli Piazza Garibaldi railway station Trams; Trolleybuses; ANM urban and intercity buses

History
- Opened: Between 1963 and 1973
Location
- Location within Campania Location within Italy

Napoli Garibaldi (Italian: Stazione di Napoli Garibaldi) is a railway station on Circumvesuviana railway network of the Naples metropolitan railway service. It was opened between 1963 and 1973.

The station is currently managed by Ente Autonomo Volturno (EAV).

== History ==
The station was inaugurated between 1963 and 1972. Over the years, it underwent several renovations, including the elevation of the platforms and the installation of escalators.

Starting in 2006, major renovation work began, affecting not only Piazza Garibaldi station but the entire railway hub, including Napoli Centrale and the metro station. The station was fully repaved, the escalators were replaced, and work commenced on refurbishing the pedestrian tunnel connecting the station to the Ferrovie dello Stato (FS) railway station. To temporarily mitigate the inconvenience, a new exit was opened, leading directly to Napoli Centrale via a long corridor. Another exit, which is actually the main one, is located on Via Ferraris, although it is rarely used.

The station was officially renamed Napoli Garibaldi only in 2005; previously, it was known as Napoli Collegamento Ferrovie dello Stato.

== Building ==
Napoli Garibaldi does not have a proper station building but only two kiosks, located at the two entrances, where ticket offices are situated.

The station is underground and features four tracks served by three ground-level platforms, which can be accessed via two escalators located at both ends of the station.

== Passenger and train movements ==
Napoli Garibaldi is one of the busiest stations in the entire Campania region, both due to its role as an interchange with other transport services and because all Circumvesuviana lines pass through it. Every train passing through the station makes a stop.

In the square in front of the station, in addition to numerous urban, suburban, intercity, regional, national, and international buses, urban trams and urban, suburban, and intercity trolleybuses also operate.

== Connections ==
- Railway station (Napoli Centrale)
- Line 2 railway station (Napoli Piazza Garibaldi)
- Metro stop (Garibaldi, Line 1)
- Tram stop (Lines 1 and 2)
- Trolleybus stop
- Bus stop
- Taxi stand

== See also ==
- History of rail transport in Italy
- List of railway stations in Naples
- List of railway stations in Campania
- Railway stations in Italy
