= Napoli Piazza Garibaldi railway station =

Railway station in Naples, Italy

Napoli Piazza Garibaldi
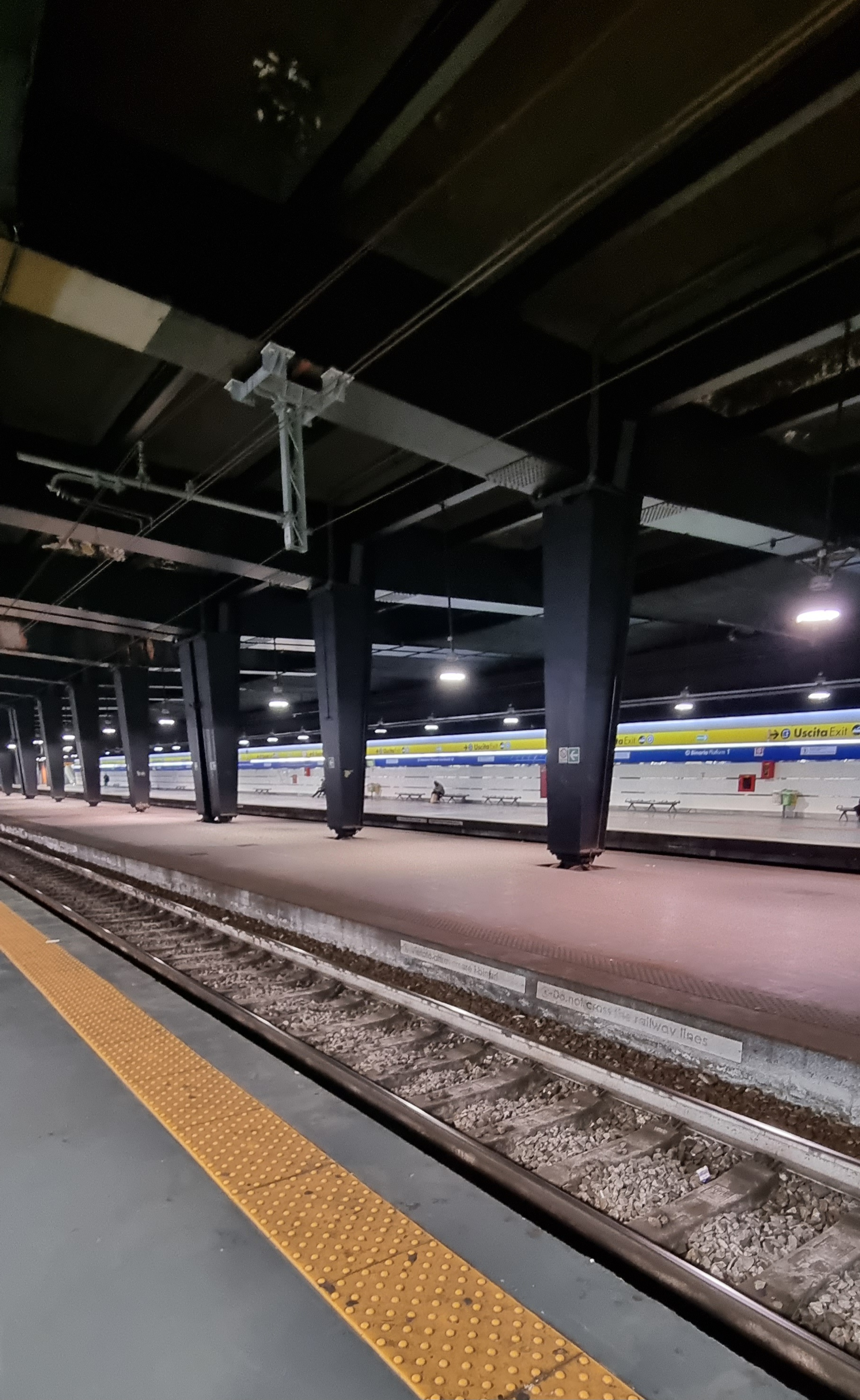
- View of the platform.

General information
- Location: Piazza Garibaldi; 80142 Napoli; Naples, Campania; Italy
- Coordinates: 40°51′08.75″N 14°16′13.55″E
- Operator: Grandi Stazioni
- Line: Line 2
- Train operators: Trenitalia
- Connections: Naples Metro (Line 1 at Garibaldi); Circumvesuviana railway Napoli Centrale railway station Circumvesuviana at Napoli Garibaldi railway station Trams; Trolleybuses; ANM urban and intercity buses

History
- Opened: 20 September 1925; 101 years ago

Services
Preceding station	Naples SFM	Following station
Napoli Piazza Cavour towards Pozzuoli Solfatara	Line 2	Napoli Gianturco towards Napoli San Giovanni-Barra
Route map
Location
- Location within Campania Location within Italy

Napoli Piazza Garibaldi (Italian: Stazione di Napoli Piazza Garibaldi) is a railway station on Line 2 of the Naples metropolitan railway service. It was opened on 20 September 1925.

The station is currently managed by Rete Ferroviaria Italiana (RFI). However, the commercial area of the passenger building is managed by Grandi Stazioni. Train services are operated by Trenitalia. Each of these companies is a subsidiary of Ferrovie dello Stato (FS), Italy's state-owned rail company.

== History ==
The station was opened on 20 September 1925, upon the inauguration of the Passante Ferroviario di Napoli.

It was an open-cut station with four tracks, located beneath the old passenger building of Napoli Centrale railway station from 1866, which was freed up due to the eastward relocation of the surface tracks.

Originally referred to as the lower yard of the Centrale station, it was officially named Napoli Piazza Garibaldi on May 12, 1927.

After World War II, following the construction of the new passenger building of Napoli Centrale station (1954–60) and the subsequent demolition of all pre-existing structures, the "trench" of Piazza Garibaldi station was covered, allowing for a significant expansion of the square above.

On March 27, 2017, it became an unstaffed stop.

== Passenger and train movements ==
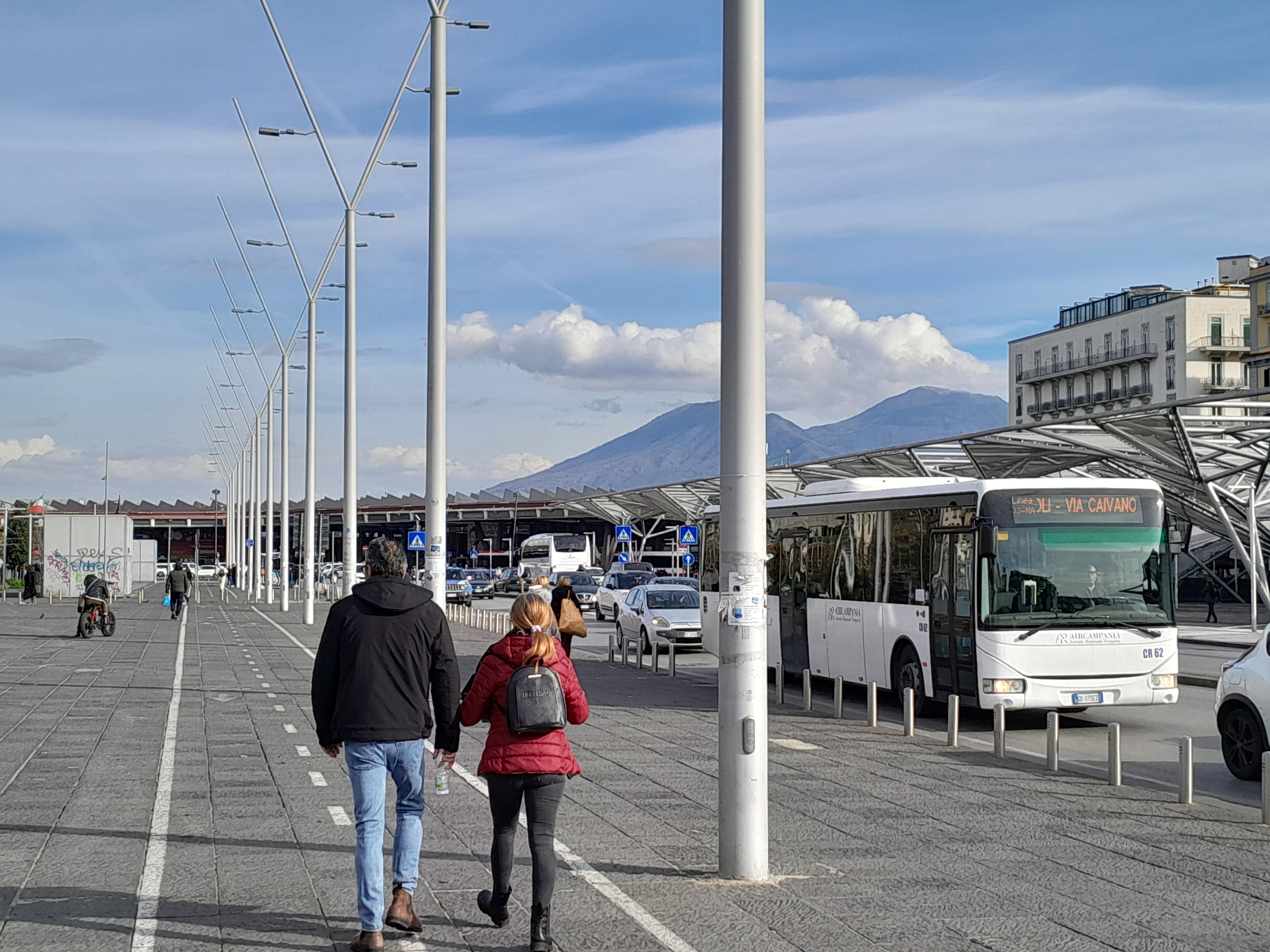
Napoli Centrale

The station is served by trains of Line 2 of the Naples metropolitan railway service.

In the past, the station was used by some long-distance trains traveling beyond Naples to avoid the technical delays required for reversing direction at the overlying Naples Centrale station, where tracks are terminal.

Originally, the station had four tracks. Starting from autumn 2015, the station yard was restructured with the removal of the former tracks 1 and 4. The central tracks, formerly numbered 2 and 3, were laterally repositioned and renumbered as "1" and "2", while the lateral platforms were simultaneously expanded. The central platform was designated for operational use only and was closed to the public, with the existing escalator being removed.

== Interchange ==
- Railway station (Napoli Centrale)
- Circumvesuviana railway station (Napoli Garibaldi)
- Metro stop (Garibaldi, Line 1)
- Tram stop (Lines 1 and 2)
- Trolleybus stop
- Bus stop
- Taxi stand

== See also ==
- History of rail transport in Italy
- List of railway stations in Campania
- List of railway stations in Naples
- Railway stations in Italy
