= Napoli Piazza Amedeo station =

Railway station in Italy

Napoli Piazza Amedeo
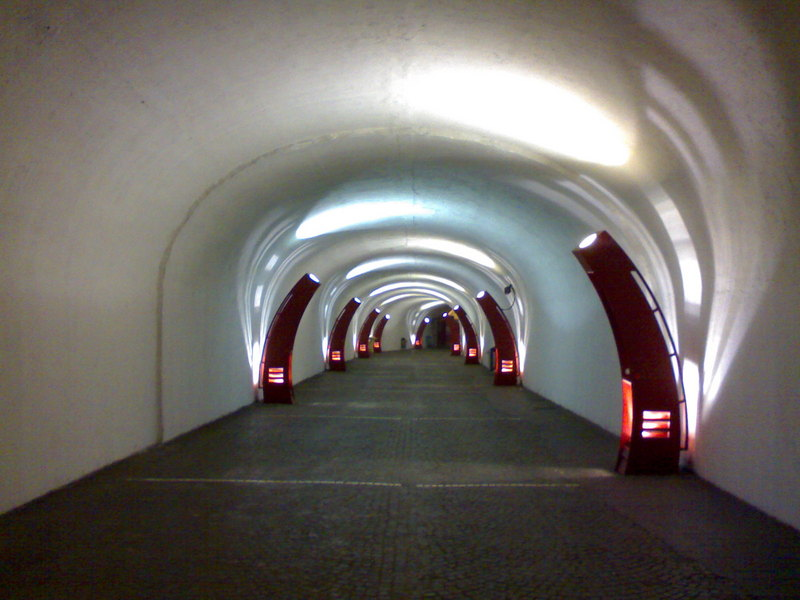
- View of the passenger entrance

General information
- Location: Piazza Amedeo; Naples, Campania; Italy
- Coordinates: 40.8375°N 14.2336°E
- Operator: Rete Ferroviaria Italiana; Centostazioni
- Line: Line 2
- Train operators: Trenitalia
- Connections: Urban buses

Other information
- Classification: Silver

History
- Opened: 20 September 1925; 100 years ago

Services
Preceding station	Naples SFM	Following station
Napoli Mergellina towards Pozzuoli Solfatara	Line 2	Napoli Montesanto towards Napoli San Giovanni-Barra
Route map
Location
- Location within Campania Location within Italy

Napoli Piazza Amedeo is an underground railway station that serves Line 2 on the Naples metropolitan railway service. It went into service September 20, 1925, with the activation of the metropolitan service from Naples to Pozzuoli Solfatara (the so-called "Metropolitana FS"). It is overlooked by Vomero Hill and the entrance to the station found in Piazza Amedeo with a long tunnel leading to the platforms.

The station has a pavilion made of reinforced concrete which leads through a long tunnel leading to the turnstiles and the docks. The station is located in the Rione Amedeo, in the heart of Naples' wealthy, near nightlife. It is also close to Via dei Mille, Via Calabritto and Piazza dei Martiri, which are lined with designer boutiques. The station is also well connected by Chiaia Funicular to Vomero.

== See also ==
- History of rail transport in Italy
- List of railway stations in Naples
- List of railway stations in Campania
- Rail transport in Italy
- Railway stations in Italy
