= Campegna station =

Naples Metro station

Coordinates: 40°49′16.85″N 14°11′45.7″E

Campegna

General information
- Location: Via Campegna, Naples
- System: Naples Metro station
- Operator: ANM
- Line: Line 6
- Connections: Napoli Campi Flegrei (Line 2); Urban and suburban buses

Services
Preceding station	Naples Metro	Following station
Mergellina towards Municipio	Line 6	Terminus
Route map
Location

Campegna will be a Naples Metro underground station that will serve Line 6.

According to the forecasts, work for the construction of the Campegna station and the adjacent depot is expected to be completed by 2030.

== History ==
A preliminary design for the station dates back to 2009, during the development of the Bagnoli Futura project, when an extension of Line 6 to Bagnoli was planned. This extension included intermediate stops at Campegna, Acciaieria, Città della Scienza, and Porta del Parco. However, the appointment of a commissioner and the subsequent failure of Bagnoli Futura in 2014 led to a revision of the project by Invitalia, which took over as the implementing body for the cleanup of the former ILVA area. The revised plan included extending the line to Nisida, with intermediate stops at Campegna, Neghelli, and Acciaieria. According to the established plans, the station will be located near the former RFI railway areas of the Napoli Campi Flegrei station, which will be converted into the future depot for Line 6. It will also serve as a branching point for the future Posillipo station.

== See also ==
- List of Naples metro stations
