= FS Class E.420 =

FS class E.420
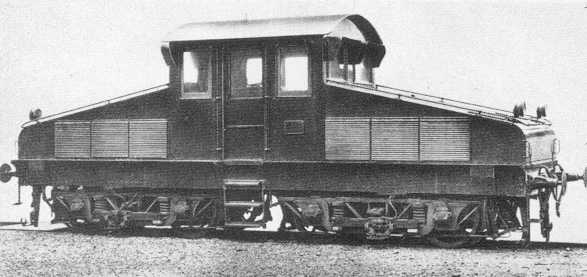
Type and origin
- Power type: Electric
- Builder: General Electric
- Build date: 1901
- Total produced: 1
Specifications
- Configuration
  - UIC: Bo′Bo′
- Gauge: 1,435 mm (4 ft 8 1/2 in) standard gauge
- Wheel diameter: 1,067 mm (42.01 in)
- Length: 10.18 m (33 ft 4 3/4 in)
- Loco weight: 34.1 t (33.6 long tons; 37.6 short tons)
- Electric system/s: 650 V DC third rail (till 1937); 1200 V DC overhead line (from 1937)
- Traction motors: 4
Performance figures
- Maximum speed: 60 km/h (37 mph)
- Power output: 440 kW (590 hp) continuous
Career
- Operators: RM and FS
- Nicknames: salt box

FS class E.420 locomotive was a third rail electric locomotive built for the operation of the Milan - Gallarate - Varese railway in Italy.

== History ==
The locomotive was ordered for the operation of the Milan - Gallarate - Varese railway line, electrified in 1901 by the Rete Mediterranea (RM). It was registered by the RM as RM.01 and was used for both passenger and freight traffic. In addition, twenty railcars were ordered.

In 1905 the locomotive was taken over by the Ferrovie dello Stato (FS). In the late 1920s, the locomotive was transferred from the Varese line to the Naples subway, to be used for freight traffic from Naples Campi Flegrei station. With the electrification at 3000 V DC of the Neapolitan line in 1937, it was transferred to the Cumana railway, which had been electrified in 1927. Here, it was converted to the 1200 V DC overhead line system and fitted with a pantograph. It remained in service until 1963.

== Technical details ==
The locomotive was built by General Electric and was similar to machines already in operation in the United States and Europe. In particular, it was similar to the E1-E8 series supplied to the French Compagnie du chemin de fer de Paris à Orléans and exhibited at the Exposition Universelle (1900) in Paris. The four traction motors totalled 440 kW (590 hp), identical to that of the railcars delivered at the same time. At the maximum speed of 60 km/h (37 mph), the locomotive could haul a train of eight four-wheel coaches. In appearance, the E.420 resembled the locomotives delivered to the Paris-Orléans railway, known as "salt boxes".
