= List of railway stations in Naples =

The city of Naples currently has 43 railway stations in passenger service, of which 14 are managed by Rete Ferroviaria Italiana (RFI) (part of Ferrovie dello Stato Italiane) and 29 by Ente Autonomo Volturno (EAV), the regional public transport operator of Campania. The city's main railway hub is Napoli Centrale railway station.

Most RFI stations are located along the Naples railway bypass (Passante ferroviario), while the EAV network comprises eight urban and suburban lines, including the two Phlegraean lines (the Cumana and Circumflegrea) and the five lines of the Circumvesuviana network.

Both the railway bypass and the EAV lines provide metropolitan-style rail services. Many stations offer interchange opportunities, either direct or indirect, between the two systems or with the Naples Metro, which is operated by ANM.

Several additional stations are currently under construction or in the planning stage, including Napoli Galileo Ferraris railway station on the RFI railway bypass and the stations of EAV's Line 7.

== Stations ==
=== RFI ===
Stations include:

- Bagnoli–Agnano Terme railway station
- Cavalleggeri Aosta railway station
- Napoli Campi Flegrei railway station
- Napoli Centrale railway station
- Napoli Gianturco railway station
- Napoli Mergellina railway station
- Napoli Piazza Amedeo railway station
- Napoli Piazza Cavour railway station
- Napoli Piazza Garibaldi railway station
- Napoli Piazza Leopardi railway station
- Napoli San Giovanni–Barra railway station
- Pietrarsa–San Giorgio a Cremano railway station
- Porta del Parco railway station
- Traccia railway station

=== EAV ===
Stations include:

- Agnano railway station
- Argine Palasport railway station
- Bagnoli–Città della Scienza railway station
- Barra railway station
- Bartolo Longo railway station
- Botteghelle railway station
- Napoli Centro Direzionale railway station
- Corso Vittorio Emanuele railway station
- Dazio railway station
- Edenlandia railway station
- Fuorigrotta railway station
- Napoli Garibaldi railway station
- La Trencia railway station
- Madonnelle railway station
- Monte Sant'Angelo railway station
- Montesanto railway station
- Mostra–Stadio Maradona railway station
- Pianura railway station
- Piave railway station
- Pisani railway station
- Poggioreale railway station
- Ponticelli railway station
- Napoli Porta Nolana railway station
- San Giovanni a Teduccio railway station
- Santa Maria del Pozzo railway station
- Soccavo railway station
- Traiano railway station
- Vesuvio de Meis railway station
- Via Gianturco railway station

== See also ==
- Circumflegrea railway
- Cumana railway
- Naples–Foggia railway
- Rome–Formia–Naples railway
- Napoli Piazza Garibaldi railway station
- Naples Passante railway line
- Napoli-Centro Direzionale-San Giorgio railway
- Rome–Naples high-speed railway
- Rome–Formia–Naples railway
- Naples–Salerno high-speed railway
- Naples–Salerno railway
- Naples Metro
