= Rome–Formia–Naples railway =

Railway line in Italy

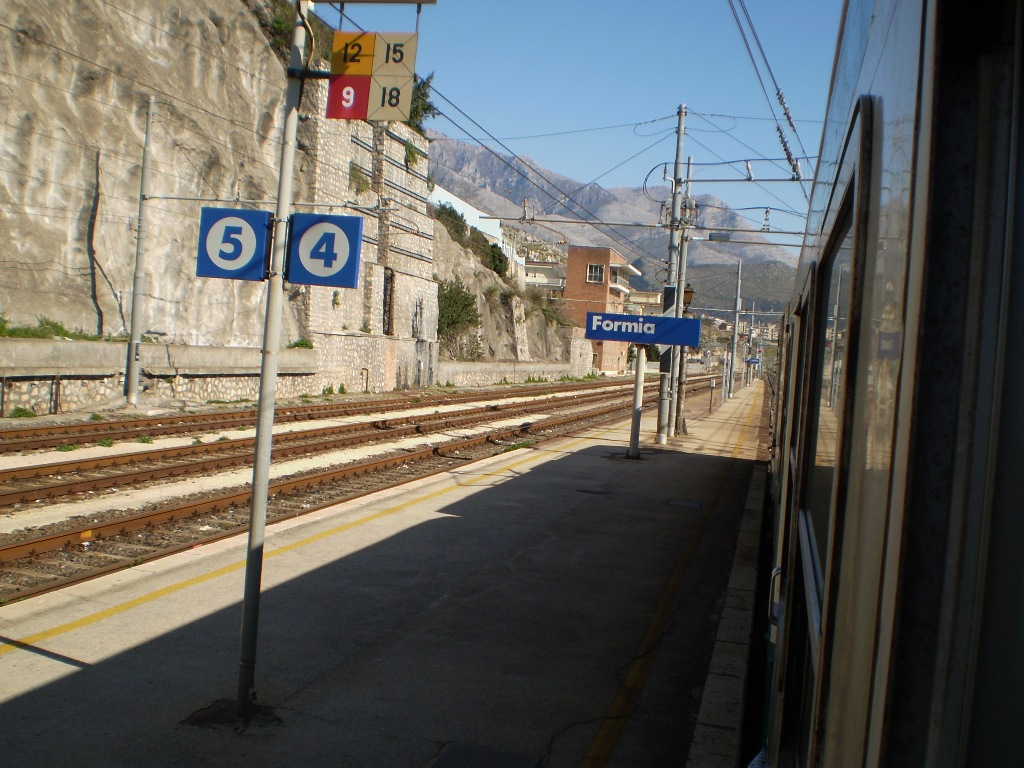
- Rome–Formia–Naples railway

Overview
- Status: in use
- Owner: RFI
- Locale: Italy
- Termini: Rome; Naples

Service
- Type: Heavy rail
- Operator: Trenitalia

Technical
- Line length: 214 km (133 mi)
- Track gauge: 1,435 mm (4 ft 8 1/2 in) standard gauge
- Electrification: 3 kV DC

The Rome–Formia–Naples railway—also called the Rome–Naples Direttissima in Italian ("most direct")–is part of the traditional main north-south trunk line of the Italian railway network. It was opened in 1927 as a fast link as an alternative to the existing Rome–Naples via Cassino line, significantly reducing journey times. High-speed trains on the route use the parallel Rome–Naples high-speed railway, which was partially opened in December 2005, and fully in December 2009.

== History ==
Problems with the Rome–Naples line via Cassino led to proposals for the construction of a new line nearer the coast as early as 1871. When the Papal States planned the Cassino line, it was not designed just as a direct connection with Naples, but also was intended to connect with smaller localities on the way. Partly as a result, it had a tortuous route which, especially in the valley of the Sacco River, was subject to frequent disruption by floods and landslides. The old line was built to the avoid the coastal route through the Pontine Marshes, which was still swampy and malarial. As a result, its route is hilly and in parts mountainous, creating problems for the under-powered steam locomotives of the period.

The construction of a coastal line was authorised by legislation on 29 July 1879 on condition that it was coordinated with the Terracina–Priverno and the Gaeta–Formia–Sparanise lines. The commitment was confirmed by legislation on 5 July 1882 and during the reorganisation of the Italian railways in 1885. The project was always controversial: it is supported by railway engineers such as Alfredo Cottrau but opposed by politicians such as Francesco Saverio Nitti.

The final design of the line was drafted in 1902 and approved in 1905 when responsibility for the project was assumed by Ferrovie dello Stato (the State Railways). Construction began in 1907 but was not finished until 1927 because it was necessary to dig several long tunnels, including the Monte Orso and the Vivola tunnels, both of which are about 7.5 km long.

The line was electrified at 3000 V DC in 1935. Following this, electric trains could run over the entire north-south route from Bologna to Naples.

Since 2009, when the Rome-Naples high-speed railway was opened, trains from Rome Termini have no longer operated over the Villa Literno–Napoli Gianturco railway (Naples Passante), but instead run from Villa Literno via Aversa to Napoli Centrale.

== Branches ==
- From Aversa, towards Rome by the line via Cassino line via Caserta.
- From San Marcellino–Frignano towards Naples by the Cassino line via Caserta.
- From Villa Literno towards Naples by the Villa Literno–Napoli Gianturco railway via Pozzuoli, Napoli Campi Flegrei, Napoli Gianturco to Salerno (partly used by Line 2 of the Naples metro).
- From Formia to Gaeta, now closed. It is scheduled to reopen in 2010.
- From Priverno-Fossanova to Terracina.
- From Campoleone to Nettuno.

== See also ==
- List of railway lines in Italy
