= Naples–San Giorgio a Cremano railway =

Commuter rail line in Naples

Line 7

Overview
- Locale: Naples, Italy
- Transit type: Commuter rail
- Number of lines: 1
- Number of stations: 11

Operation
- Began operation: 2004
- Operator: EAV

Technical
- System length: 12 km
- Track gauge: 1,435 mm (4 ft 8 1/2 in) standard gauge
System map
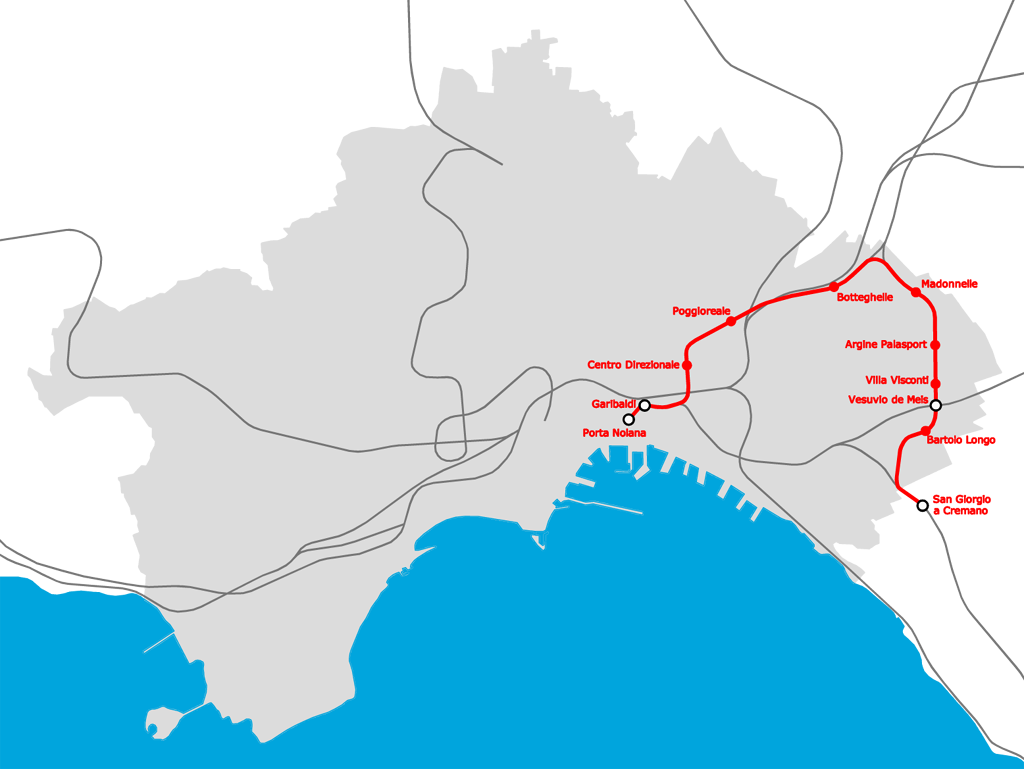

The Naples–Centro Direzionale–San Giorgio a Cremano railway is a commuter rail service part of Circumvesuviana network operated by the Ente Autonomo Volturno (EAV) company in the city of Naples, Italy. It connects 11 stations.

== Route ==
Station	Interchanges	Opening
Porta Nolana		1891
Piazza Garibaldi	Central railway station, Naples Metro Line 1, Line 2, various Circumvesuviana lines	
Centro Direzionale		2000
Poggioreale		2002
Botteghelle	Naples–Baiano railway	2002
Madonnelle		2001
Argine Palasport		2001
Villa Visconti		2001
Vesuvio de Meis	Naples–Sarno railway	2001
Bartolo Longo		2001
San Giorgio a Cremano	Naples–Sorrento railway, Naples–Poggiomarino railway	1904

== See also ==
- List of suburban and commuter rail systems
