= Napoli Gianturco railway station =

Railway station in Naples, Italy

Napoli Gianturco
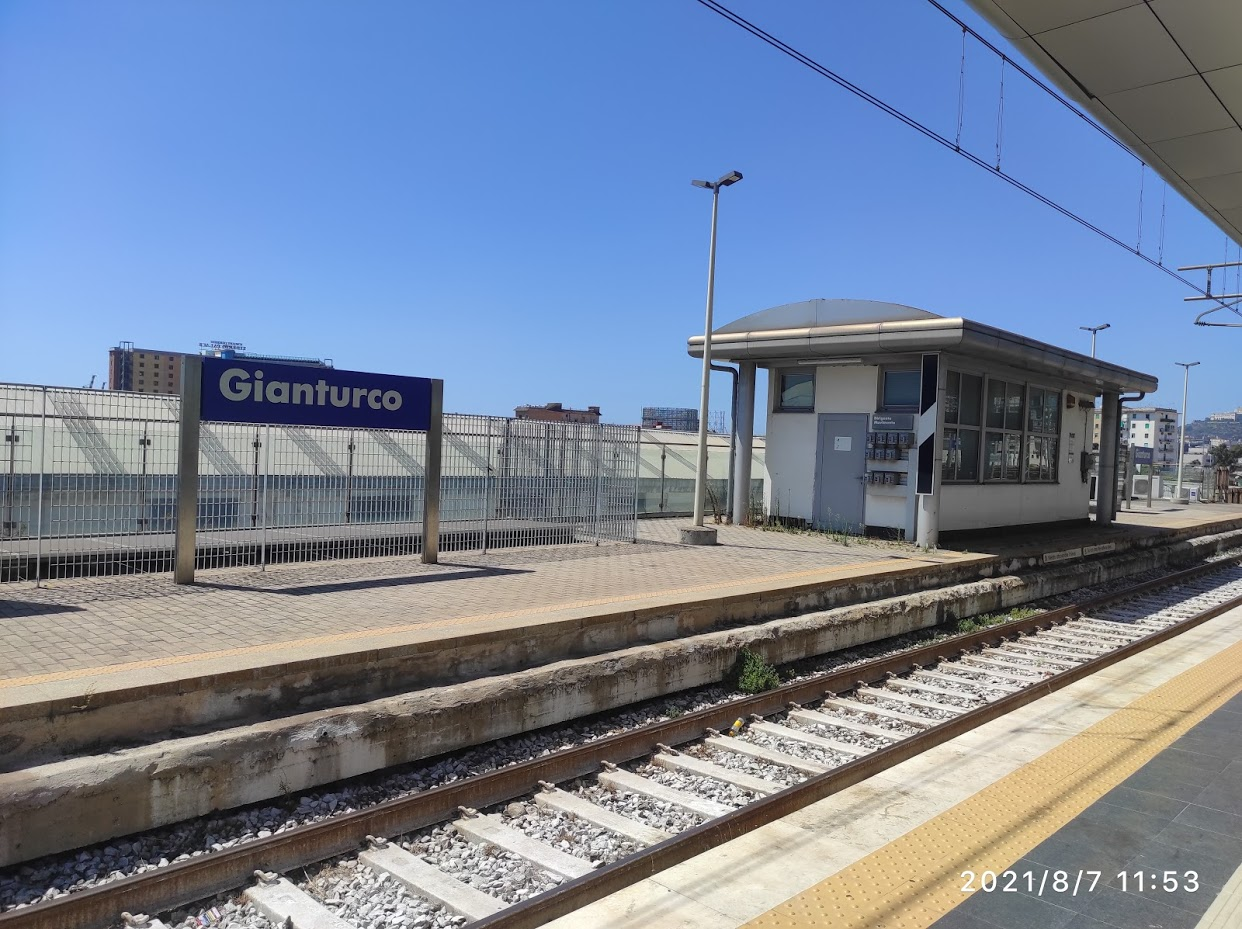
- View of the platform

General information
- Location: Naples, Campania; Italy
- Coordinates: 40°51′13.32″N 14°17′16.08″E
- Operator: Trenitalia
- Line: Line 2
- Platforms: 2
- Tracks: 4
- Train operators: Trenitalia

Construction
- Platform levels: 3

Other information
- Status: active

History
- Opened: 12 May 1927
- Rebuilt: 2007

Services
| Preceding station | Naples SFM | Following station |
|---|---|---|
| Napoli Piazza Garibaldi towards Pozzuoli Solfatara | Line 2 | Napoli San Giovanni-Barra Terminus |
Route map
Location

Napoli Gianturco (Italian: Stazione di Napoli Gianturco) is a railway station in Naples, Italy.

It is served by the metropolitan railway service numbered as Line 2. It takes its name from Via Gianturco, in the city's industrial area.

From here, the trains passing through the railway link (now only underground line 2) could reach the lines for Cassino and Salerno. The few metropolitan trains in daily regional service (three every day) for Caserta use the line for Cassino, while those for Salerno use the line for Salerno.

The station was activated on May 12, 1927, as a simple stop, and was originally called "Via Gianturco." An earlier proposal would have named the station "Pasconcello."

The station has two platforms and four tracks.

== See also ==
- History of rail transport in Italy
- List of railway stations in Naples
- List of railway stations in Campania
- Railway stations in Italy
