= Napoli Centrale railway station =

Railway station in Naples, Italy

Napoli Centrale
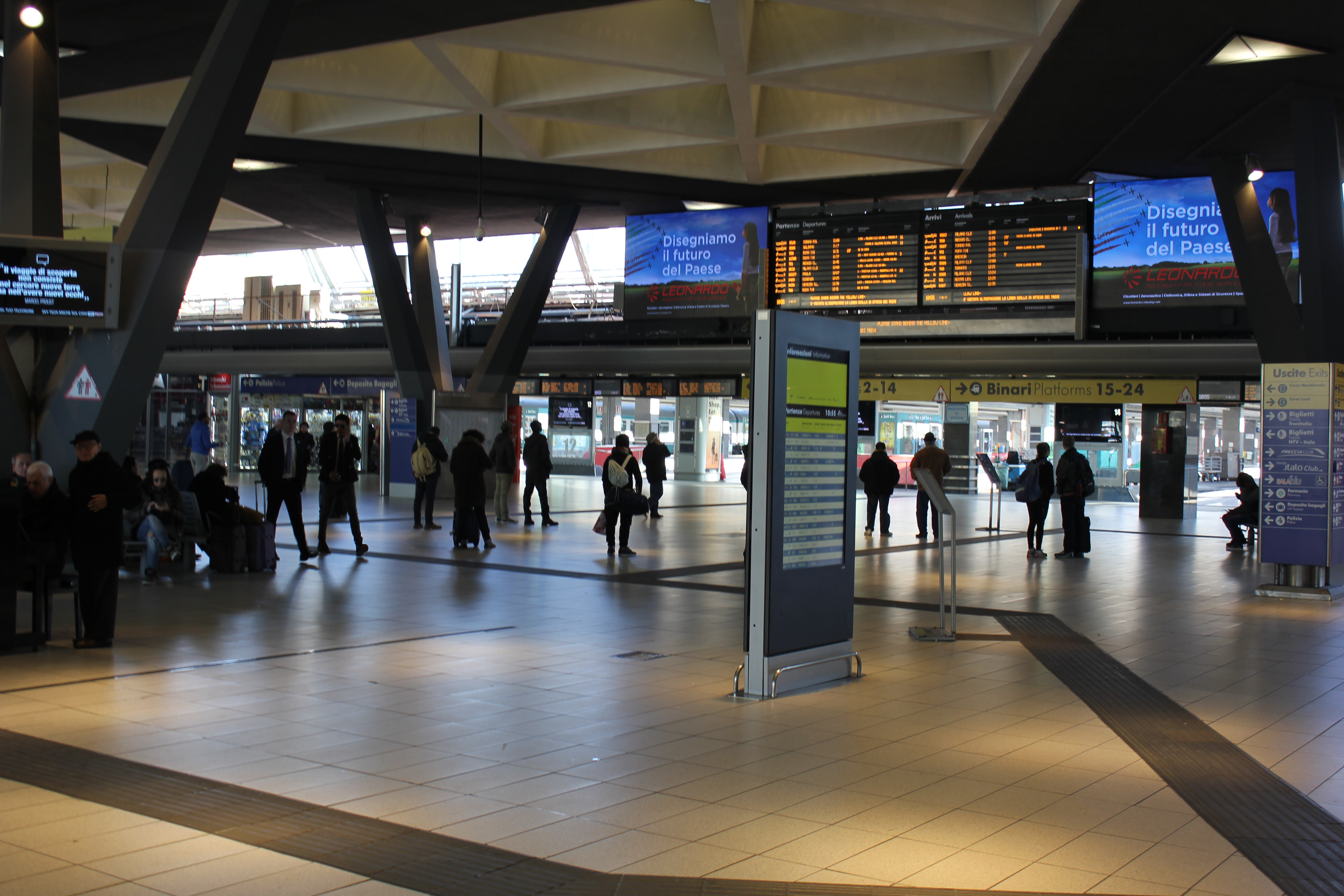
- Main hall following the restoration

General information
- Location: Piazza Garibaldi; 80142 Naples; Italy
- Coordinates: 40°51′09″N 14°16′19″E
- Owner: Rete Ferroviaria Italiana
- Operator: Grandi Stazioni
- Lines: Rome–Naples (high-speed); Rome–Formia–Naples; Rome–Cassino–Naples; Naples–Salerno (high-speed); Naples–Salerno (traditional)
- Distance: 215.971 km (134.198 mi) from Roma Termini
- Platforms: 24
- Connections: Naples Metro (Line 1); Naples Metro (Line 2); Circumvesuviana railway ANM buses and airport shuttles

Construction
- Architect: Pier Luigi Nervi

Other information
- IATA code: INP
- Classification: Platinum

History
- Opened: 7 May 1867
- Rebuilt: 1960

Passengers
- 50 million per year
Location
- Location within Campania Location within Italy

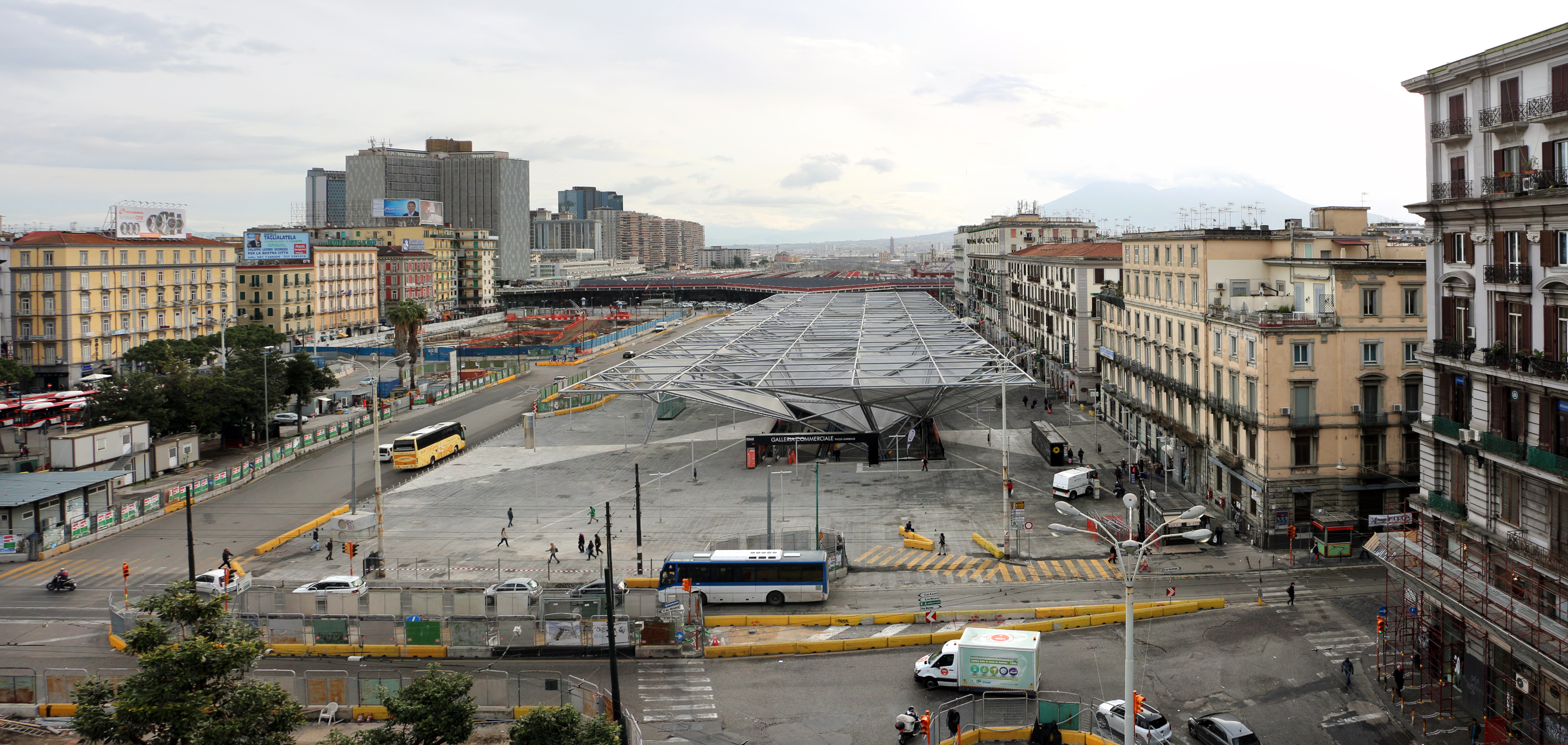
Piazza Garibaldi in 2016, with the railway station in the background.

Napoli Centrale (lit. 'Naples Central Station'; Italian: Stazione di Napoli Centrale) (IATA: INP) is the main railway station in the city of Naples and in southern Italy and the sixth largest station in Italy in terms of passenger flow with an annual ridership of 50 million. It is located next to Piazza Garibaldi to the east of the old city. It is the primary rail terminus and station for Naples, and serves Trenitalia national railways and EAV. This one has an underground section known as Stazione di Napoli Piazza Garibaldi (Naples Garibaldi Piazza station), which is served by the metropolitan trains of the line 2, line 1 (Garibaldi), and 3, 12, 14, and 15 EAV Circumvesuviana lines which is accessible from 2 entrances inside the Centrale station, 1 outside in glass, and from the new Garibaldi Square.

== History ==
The first station on the site was built in 1866 on a design by the architect Enrico Alvino and it was opened on 7 May of the following year. The current station was designed in 1954 by Pier Luigi Nervi, Carlo Cocchia, Massimo Battaglini, Bruno Zevi, Giulio De Luca, Luigi Piccinato and Giuseppe Vaccaro on the site of the old railway station and overlooks the square dedicated to Giuseppe Garibaldi. The project was completed in 1960. The station has undergone a deep restyling lasting five years and finished in August 2010, which concerned both the platform and the underground floor, with the installation of new escalators, elevators, lights, benches, shops and the replacement of the original floors made in black linoleum with a more modern white tile covering.

== Transport ==
The station has 23 tracks (from 2 to 24). It is connected to Rome by high-speed trains on the Rome–Naples high-speed railway line as well as slower trains on the original Rome–Cassino–Naples line and the Rome–Formia–Naples Direttissima opened in 1927. It is connected to Salerno and southern Italy by the traditional Naples–Salerno line and the recently opened Naples–Salerno high-speed line used by long-distance trains.

== Train services ==
The station is served by the following services (incomplete):

- High speed services (Frecciarossa) Turin - Milan - Reggio Emilia - Bologna - Florence - Rome - Naples - Salerno
  - 2 trains a day extend north to Brescia and 2 trains extend south to Taranto
- High speed services (Frecciarossa) Venice - Padua - Bologna - Florence - Rome - Naples - Salerno
- High speed services (Frecciargento) Rome - Naples - Salerno - Paola - Lamezia Terme - Rosarno - Reggio di Calabria
- High speed services (Frecciargento) Bolzano - Trento - Rovereto - Verona - Bologna - Florence - Rome - Naples
- High speed services (Frecciabianca) Rome - Naples - Salerno - Sapri - Lamezia - Vibo Valentia - Reggio Calabria
- High speed services (Italo) Turin - Milan - Reggio Emilia - Bologna - Florence - Rome - Naples - Salerno
- High speed services (Italo) Brescia - Desenzano - Peschiera del Garda - Verona - Bologna - Florence - Rome - Naples
- Intercity services Rome - Naples - Salerno - Lamezia Terme - Messina - Palermo
- Intercity services Rome - Naples - Salerno - Lamezia Terme - Messina - Siracusa
- Intercity services Rome - Naples - Salerno - Lamezia Terme - Reggio di Calabria
- Intercity services Rome - Naples - Salerno - Taranto
- Intercity services Turin - Genoa - La Spezia - Pisa - Livorno - Rome - Naples - Salerno
- Intercity services Livorno - Civitavecchia - Rome - Naples
- Night train (Intercity Notte) Rome - Naples - Messina - Siracusa
- Night train (Intercity Notte) Turin - Genoa - La Spezia - Pisa - Livorno - Rome - Naples - Salerno
- Regional services (Treno Regionale) Rome - Pomezia - Latina - Formia - Minturno - Naples

== Napoli Piazza Garibaldi and Napoli Garibaldi stations ==
Below the mainline station there are undergrounds stations named Napoli Piazza Garibaldi station, for the Passante Ferroviario di Napoli, used by the suburban train of the line 2, and Garibaldi station, used by the Line 1 of the Naples Metro. There is also a connection to the nearby Circumvesuviana Napoli Garibaldi.

== See also ==
- History of rail transport in Italy
- List of railway stations in Campania
- List of railway stations in Naples
- Railway stations in Italy
