= List of railway stations in Campania =

This is the list of the railway stations in Campania owned by Rete Ferroviaria Italiana, a branch of the Italian state company Ferrovie dello Stato.

== List ==
| Station | Locality | Province | Category |
|---|---|---|---|
| Acerra | Acerra | Naples | Silver |
| Acquamela | Acquamela | Salerno | Bronze |
| Agropoli-Castellabate | Agropoli | Salerno | Silver |
| Albanova | Casal di Principe | Caserta | Bronze |
| Altavilla Irpina | Altavilla Irpina | Avellino | Bronze |
| Amorosi-Melizzano | Amorosi | Benevento | Bronze |
| Angri | Angri | Salerno | Silver |
| Apice-Sant'Arcangelo-Bonito | Apice | Benevento | Bronze |
| Apice Corsano | Apice | Benevento | Bronze |
| Ariano Irpino | Ariano Irpino | Avellino | Bronze |
| Arpaia-Airola-Stant'Agata | Arpaia | Benevento | Bronze |
| Ascea | Ascea | Salerno | Silver |
| Avellino | Avellino | Avellino | Silver |
| Aversa | Aversa | Caserta | Gold |
| Bagnoli Irpino | Bagnoli Irpino | Avellino | Bronze |
| Bagnoli-Agnano Terme | Naples | Naples | Silver |
| Baronissi | Baronissi | Salerno | Silver |
| Battipaglia | Battipaglia | Salerno | Silver |
| Benevento Acquafredda | Benevento | Benevento | Bronze |
| Benevento Appia | Benevento | Benevento | Gold |
| Benevento Centrale | Benevento | Benevento | Gold |
| Benevento Cese | Benevento | Benevento | Bronze |
| Benevento Pontecorvo | Benevento | Benevento | Bronze |
| Benevento Rione Libertà | Benevento | Benevento | Silver |
| Benevento Arco Traiano | Benevento | Benevento | Bronze |
| Benevento Porta Rufina | Benevento | Benevento | Bronze |
| Buccino-San Gregorio Magno | Buccino | Salerno | Bronze |
| Calitri-Pescopagano | Calitri | Avellino | Bronze |
| Campagna-Serre-Persano | Campagna | Salerno | Bronze |
| Campo di Nusco | Campo di Nusco | Avellino | Bronze |
| Cancello | Cancello | Caserta | Silver |
| Cancello Arnone | Cancello e Arnone | Caserta | Bronze |
| Capaccio-Roccadaspide | Capaccio | Salerno | Silver |
| Capua | Capua | Caserta | Silver |
| Casalnuovo | Casalnuovo di Napoli | Naples | Silver |
| Caserta | Caserta | Caserta | Gold |
| Casoria-Afragola | Casoria | Naples | Silver |
| Cassano Irpino | Cassano Irpino | Avellino | Bronze |
| Castel San Giorgio-Roccapiemonte | Castel San Giorgio | Salerno | Bronze |
| Castelfranci | Montemarano | Avellino | Bronze |
| Castellammare di Stabia | Castellammare di Stabia | Naples | Silver |
| Cava dei Tirreni | Cava de' Tirreni | Salerno | Silver |
| Celle Bulgheria-Roccagloriosa | Celle di Bulgheria | Salerno | Bronze |
| Centola | Centola | Salerno | Bronze |
| Cervinara | Cervinara | Avellino | Bronze |
| Cese | Cese | Benevento | Bronze |
| Chianche-Ceppaloni | Chianche | Benevento | Bronze |
| Codola | Codola | Salerno | Bronze |
| Contursi Terme | Contursi Terme | Salerno | Bronze |
| Conza-Andretta-Cairano | Conza della Campania | Avellino | Bronze |
| Eboli | Eboli | Salerno | Silver |
| Falciano-Mondragone-Carinola | Falciano del Massico | Caserta | Silver |
| Fisciano | Fisciano | Salerno | Silver |
| Fragneto Monforte | Fragneto Monforte | Benevento | Bronze |
| Frasso Telesino-Dugenta | Dugenta | Benevento | Bronze |
| Frattamaggiore-Grumo | Frattamaggiore | Naples | Silver |
| Fratte | Salerno | Salerno | Bronze |
| Fratte Villa Comunale | Salerno | Salerno | Bronze |
| Giugliano-Qualiano | Giugliano in Campania | Naples | Bronze |
| Gragnano | Gragnano | Naples | Bronze |
| Gricignano-Teverola | Gricignano di Aversa | Caserta | Bronze |
| Lanzara-Fimiani | Lanzara | Salerno | Bronze |
| Lavorate | Lavorate | Salerno | Bronze |
| Lioni | Lioni | Avellino | Bronze |
| Luogosano-San Mango sul Calore | Luogosano | Avellino | Bronze |
| Maddaloni Inferiore | Maddaloni | Caserta | Silver |
| Madonna delle Grazie | Gragnano | Naples | Bronze |
| Marcianise | Marcianise | Caserta | Silver |
| Mercato San Severino | Mercato San Severino | Salerno | Silver |
| Mignano Monte Lungo | Mignano Monte Lungo | Caserta | Silver |
| Montaguto-Panni | Montaguto | Avellino | Bronze |
| Montecalvo-Buonalbergo-Casalbore | Montecalvo Irpino | Avellino | Bronze |
| Montecorvino Rovella | Bellizzi | Salerno | Bronze |
| Montella | Montella | Avellino | Bronze |
| Montemarano | Montemarano | Avellino | Bronze |
| Montoro-Forino | Montoro Inferiore | Avellino | Bronze |
| Montorsi | Montorsi | Benevento | Bronze |
| Morcone | Morcone | Benevento | Bronze |
| Morra De Sanctis-Teora | Morra De Sanctis | Avellino | Bronze |
| Napoli Afragola | Naples | Naples | Platinum |
| Napoli Campi Flegrei | Naples | Naples | Gold |
| Napoli Cavalleggeri Aosta | Naples | Naples | Silver |
| Napoli Centrale, Napoli Piazza Garibaldi and Napoli Garibaldi | Naples | Naples | Platinum |
| Napoli Galileo Ferraris | Naples | Naples | Bronze |
| Napoli Gianturco | Naples | Naples | Silver |
| Napoli Mergellina | Naples | Naples | Gold |
| Napoli Montesanto | Naples | Naples | Silver |
| Napoli Piazza Amedeo | Naples | Naples | Silver |
| Napoli Piazza Cavour | Naples | Naples | Silver |
| Napoli Piazza Leopardi | Naples | Naples | Silver |
| Napoli Porta Nolana | Naples | Naples | Silver |
| Napoli Ponticelli | Naples | Naples | Bronze |
| Napoli San Giovanni Barra | Naples | Naples | Silver |
| Nocera Inferiore | Nocera Inferiore | Salerno | Silver |
| Nocera Inferiore Mercato | Nocera Inferiore | Salerno | Bronze |
| Nocera Superiore | Nocera Superiore | Salerno | Silver |
| Nola | Nola | Naples | Silver |
| Nusco | Nusco | Avellino | Bronze |
| Omignano-Salento | Omignano | Salerno | Bronze |
| Paduli | Paduli | Benevento | Bronze |
| Paestum | Paestum | Salerno | Silver |
| Pagani | Pagani | Salerno | Bronze |
| Palma-San Gennaro | Palma Campania | Naples | Bronze |
| Pellezzano | Pellezzano | Salerno | Bronze |
| Pescosannita-Fragneto L'Abate | Pesco Sannita | Benevento | Bronze |
| Pietrarsa-San Giorgio a Cremano | Naples and San Giorgio a Cremano | Naples | Bronze |
| Pietrelcina | Pietrelcina | Benevento | Bronze |
| Pignataro Maggiore | Pignataro Maggiore | Caserta | Bronze |
| Pisciotta-Palinuro | Pisciotta | Salerno | Silver |
| Policastro Bussentino | Policastro Bussentino | Salerno | Bronze |
| Pompei | Pompei | Naples | Silver |
| Ponte-Casalduni | Ponte | Benevento | Bronze |
| Pontecagnano | Pontecagnano | Salerno | Silver |
| Pontelandolfo | Pontelandolfo | Benevento | Bronze |
| Portici-Ercolano | Portici | Naples | Silver |
| Pozzuoli Cantieri | Pozzuoli | Naples | Silver |
| Pozzuoli Cappuccini | Pozzuoli | Naples | Bronze |
| Pozzuoli Gerolomini | Pozzuoli | Naples | Bronze |
| Pozzuoli Solfatara | Pozzuoli | Naples | Silver |
| Prata-Pratola | Prata di Principato Ultra | Avellino | Bronze |
| Quarto di Marano | Quarto | Naples | Bronze |
| Recale | Recale | Caserta | Silver |
| Riardo-Pietramelara | Riardo | Caserta | Bronze |
| Romagnano-Vietri-Salvitelle | Romagnano al Monte | Salerno | Bronze |
| Rovigliano | Torre Annunziata | Naples | Bronze |
| Salerno Arbostella | Salerno | Salerno | Bronze |
| Salerno Arechi | Salerno | Salerno | Silver |
| Salerno Centrale | Salerno | Salerno | Gold |
| Salerno Duomo-Via Vernieri | Salerno | Salerno | Silver |
| Salerno Fratte | Salerno | Salerno | Silver |
| Salerno Irno | Salerno | Salerno | Silver |
| Salerno Mercatello | Salerno | Salerno | Bronze |
| Salerno Pastena | Salerno | Salerno | Bronze |
| Salerno Torrione | Salerno | Salerno | Bronze |
| San Felice a Cancello | San Felice a Cancello | Caserta | Silver |
| San Lorenzo Maggiore | San Lorenzo Maggiore | Benevento | Bronze |
| San Marcellino-Frignano | San Marcellino | Caserta | Bronze |
| San Martino-Montesarchio-Pannarano | Montesarchio | Benevento | Silver |
| San Michele di Serino | San Michele di Serino | Avellino | Bronze |
| Sant'Antimo-Sant'Arpino | Sant'Antimo | Naples | Silver |
| Santa Croce del Sannio | Santa Croce del Sannio | Benevento | Bronze |
| Santa Maria Capua Vetere | Santa Maria Capua Vetere | Caserta | Silver |
| Santa Maria La Bruna | Santa Maria La Bruna | Naples | Bronze |
| Sapri | Sapri | Salerno | Silver |
| Sarno | Sarno | Salerno | Silver |
| Savignano-Greci | Savignano Irpino | Avellino | Bronze |
| Scafati | Scafati | Salerno | Silver |
| Serino | Serino | Avellino | Bronze |
| Sessa Aurunca-Roccamonfina | Sessa Aurunca | Caserta | Silver |
| Sicignano degli Alburni | Sicignano degli Alburni | Salerno | Bronze |
| Solofra | Solofra | Avellino | Bronze |
| Solopaca | Solopaca | Benevento | Bronze |
| Sparanise | Sparanise | Caserta | Silver |
| Teano | Teano | Caserta | Bronze |
| Telese-Cerreto | Telese Terme | Benevento | Silver |
| Tora-Presenzano | Tora | Caserta | Bronze |
| Torre Annunziata Centrale | Torre Annunziata | Naples | Silver |
| Torre Annunziata Città | Torre Annunziata | Naples | Bronze |
| Torre del Greco | Torre del Greco | Naples | Silver |
| Torre Orsaia | Torre Orsaia | Salerno | Bronze |
| Tufo | Tufo | Avellino | Bronze |
| Vairano-Caianello | Vairano Patenora | Caserta | Silver |
| Valle di Maddaloni | Valle di Maddaloni | Caserta | Bronze |
| Valle di Mercato San Severino | Sant'Angelo in Macerata | Salerno | Bronze |
| Vallo della Lucania-Castelnuovo | Vallo della Lucania | Salerno | Silver |
| Vietri sul Mare-Amalfi | Vietri sul Mare | Salerno | Silver |
| Villa Literno | Villa Literno | Caserta | Silver |

== Other stations ==
Not owned by RFI

- Napoli Porta Nolana railway station (owned by EAV)

== See also ==
- Railway stations in Italy
- Ferrovie dello Stato
- Rail transport in Italy
- High-speed rail in Italy
- Transport in Italy
