= Passante Ferroviario di Napoli =

Railway line in Naples, Italy

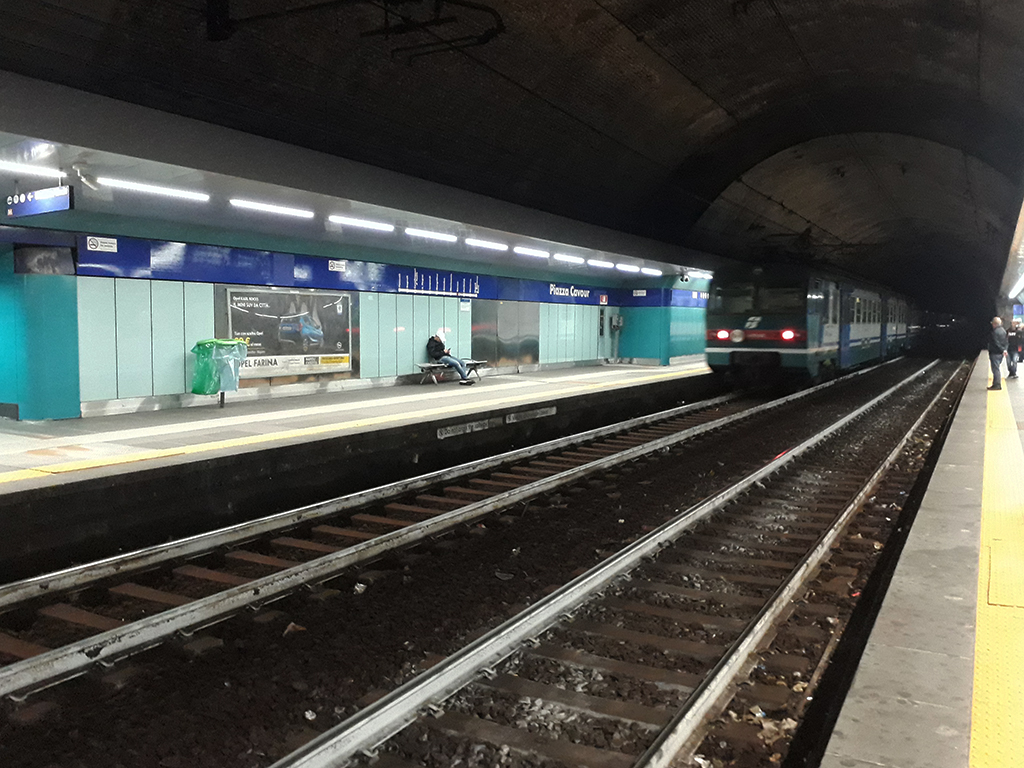
- Train at Napoli Piazza Cavour.

Overview
- Native name: Passante ferroviario di Napoli
- Status: operational
- Owner: RFI
- Locale: Naples, Italy
- Termini: Villa Literno; Naples

Service
- Type: Heavy rail
- System: Naples metropolitan railway service
- Services: L2, Trenitalia regional trains
- Operator: Trenitalia

Technical
- Track gauge: 1,435 mm (4 ft 8 1/2 in) standard gauge
- Electrification: 3 kV DC
Route map

The Passante Ferroviario di Napoli (also called Villa Literno–Napoli Gianturco railway) is a 16 km-long double track transit line which connects the line to Rome via Formia with the line to Salerno near Napoli Gianturco station through Naples and its north-western suburbs. This line is used by the suburban trains named as line 2.

"Passante" is the Italian word for "passing" and is used to describe a railway built through a major city, connecting suburban lines. This is modelled on S-Bahn underground junctions built in West Germany in the 1970s.

== History ==
With the construction of Rome–Naples Direttissima, it was decided to build a through railway ("Passante"), partly on the surface and partly underground, directly connecting the line from Salerno with the line to Rome, without the need to reverse trains. The line would also allow the construction of several railway stations in order to create an urban metropolitan service.

Although work started in 1906, it was not opened until 20 September 1925 due to delays in completing the work, mainly as a result of World War I and the hilliness of the route. The railway consists of three stations outside the city of Naples in Pozzuoli, Giugliano (its station, Giugliano-Qualiano is some distance from the centres of both Giugliano and Qualiano) and Quarto and six in the city at Napoli Garibaldi, Cavour, Montesanto, Amedeo, Chiaia and Fuorigrotta. The entire line was double track and electrified with 650 V DC third rail.

In 1927, the names of the stations of Chiaia and Fuorigrotta were changed to respectively in Mergellina and Campi Flegrei. In the same year, the Direttissima was completed connecting to the metropolitana near Villa Literno station and the stations of Bagnoli and Gianturco were opened. In 1929, the station of Piazza Leopardi was opened.

In 1935, the line was electrified with standard Italian Railways 3 kV DC Overhead Lines, a new station was opened at Cavalleggeri d'Aosta and the station at Piazza Garibaldi (beneath Napoli Centrale) was rebuilt.

Today the metropolitan trains of the line 2 operates between Gianturco to Pozzuoli on the line. Some of them go further to Castellammare di Stabia, Salerno and Caserta. Until 2009, the stations of Piazza Garibaldi, Mergellina and Campi Flegrei were also served by long-distance trains, but this severely interfered with the suburban services.

== See also ==
- List of railway lines in Italy
- Passante Ferroviario di Milano
