= Napoli Campi Flegrei railway station =

Railway station in Naples, Italy

Napoli Campi Flegrei
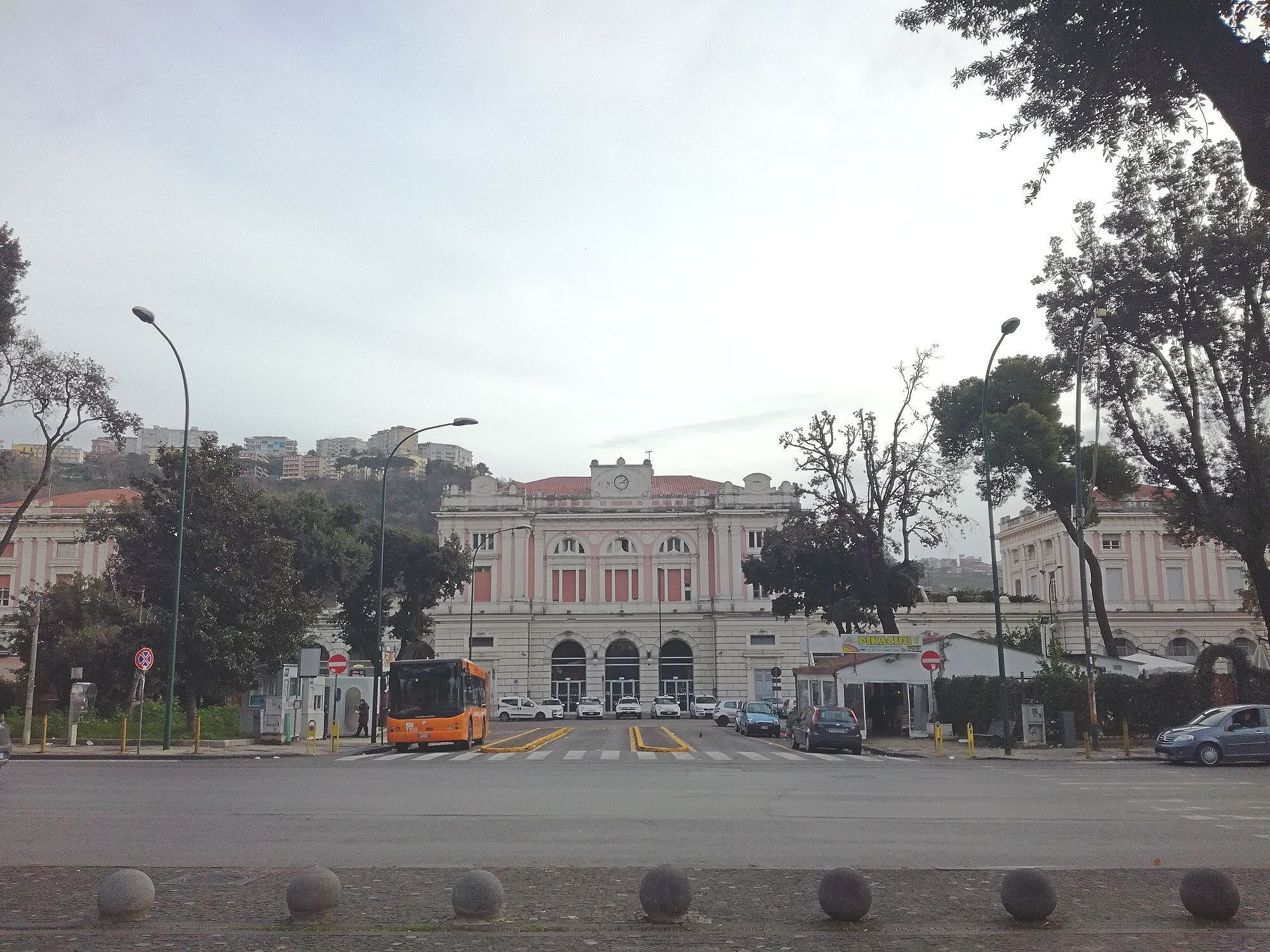
- View of the passenger building.

General information
- Location: Piazzale Vincenzo Tecchio; 80125 Napoli; Naples, Naples, Campania; Italy
- Coordinates: 40°49′21″N 14°11′41″E
- Owner: Rete Ferroviaria Italiana
- Operator: Trenitalia
- Line: Line 2
- Train operators: Trenitalia
- Connections: Naples Metro (Line 6) at Mostra

History
- Opened: 20 September 1925; 101 years ago

Services
Preceding station	Naples SFM	Following station
Napoli Piazza Leopardi towards Pozzuoli Solfatara	Line 2	Cavalleggeri Aosta towards Napoli San Giovanni-Barra
Route map
Location
- Location within Campania Location within Italy

Napoli Campi Flegrei is a railway station on Line 2 of the Naples metropolitan railway service. It was opened on 20 September 1925.

The station is currently managed by Rete Ferroviaria Italiana (RFI). However, the commercial area of the passenger building is managed by Centostazioni. Train services are operated by Trenitalia. Each of these companies is a subsidiary of Ferrovie dello Stato (FS), Italy's state-owned rail company. Campi Flegrei station is situated at Piazzale Vincenzo Tecchio, to the south west of the city centre.

== History ==
The station was opened on 20 September 1925, upon the inauguration of the Villa Literno–Napoli Gianturco railway.

== Passenger and train movements ==
The station has about 9.5 million passenger movements each year.

== See also ==
- History of rail transport in Italy
- List of railway stations in Naples
- List of railway stations in Campania
- Railway stations in Italy
