= Line 2 (Naples) =

Commuter urban railway in Naples, Italy

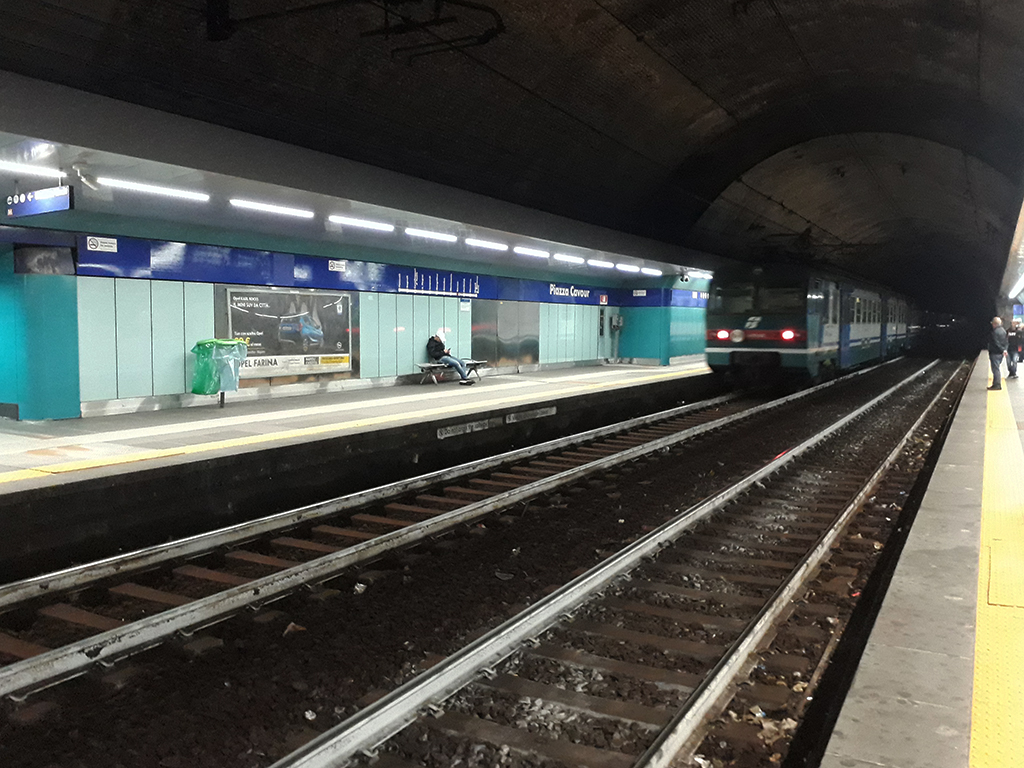
- Train at Napoli Piazza Cavour.

Overview
- Status: Operational
- Locale: Naples, Campania, Italy
- Termini: San Giovanni-Barra; Pozzuoli Solfatara
- Connecting lines: Naples Metro (Line 1 and 6); Cumana; Circumflegrea; Chiaia Funicular
- Stations: 12 (planned total of 13)

Service
- Type: Commuter rail
- System: Naples metropolitan railway service
- Operator: Trenitalia

History
- Opened: 20 September 1925

Technical
- Line length: 18.9 km (11.7 mi)
- Track gauge: 1,435 mm (4 ft 8 1/2 in) standard gauge
- Electrification: 1,500 V DC overhead catenary
Route map

Line 2 (Italian: Linea 2) is an 18.9-kilometre (11.7 mi) commuter rail line, part of the Naples metropolitan railway service (suburban railway service) in Naples, Italy. As of June 2026, Line 2 connects 12 stations. It is operated by Trenitalia.

Line 2 operates on the Naples Passante railway, which crosses the city of Naples from west to east. All regional trains, differently from metropolitan trains, are received by Campi Flegrei station in different platforms.

Line 2 also has some minor regional extensions. These are the Naples-Caserta and Naples-Salerno (all these services use the Passante rapid transit railway, of which the latter two start from Campi Flegrei station).

== History ==
The construction of the line, part of the ″direttissima″ Rome–Naples, was begun in 1911 and after a suspension during World War I, it was completed in 1925 between Pozzuoli and Piazza Garibaldi, electrified with third rail. Two years later the ″direttissima″ was completed, and the electrical rail service was extended towards Villa Literno and San Giovanni-Barra.

In November 1935 the line was also electrified with overhead line; the third rail was discontinued in 1938.

In 1997, the line was numbered as Line 2, while the other Naples Metro line became Line 1. The two lines were connected with a pedestrian tunnel between Museo and Cavour in 2002 and in Garibaldi station in 2012

In 2001, operation of the line was taken over by Metronapoli SpA, a newly established joint stock company in which Trenitalia held a 38% stake. However, in November 2005, operation of line 2 was transferred back to Trenitalia, and that company sold its Metronapoli shares to the municipal government.

Since 2009, the line is crossed only by metropolitan trains.

== Rolling stock ==
The metropolitan service started in 1925 with third rail cars of type E.20 transferred from the Ferrovie Varesine.

In 1938 the third rail system was discontinued, and the E.20 substituted by the newer E.624 equipped with overhead line.

From 1962 to 1963 the E.624 were moved and substituted by the new EMUs of type ALe 803, and from 1983 the ALe 724.

Line 2 also uses ALe 582 (currently no longer in service) and the newest double-decker Treno ad alta frequentazione and Jazz trains.

In 2016, the replacement of ALe 724 began through the supply of 24 ETR 425 "Jazz" trains, these new electric trains, are also used on the Salerno-Naples Campi Flegrei line. The replacement was completed in 2023 through the supply of 12 ETR 104 "Pop" trains, which have a special "metro" configuration, sacrificing seats in favor of the convoy's standing capacity.

== Route ==
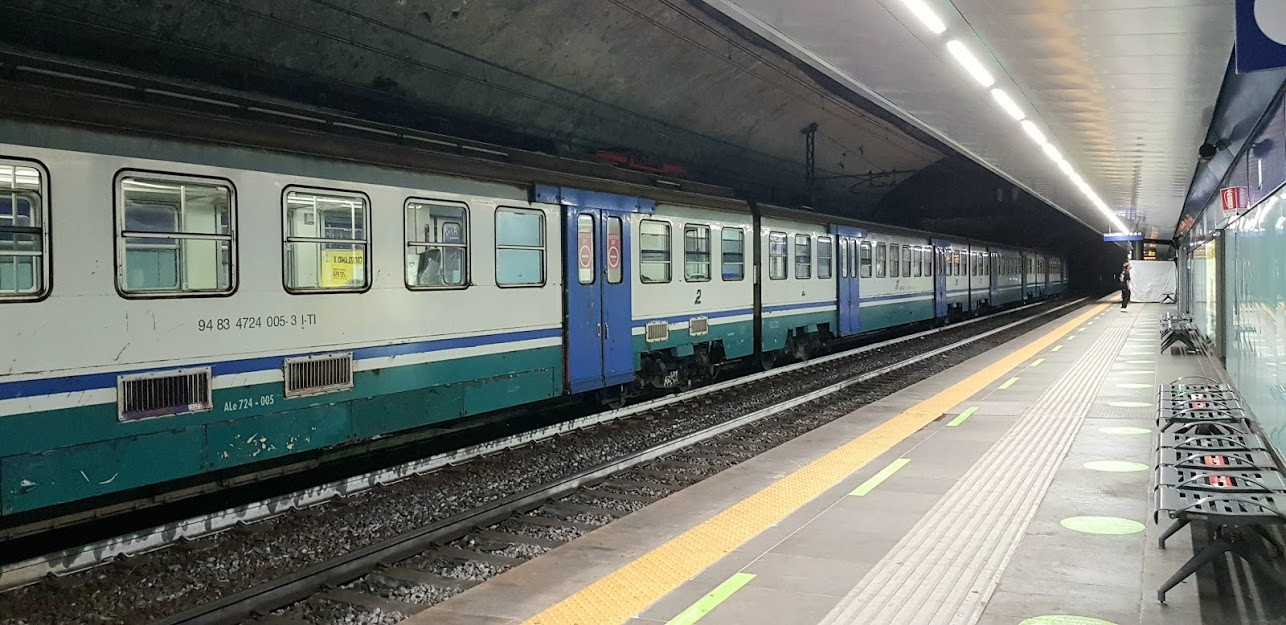
Montesanto station.

Naples Metro Line 2		
Station	Interchanges	Opened
Pozzuoli Solfatara		1925
Bagnoli-Agnano Terme		1927
Porta del Parco		2027
Cavalleggeri Aosta		1957
Napoli Campi Flegrei	Cumana railway, Metro Line 6	1925
Napoli Piazza Leopardi		1927
Napoli Mergellina	Metro Line 6	1925
Napoli Piazza Amedeo	Chiaia Funicular	1925
Napoli Montesanto	Circumflegrea railway, Cumana railway, Montesanto funicular	1925
Napoli Piazza Cavour	Metro Line 1	1925
Napoli Piazza Garibaldi	Central railway station, Circumvesuviana (Line 3, Line 4), Metro Line 1	1925
Napoli Gianturco		1927
Napoli Galileo Ferraris	Under construction	TBA
Napoli San Giovanni–Barra		2014

== Map ==
Line 2 (Naples)

== See also ==
- Naples metropolitan railway service
- Rail transport in Italy

== Bibliography ==
- Cornolò, Giovanni (1994). Locomotive elettriche FS. Ermanno Albertelli Editore. ISBN 88-85909-97-3.
- Cornolò, Giovanni (2011). Automotrici elettriche dalle origini al 1983. Duegi. ISBN 978-88-95096-05-6.
