= Napoli San Giovanni–Barra railway station =

Railway station in Naples, Italy

Napoli San Giovanni–Barra
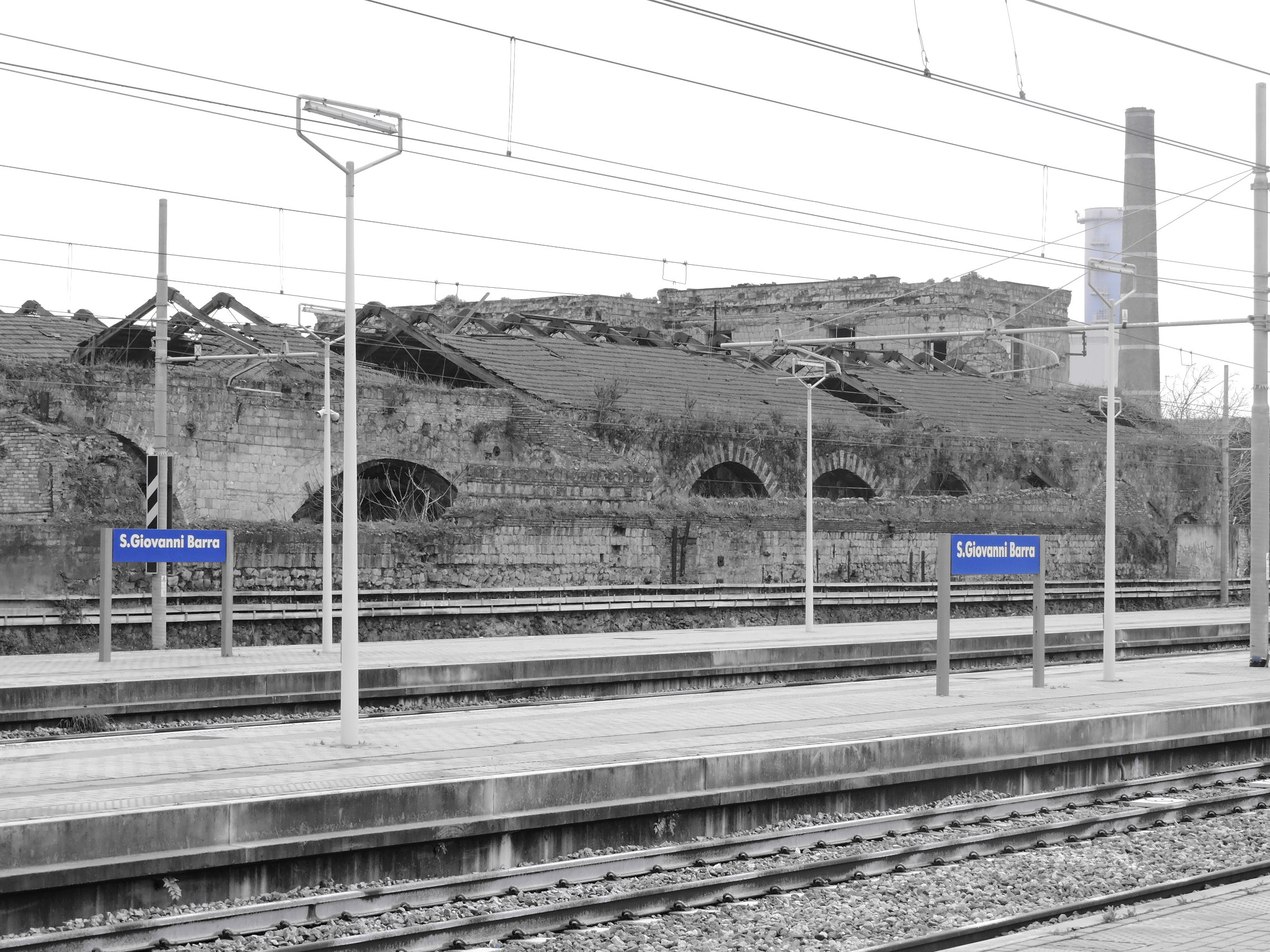
- Platform

General information
- Coordinates: 40.8331°N 14.3054°E
- Operator: Trenitalia
- Line: Line 2

Other information
- Status: In use

History
- Opening: June 2010

Services
| Preceding station | Naples SFM | Following station |
|---|---|---|
| Napoli Gianturco towards Pozzuoli Solfatara | Line 2 | Terminus |
Route map
Location

Napoli San Giovanni–Barra (Italian: Stazione di Napoli San Giovanni–Barra) is a railway station served by the railway Line 2 of Naples as one of its terminus.

== History ==
Opened at the end of the 19th century, the new station was activated on 28 November 1909 to replace the old one. In the early 2000s it underwent substantial modernization works, completed in 2010. The new platforms were relocated about a hundred meters (in the direction of Naples) from the original ones, on the site of the old goods yard, abandoned at the end of the 1990s. The entrance to the station, which always takes place from Piazza San Giovanni Battista, where the old station building is located, leads to a large parking lot and to the sidewalks. Next to the station is the tram depot, as well as the terminus stop, of San Giovanni a Teduccio. The car park has never actually been open to the public, despite being a useful train-car interchange to reach the center and the western suburbs of the city.

Since 14 December 2014 the station serves as the terminus for the metropolitan trains of line 2 of the Naples Metro.

== See also ==
- History of rail transport in Italy
- List of railway stations in Naples
- List of railway stations in Campania
- Railway stations in Italy
