= Pozzuoli Solfatara railway station =

Railway station in Pozzuoli, Italy

Pozzuoli Solfatara
- The platform in June 2026

General information
- Location: Via Giacinto Diano; 80078 Pozzuoli; Pozzuoli, Metropolitan City of Naples, Campania; Italy
- Coordinates: 40°49′40.8″N 14°07′33.24″E
- Line: Line 2
- Platforms: 3
- Tracks: 5
- Train operators: Trenitalia

Construction
- Structure type: At-grade

History
- Opened: 20 September 1925; 101 years ago

Services
Preceding station	Naples SFM	Following station
Terminus	Line 2	Bagnoli-Agnano Terme towards Napoli San Giovanni-Barra
Route map
Location
- Location within Campania Location within Italy

Pozzuoli Solfatara is a station of the Naples metropolitan railway service, located in the municipality of Pozzuoli, in the Metropolitan City of Naples. Together with Napoli San Giovanni–Barra, it is a terminus of Line 2, and it is situated on the Passante Ferroviario di Napoli.

== History ==
The station entered service on 20 September 1925, with the opening of the metropolitan section ending at Gianturco.

== Station building ==
The station has five through tracks for passenger traffic. Two of them are used by trains that pass through or only stop here, while the other three serve as the terminus for metropolitan trains. There are three platforms, connected by an underpass. The station is classified by RFI in the "Silver" category, and is currently being restored as part of the Pegasus project. The station also has a freight yard, which is no longer in use because no freight service is operated.

== Passenger and train movements ==
Passenger traffic is high throughout the day. Metropolitan trains to Napoli San Giovanni–Barra depart from here and, although on different platforms, regional trains to Napoli Campi Flegrei and Villa Literno also stop at the station.

== Interchange ==
- Bus stop

== See also ==
- History of rail transport in Italy
- List of railway stations in Campania
- Railway stations in Italy

== Bibliography ==
- Rete Ferroviaria Italiana, Fascicolo Linea 129 (Villa Literno - Napoli Gianturco).
