= Naples metropolitan railway service =

Commuter rail system in Naples, Italy

Naples Metropolitan Railway Service
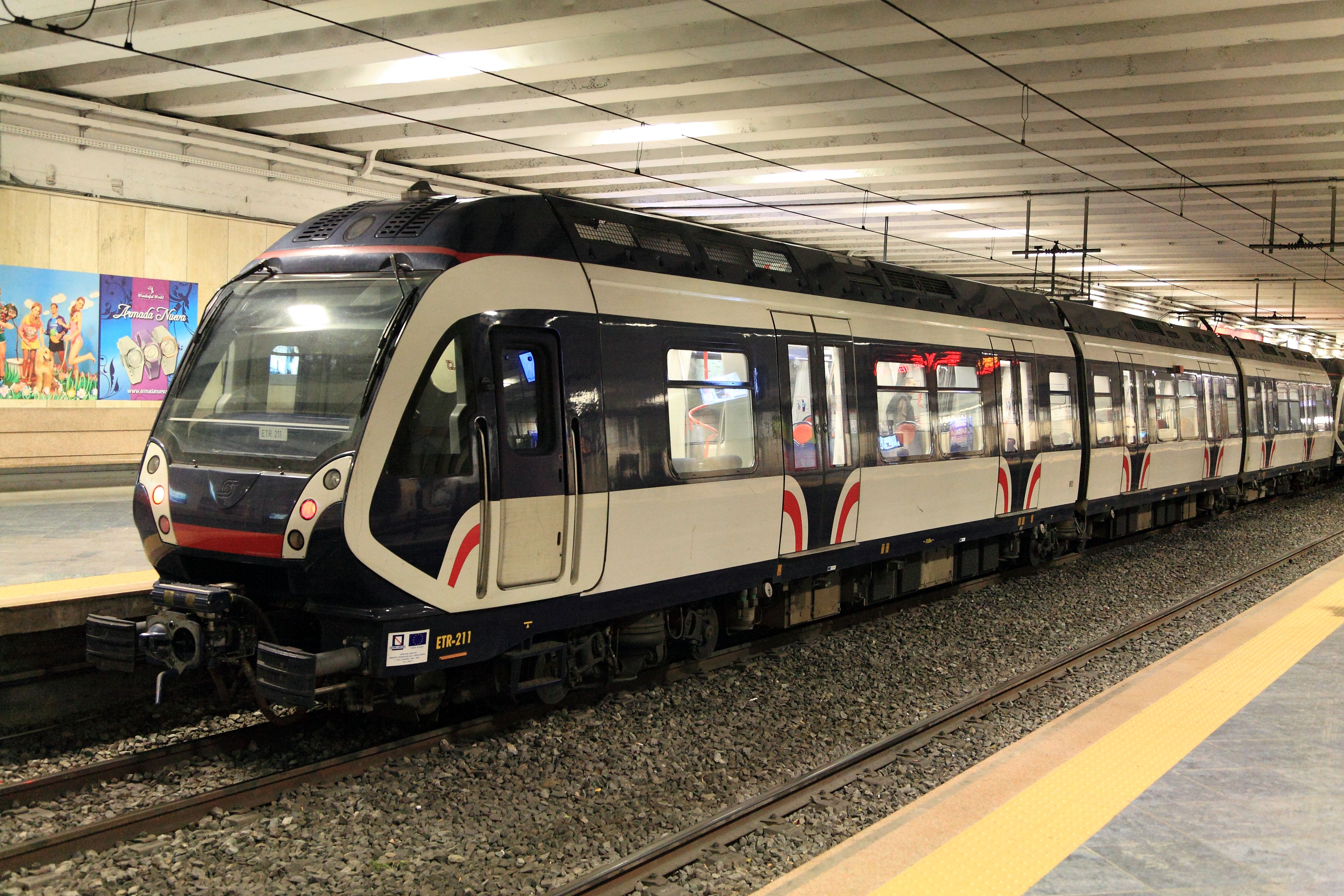
- The EAV (Ente Autonomo Volturno)-owned Circumvesuviana train at Napoli Garibaldi station

Overview
- Owner: Regione Campania; Rete Ferroviaria Italiana (Line 2)
- Locale: Metropolitan City of Naples
- Transit type: Commuter rail
- Number of lines: 8
- Number of stations: 129
- Daily ridership: 185.235 (2023)
- Annual ridership: 67.610.775 (2023)

Operation
- Began operation: 1884
- Operators: Ente Autonomo Volturno, Trenitalia
- Number of vehicles: See below

Technical
- System length: 208.45 kilometres (129.52 mi)
- Track gauge: 950 mm (3 ft 1 3/8 in) narrow gauge (Circumvesuviana); 1,435 mm (4 ft 8 1/2 in) standard gauge (others)

The Naples Metropolitan Railway Service (Italian: Servizio ferroviario metropolitano di Napoli), is a commuter rail system serving the metropolitan area of Naples, Italy. The system comprises 7 lines operated by Ente Autonomo Volturno and 1 line (Line 2) operated by Trenitalia, serving 129 stations.

Line 2 also has same regional extensions which reach Formia, Capua, Castellamare and Salerno.

== History ==
=== Line 2 ===
The construction of the line, part of the ″direttissima″ Rome–Naples, was begun in 1911 and after a suspension during World War I, it was completed in 1925 between Pozzuoli and Piazza Garibaldi, electrified with third rail. Two years later the ″direttissima″ was completed, and the electrical rail service was extended towards Villa Literno and Gianturco.

In November 1935 the line was also electrified with overhead line; the third rail was discontinued in 1938.

In 1997, the line was numbered as Line 2, while the proper metro line became Line 1. The two lines were connected with a pedestrian tunnel between Museo and Cavour in 2002. Operation of Line 2 was transferred to Metronapoli SpA, a newly established joint stock company in which Trenitalia held a 38% stake, but it was transferred back to Trenitalia in November 2005, when Trenitalia sold its Metronapoli shares to the municipal government.

Nowadays the line is crossed by urban trains, and also by regional trains that reach Formia (westbound) and Capua, Castellammare and Salerno (eastbound).

== Network ==
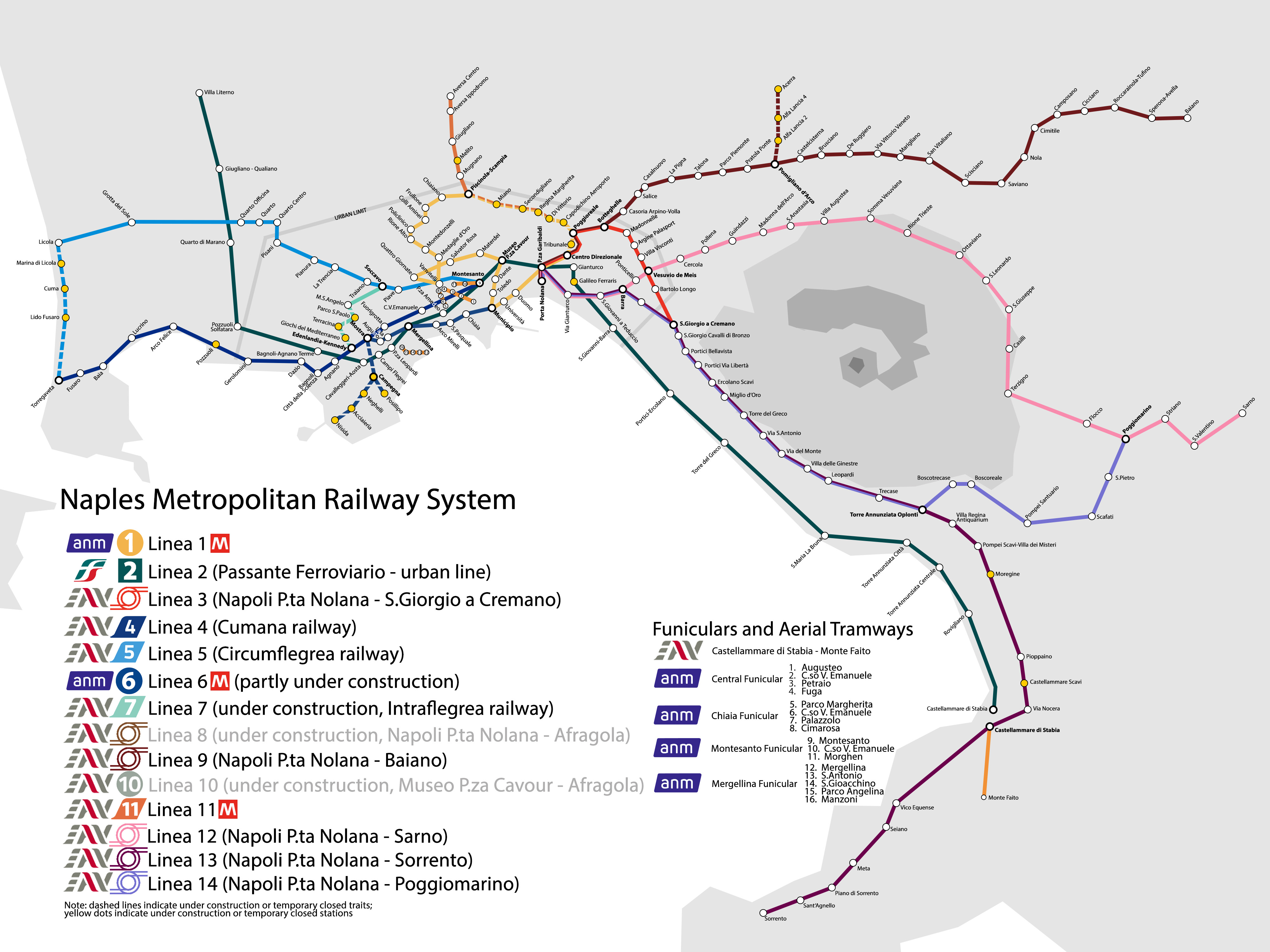

As of 2024, there are 8 operational lines.

Network	Railway	Terminals	Line No.	Year opened	Last extension	Length	Stations	Operator
Circumvesuviana	Naples–San Giorgio a Cremano	Napoli Porta Nolana–San Giorgio a Cremano	3	1884	2004	12,0 km	11	EAV
Circumvesuviana	Naples–Baiano	Napoli Porta Nolana–Baiano	9	1884	2006	38 km	30	EAV
Circumvesuviana	Naples–Sarno	Napoli Porta Nolana–Sarno	12	1981	1904	38,0 km	26	EAV
Circumvesuviana	Naples–Sorrento	Napoli Porta Nolana–Sorrento	13	1934	2017	26,0 km	16	EAV
Circumvesuviana	Naples–Poggiomarino	Napoli Porta Nolana–Poggiomarino	14	1904	-	35,0 km	29	EAV
Cumana		Montesanto–Torregaveta	4	1889	1890	19,8 km	15	EAV
Circumflegrea		Montesanto–Torregaveta	5	1962	1986	27,0 km	16	EAV
Line 2 (Passante Ferroviario)		Pozzuoli Solfatara–Napoli San Giovanni–Barra	2	1925	2014	18,9 km	12	Trenitalia
Line 7		Soccavo–Monte Sant'Angelo	7	2025	-	4,5 km	1 (+4 planned)	EAV

In 1997, a numbering system was implemented for all public transport lines in Naples through the Municipal Transport Plan; however, only the numbering of lines 2 and 7 is actually used. The other lines, although assigned a number, have never been effectively recognized and continue to be identified locally by the name of their network or route.

=== Circumvesuviana ===
Circumvesuviana is a railway company operating services in the East of the Naples metropolitan area. Electrically powered throughout, the system uses the narrow gauge of 950 mm (3 ft 1 3/8 in) and operates 142 km (88 mi) of route on six lines. It is entirely separate from other national and regional railway lines. It has 96 stations with an average interstation distance of 1.5 km (0.9 mi).

The Circumvesuviana railway service covers a wide catchment area of over 2 million people, distributed in 47 municipalities, including Scafati, San Valentino Torio and Sarno in the province of Salerno and Avella and Baiano in the province of Avellino. The network forms an important commercial artery, and provides services to the important tourist destinations of Pompeii and Herculaneum.

All routes start from the Napoli Porta Nolana terminus near the Porta Nolana, and pass through Napoli Garibaldi station before splitting into several branches to towns in the province. A journey along the entirety of the longest route, the 47 km (29 mi) from Naples to Sorrento, takes about one hour.

=== Cumana ===
The Cumana railway is a commuter railway in Campania, southern Italy, connecting Naples by two separate routes with Torregaveta, near Cuma in the town of Bacoli (about 15 km west of Naples). It passes through Pozzuoli and the volcanic Campi Flegrei area. The line was built and run by the Società per le Ferrovie Napoletane (the Neapolitan Railway Company), founded in 1883, and is now operated by the EAV company.

=== Circumflegrea ===
The Circumflegrea railway is a commuter railway line that connects Naples city centre with the northern Phlegraean Fields, a suburban area located west of the city.

=== Alifana railway ===
The Alifana Railway (in Italian Ferrovia Alifana) is a regional commuter railway line located in the Campania region of Italy. The name derives from that of the area of the same name in which the Piedimonte d'Alife terminal station is located, called, since 1974, Piedimonte Matese. The lines, owned by the Campania Region, have been entrusted for management to the Ente Autonomo Volturno (EAV) company, which operates there as both infrastructure manager and railway company.

The company was inaugurated on March 30, 1913, with a first service held on the line Naples P.zza Carlo III Station-Santa Maria Capua Vetere/S.Andrea dei Lagni-Biforcazione-Capua (43 km), with 11,000 V 25 Hz monophase AC electric traction. Service from Caiazzo to Piedimonte began in 1914, held with steam locomotives. A line from Naples/Secondigliano to Santa Maria Capua Vetere was opened later. Gauge was 935 mm for both lines.

The railway suffered heavy damage during World War II. While the first line was restored in 1963, using standard gauge and diesel traction, the railroad from Secondigliano did not receive the same attention, and, despite its high traffic, was closed in 1976 and replaced by bus service. This move was to be temporary, but only in 2005 a renewed section of the line, connecting Piscinola to Mugnano, was reopened as subway line.

In the same year the whole service on the Alifana railroad was acquired by the new public company MetroCampania NordEst. It's currently the remaining unelectrified line of the EAV network, as all other lines are electrified, but because it the electrification started (later abandoned), electrification poles are in place on the railway.

== Projects ==
=== Line 7 ===
Line 7 will run in a circular line connecting the Cumana and Circumflegrea railways via 4 new stops at Monte Sant'Angelo, Parco San Paolo, Terracina and Giochi del Mediterraneo. The existing station Zoo-Edenlandia will be renamed as Kennedy.

== Rolling Stock ==
=== Ente Autonomo Volturno (EAV) ===
- 38 Circumvesuviana ETR 001-085 electric trains. Built by Sofer/Asgen between 1971 and 1978, powered at 1500 V DC, equipped with disc brakes, low-floor boarding. Track gauge: 950 mm.
- 25 Circumvesuviana ETR 086-118 electric trains. Built by Sofer in 1988, powered at 1500 V DC, equipped with disc brakes, low-floor boarding. Track gauge: 950 mm. 15 of them underwent revamping between 2019 and 2021.
- 22 Circumvesuviana ETR 201-226 Metrostar electric trains. Built by Ansaldobreda/Firema in 2008/2009, powered at 1500 V DC, equipped with disc brakes, low-floor boarding. Track gauge: 950 mm.
- 13 ET 400 Cumana and Circumflegrea electric trains. Delivered by Firema between 1991 and 1998 based on the Firema E 82 design and revamped between 2013 and 2022. Powered at 3,000 V DC. Standard gauge.
- 14 ET 500 Cumana and Circumflegrea electric trains. Delivered by Titagarh FiReMa Adler between 2017 and 2021. Powered at 3,000 V DC. Standard gauge.
- 4 Firema E 126 electric trains. Built by Firema in the 1980s. Powered at 3,000 V DC.
- 9 ETR 243 electric trains. Delivered by Titagarh Firema Adler between 2017 and 2019. Powered at 3,000 V DC.
- 5 MCNE railcars. Built by Fiat in 1981/82 based on the ALn 668.3000 FS model, classified as ALn 668 005-009. Standard gauge.
- 4 MCNE railcars. Purchased from FS, built by Fiat between 1956 and 1963, originally classified under the ALn 668.1400 group; now numbered 103, 113, 116, and 118. Standard gauge.
- 2 MCNE railcars. Built by Fiat in 1991 based on the ALn 663 model, classified as ALn 663 010-011. Standard gauge.
- 5 ATR 803 trains for the former Alifana line. Built by Stadler, classified as ATR 803, numbered 301, 302, 303, 304, and 305.

=== Trenitalia ===
- 24 ETR 425 “Jazz” trains
- 12 ETR 104 “Pop” trains
- ALe 501 “Minuetto” trains

==== Image gallery ====
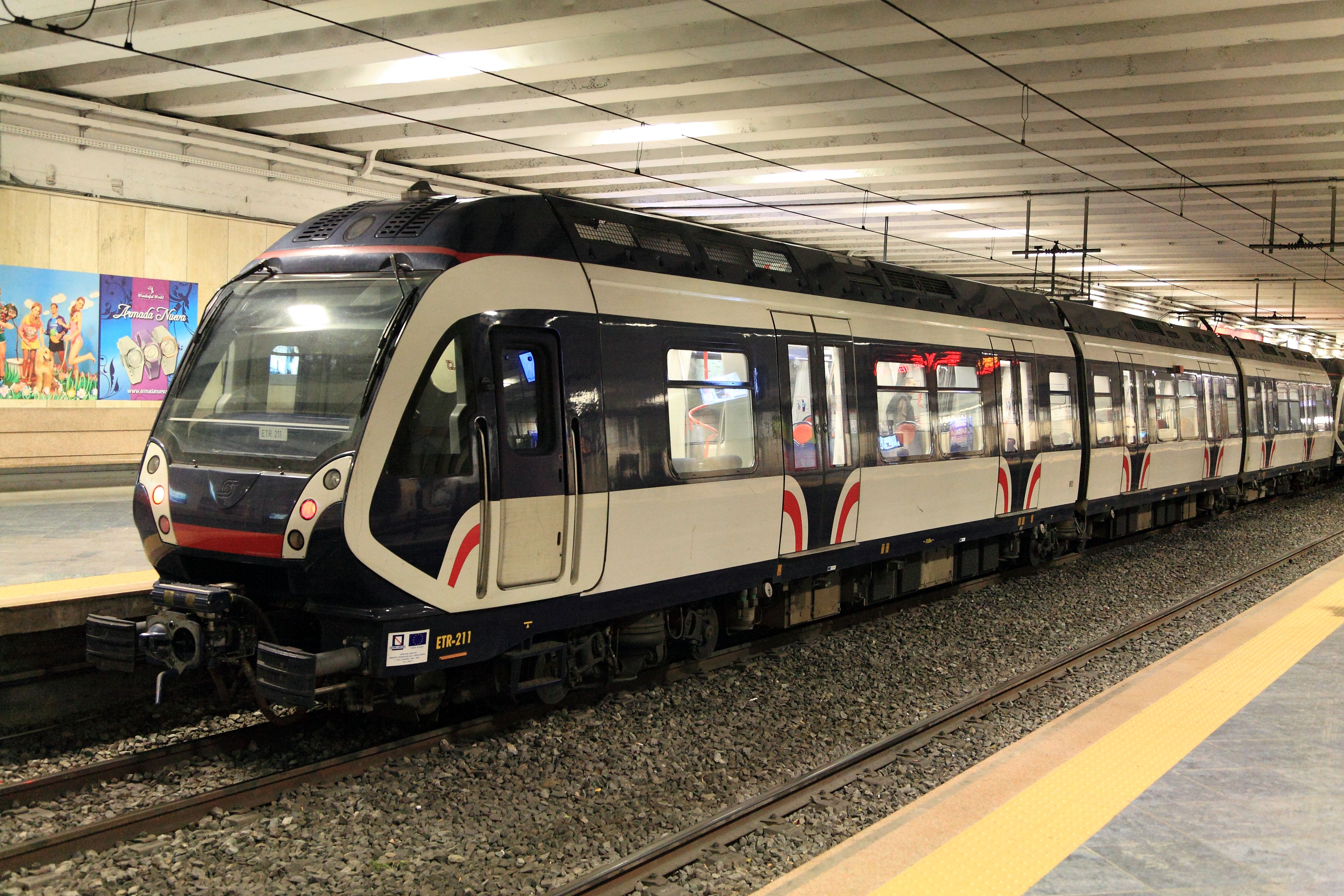
ETR 201-226

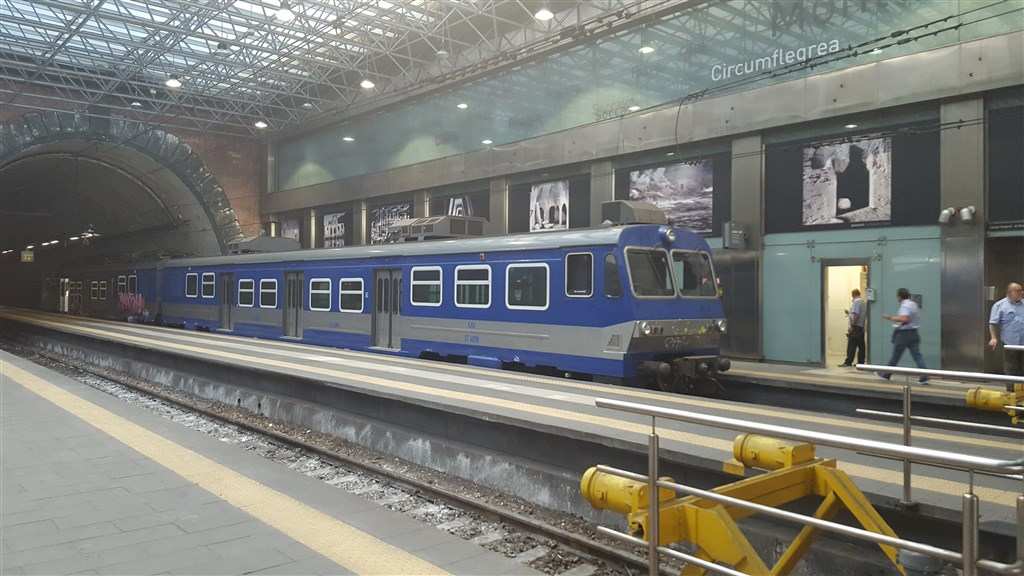
EAV ET.400

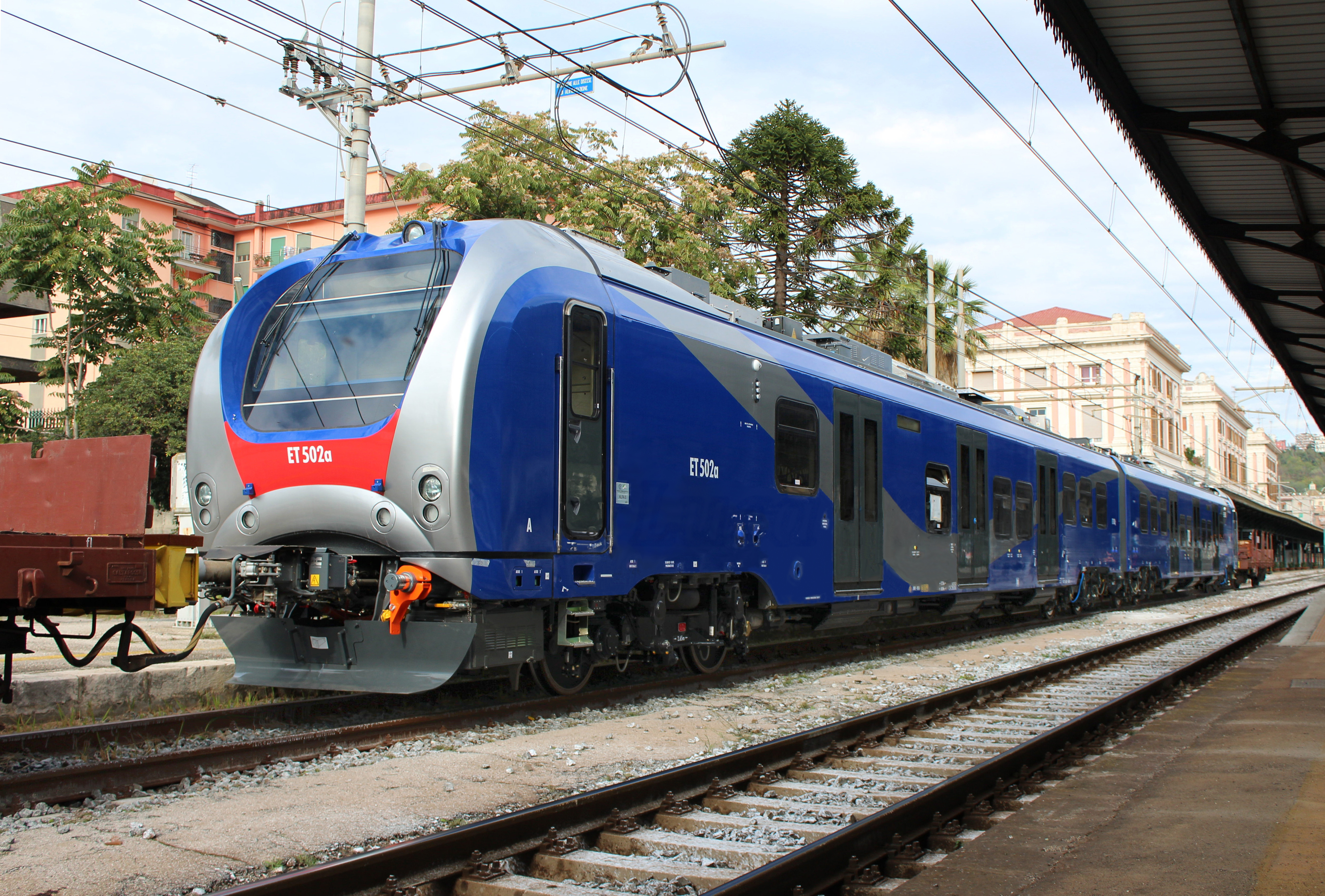
EAV ET.500

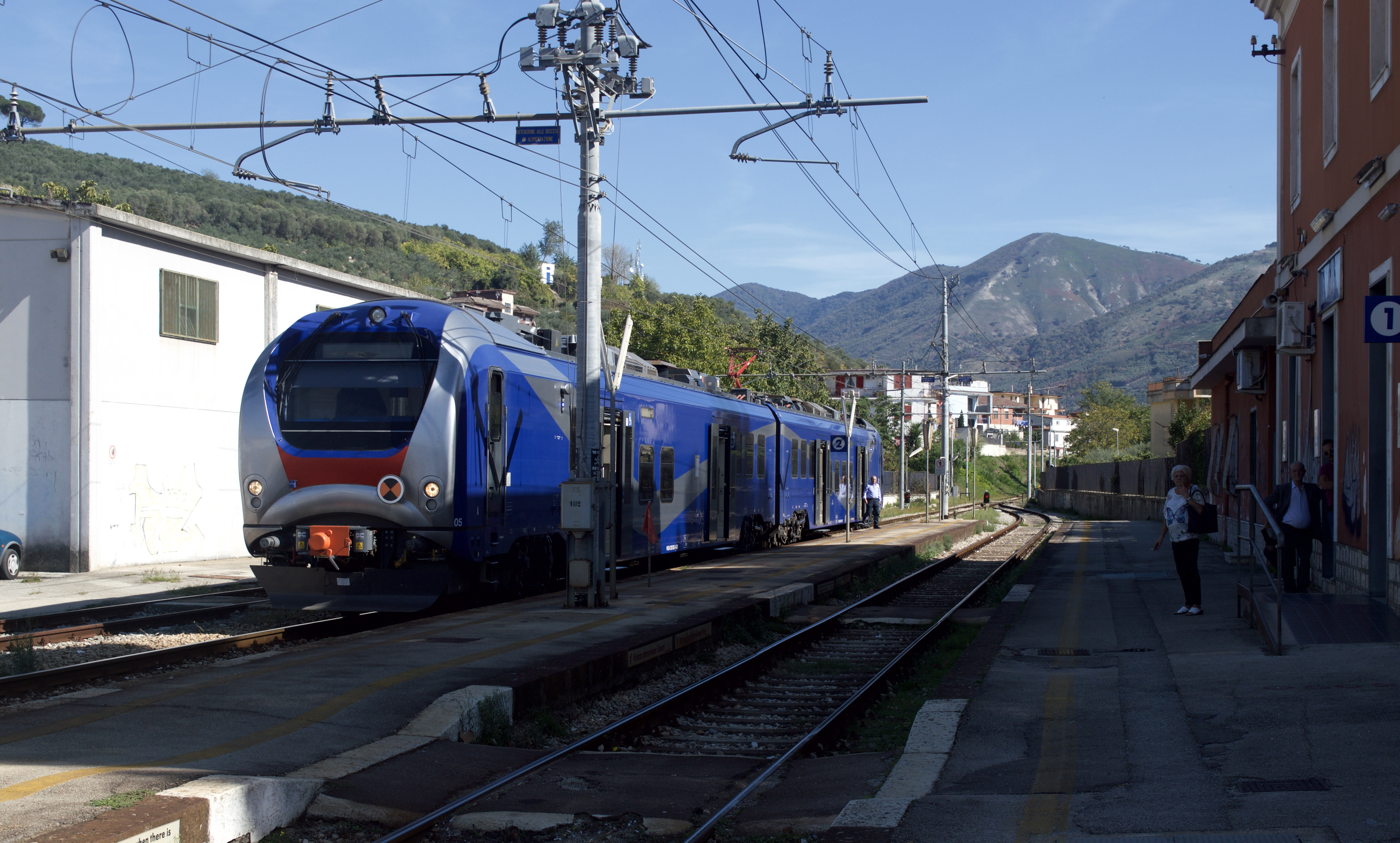
EAV TFA Alfa 2

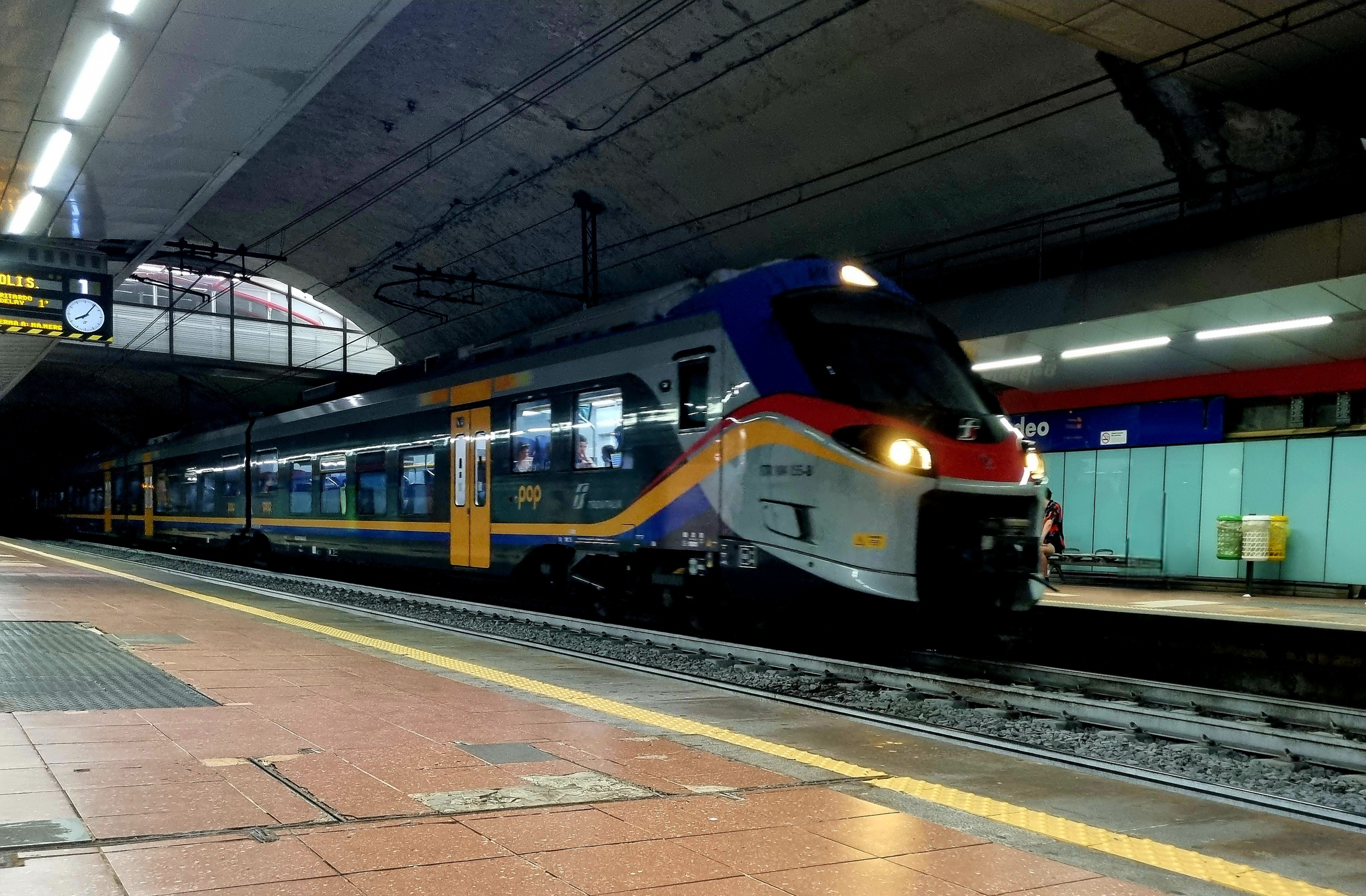
Trenitalia ETR 104 "Pop"

== See also ==
- Line 2 (Naples)
- Circumvesuviana
