= San Giorgio a Cremano railway station =

Railway station in San Giorgio a Cremano, Naples, Italy

San Giorgio a Cremano
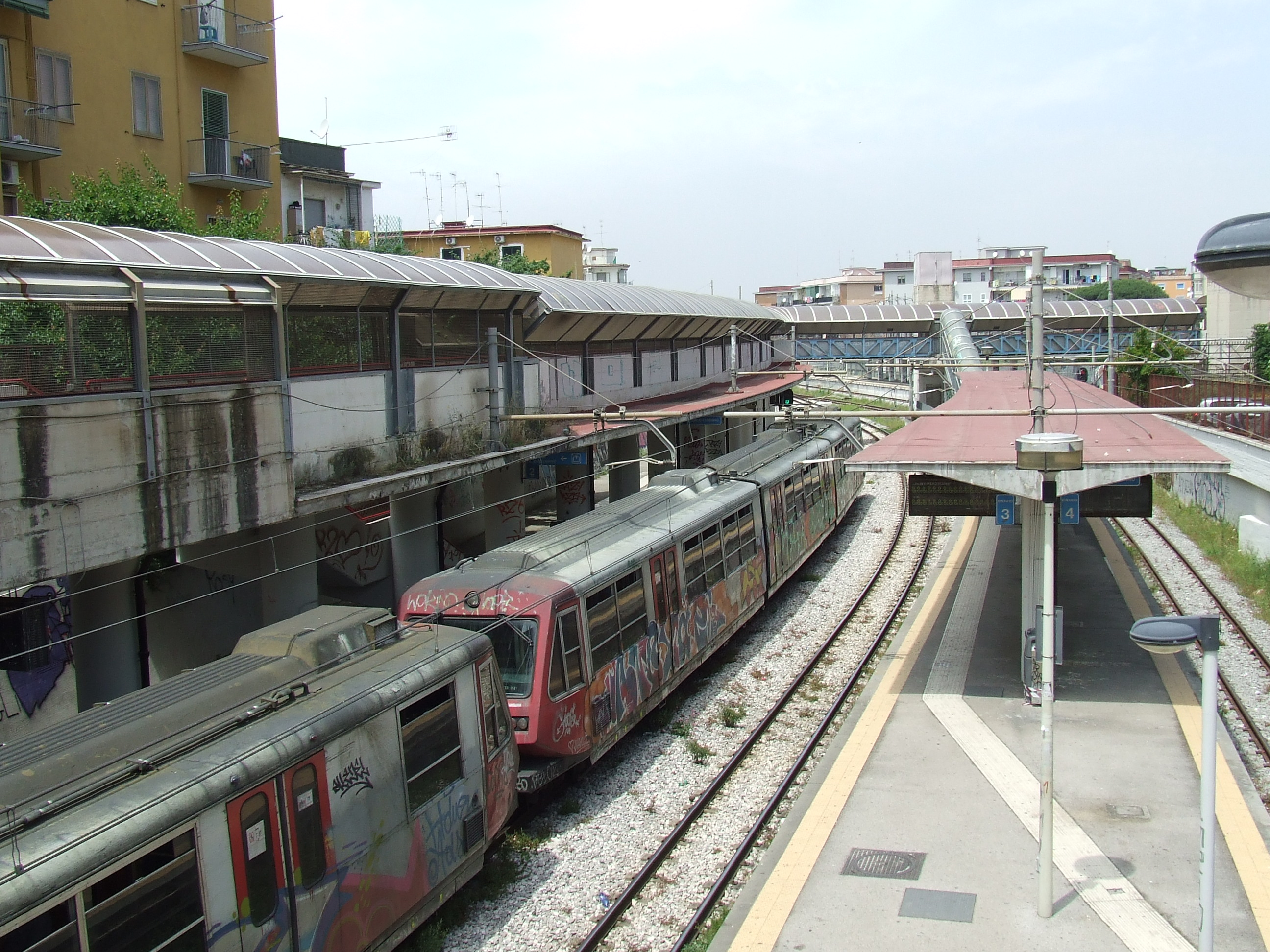

General information
- Location: Piazza Trieste e Trento, San Giorgio a Cremano 80046 NA; San Giorgio a Cremano, Metropolitan City of Naples, Campania; Italy
- Coordinates: 40°49′58.8″N 14°20′15.72″E
- Line: Circumvesuviana Naples-Sorrento line Naples-Poggiomarino line
- Train operators: EAV

History
- Opened: 1904; 122 years ago

Services
Preceding station	Circumvesuviana	Following station
Napoli Garibaldi towards Napoli Porta Nolana	Naples-Sorrento line	Portici Bellavista towards Sorrento
Preceding station	Circumvesuviana	Following station
Santa Maria del Pozzo towards Napoli Porta Nolana	Naples-Poggiomarino line	San Giorgio Cavalli di Bronzo towards Poggiomarino
Location
- Location within Campania Location within Italy

San Giorgio a Cremano railway station is a railway station in San Giorgio a Cremano, Metropolitan City of Naples, Italy. It is served by the Naples-Sorrento and Naples-Poggiomarino lines of Circumvesuviana railway network, managed by EAV.

== History ==
The station was inaugurated along with the line from Napoli Porta Nolana to Poggiomarino and has undergone, over the years, the same developments as other stations on the route, including electrification and platform elevation.

In the late 1990s, the station underwent a significant transformation following the opening of the line to Naples via the Centro Direzionale. This led to an expansion of the track yard and the construction of overpasses.

== Station layout ==
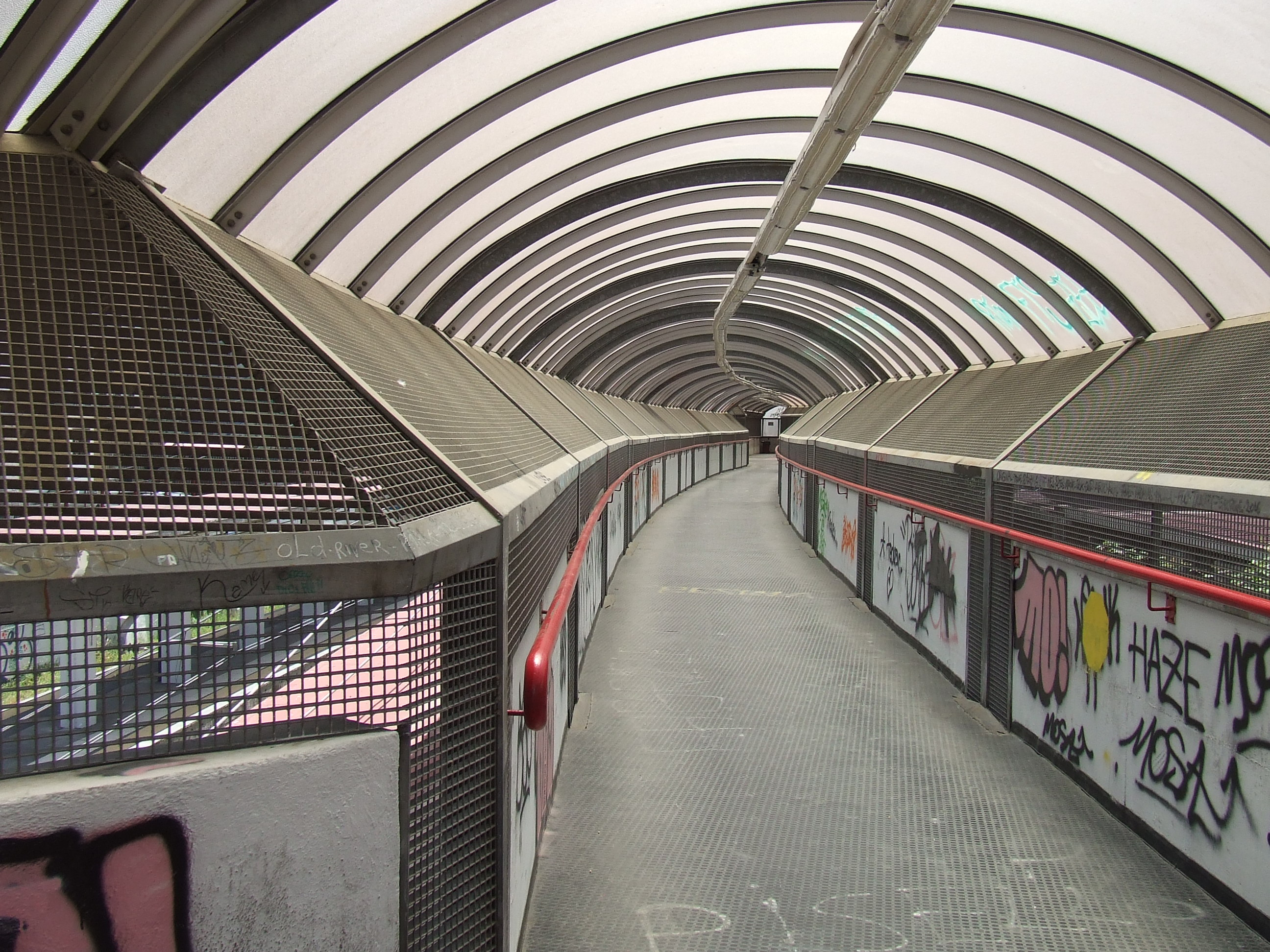
Suspended corridor connecting the tracks of the Naples–Poggiomarino line with those of the Naples–San Giorgio line.

Originally, the station was equipped with three through tracks; these were later supplemented by three terminal tracks coming from Naples. There are three platforms, each covered by canopies and connected by two overpasses.

The station building is arranged on two levels: the upper floor, which is at street level, houses the entrance and ticket office, while the lower floor provides access to the tracks.

== Passenger movement ==
All accelerati trains to Naples and Poggiomarino stop at the station, along with a few short-turn services terminating at Torre Annunziata Oplonti and some direttissimi to Sorrento. The station also serves as the terminus for trains to Naples via Centro Direzionale.

== Connections ==
- Bus stop

== See also ==
- List of railway stations in Campania
