= Torre del Greco railway station (Circumvesuviana) =

Railway station in Torre del Greco, Naples, Italy

Torre del Greco
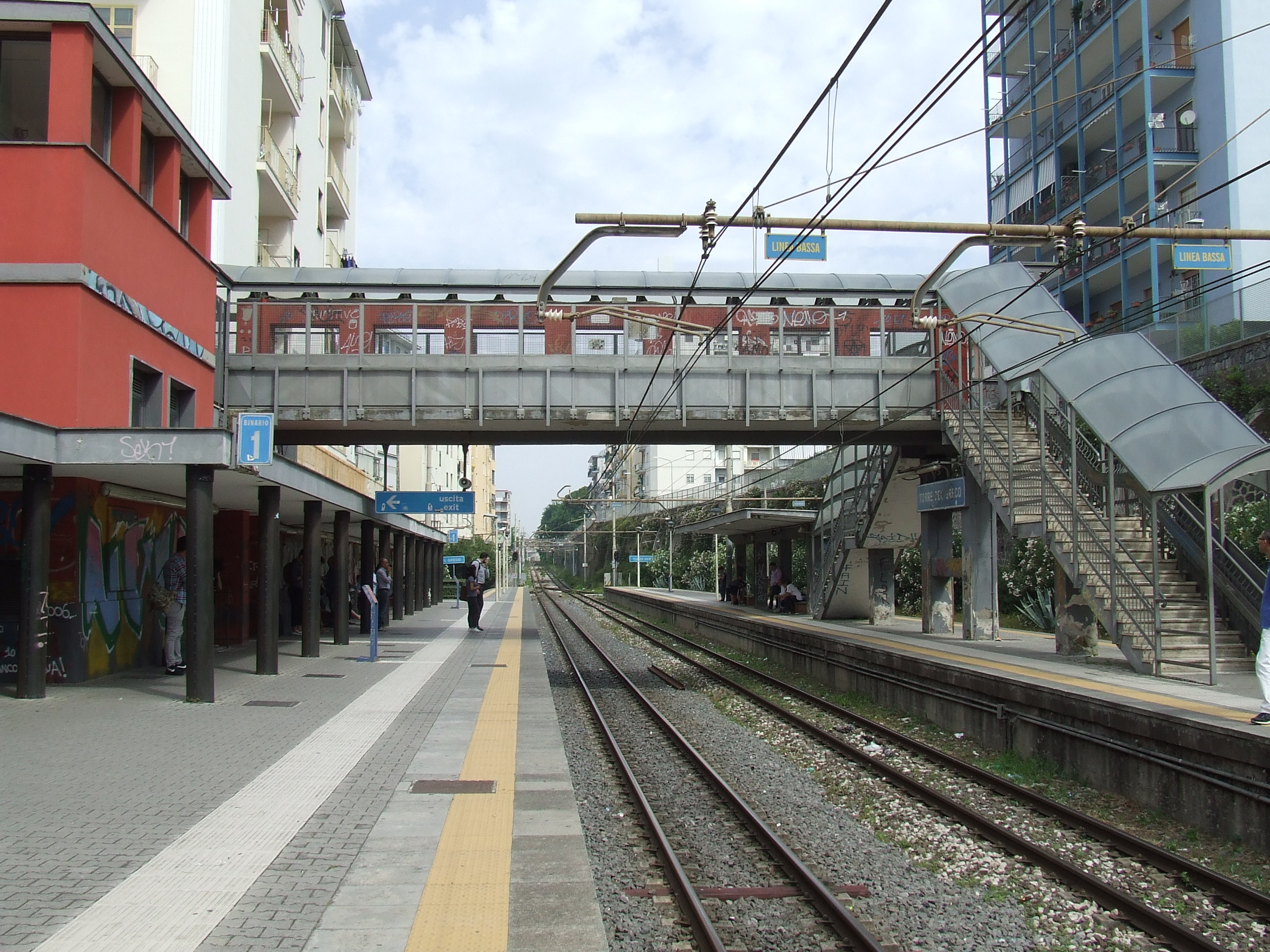
- Platform and overpass area.

General information
- Location: Viale Ungheria, Torre del Greco 80059 NA; Torre del Greco, Metropolitan City of Naples, Campania; Italy
- Coordinates: 40°47′35.88″N 14°22′12″E
- Line: Circumvesuviana Naples-Sorrento line Naples-Poggiomarino line
- Train operators: EAV

History
- Opened: 1904; 122 years ago

Services
| Preceding station | Circumvesuviana | Following station |
|---|---|---|
| Ercolano Scavi towards Napoli Porta Nolana | Naples-Sorrento line | Torre Annunziata Oplonti towards Sorrento |
| Preceding station | Circumvesuviana | Following station |
|---|---|---|
| Miglio d'Oro towards Napoli Porta Nolana | Naples-Sorrento line | Via Sant'Antonio towards Sorrento |
Location
- Location within Campania Location within Italy

Torre del Greco railway station is a railway station in Torre del Greco, Metropolitan City of Naples, Italy. It is served by the Naples-Sorrento and Naples-Poggiomarino lines of Circumvesuviana railway network, managed by EAV.

== History ==
Inaugurated in 1904 along with the line to Poggiomarino. In 1948, following the double-tracking works on the line to Naples, the new station building was brought into service.

== Station layout ==
The station features a two-level passenger building: the upper level, located at street level, houses the ticket office and the corridor connecting to the second and third tracks, while the lower level is situated at track level.

The station has three through tracks, served by two platforms equipped with canopies. The platform between the second and third tracks is directly connected to the station exit via an overpass.

As with all other Circumvesuviana stations, the station does not include a freight terminal.

== Passenger movement ==
The station is served by all trains heading to Naples, Poggiomarino, and Sorrento, as well as a few short-turn services terminating at Torre Annunziata Oplonti. It experiences high passenger traffic throughout the day and is one of the busiest stations on the entire line.

== Connections ==
- Bus stop

== See also ==
- List of railway stations in Campania
