= Portici Bellavista railway station =

Railway station in Portici, Naples, Italy

Portici Bellavista
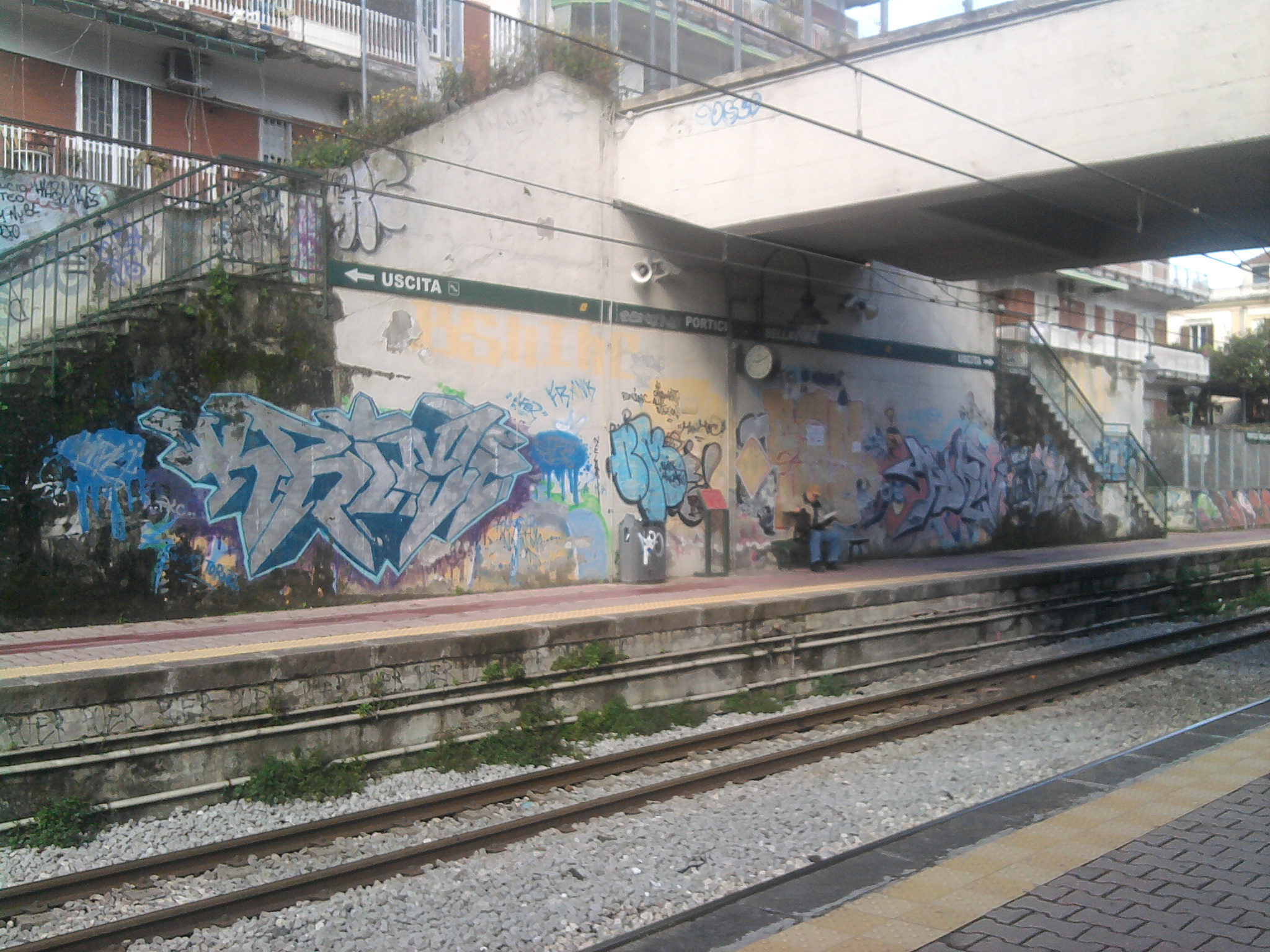

General information
- Location: Via Quattro Novembre, Portici 80055 NA; Portici, Metropolitan City of Naples, Campania; Italy
- Coordinates: 40°49′21.72″N 14°20′35.16″E
- Line: Circumvesuviana Naples-Poggiomarino line
- Train operators: EAV

History
- Opened: 1927; 99 years ago

Services
Preceding station	Circumvesuviana	Following station
San Giorgio Cavalli di Bronzo towards Napoli Porta Nolana	Naples-Poggiomarino line	Portici Via Libertà towards Poggiomarino
Location
- Location within Campania Location within Italy

Portici railway station is a railway station in Portici, Metropolitan City of Naples, Italy. It is served by the Naples-Poggiomarino line of Circumvesuviana railway network, managed by EAV.

== History ==
The station was inaugurated in 1927, based on a design by engineer Carlo Avena, son of the renowned Adolfo Avena, and replaced the previous station located a few hundred metres further south, known as "Cassano–Campitelli–Bellavista."

In the early 2000s, the station underwent a renovation project led by architect Nicola Pagliara, which included the installation of elevators and the restoration of the historic Art Nouveau station building, dating back to the early 20th century. The building is now used by various civic associations.

== Station layout ==
The station features a passenger building suspended above the railway line below, which houses the ticket office. Access to the two platforms serving the through tracks is provided via two side staircases and elevators.

== Passenger movement ==
All accelerati trains to Naples, Poggiomarino, and Torre Annunziata Oplonti stop at the station, along with some direttissimi services to Sorrento.

== Connections ==
- Bus stop

== See also ==
- List of railway stations in Campania
