= Pompei Santuario railway station =

Railway station in Pompei, Italy

Pompei Santuario
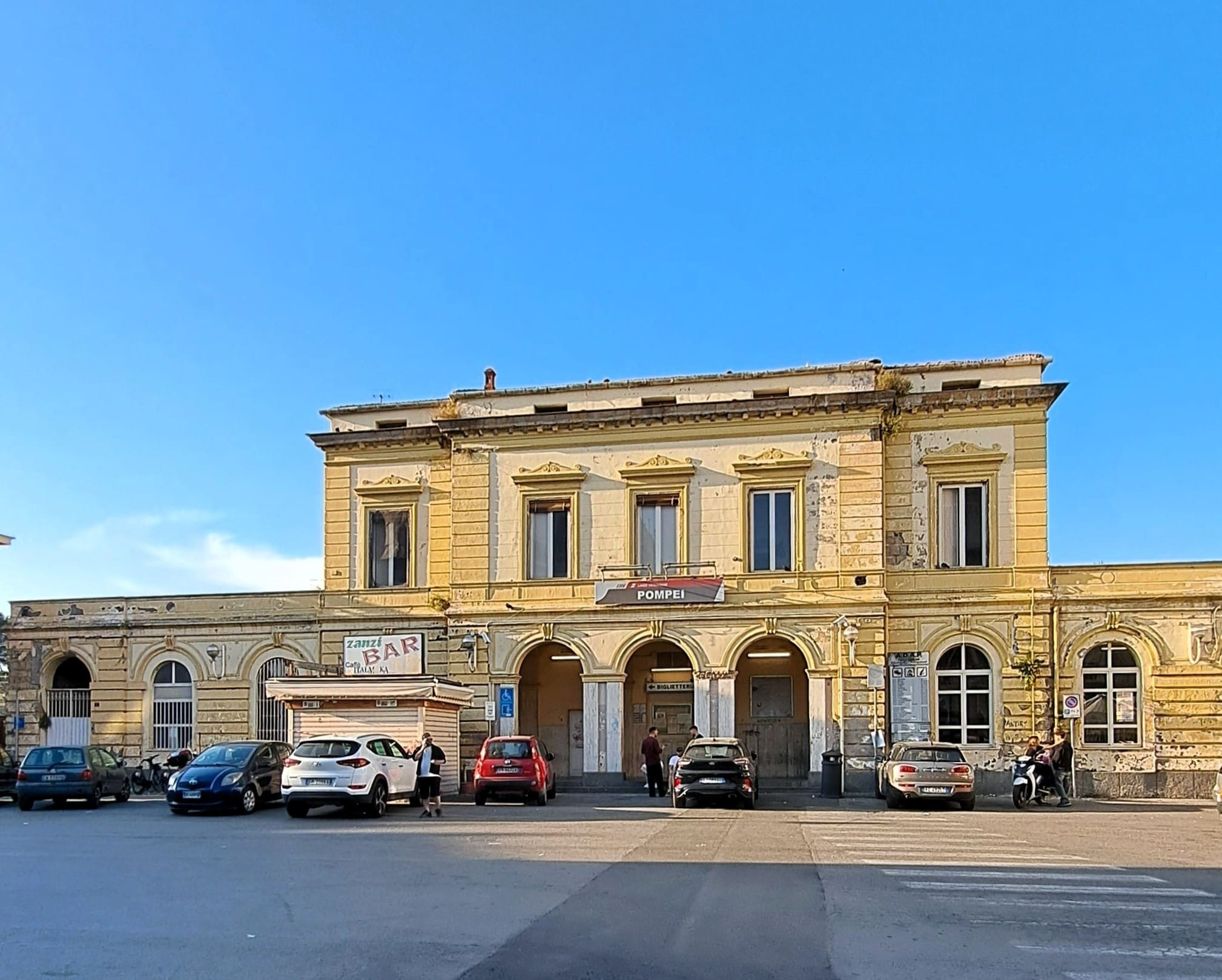
- Pompei Scavi station building

General information
- Location: Piazza Vittorio Veneto; Pompei NA 80045
- Coordinates: 40°45′04.24″N 14°30′05.89″E
- System: Circumvesuviana commuter rail station
- Line: Naples-Poggiomarino line
- Tracks: 3

Construction
- Accessible: yes

History
- Opened: 1904; 122 years ago

Services
| Preceding station | Circumvesuviana | Following station |
|---|---|---|
| Boscoreale towards Napoli Porta Nolana | Naples-Poggiomarino line | Scafati towards Poggiomarino |
Location
- Location within Campania Location within Italy

Pompei Santuario is a railway station in Pompei, Metropolitan City of Naples, Italy. It is served by the Naples–Poggiomarino line of the Circumvesuviana commuter rail system.

== History ==
Originally, the station was simply named Pompei. Later, to avoid confusion with the Pompei Scavi-Villa dei Misteri station on the Torre Annunziata–Sorrento line, the name Santuario (meaning Shrine) was added, reflecting the station's proximity to the Shrine of the Virgin of the Rosary of Pompei.

== Station layout ==
The station building was reconstructed to replace the original, smaller structure, which was located nearby. It houses a ticket office and a waiting room. The station is staffed.

There are three through tracks used for passenger services, served by two platforms with canopies and connected by an underpass.

== See also ==
- List of railway stations in Campania
- Circumvesuviana
- Pompeii
