= Piano di Sorrento railway station =

Railway station in Piano di Sorrento, Naples, Italy

Piano di Sorrento
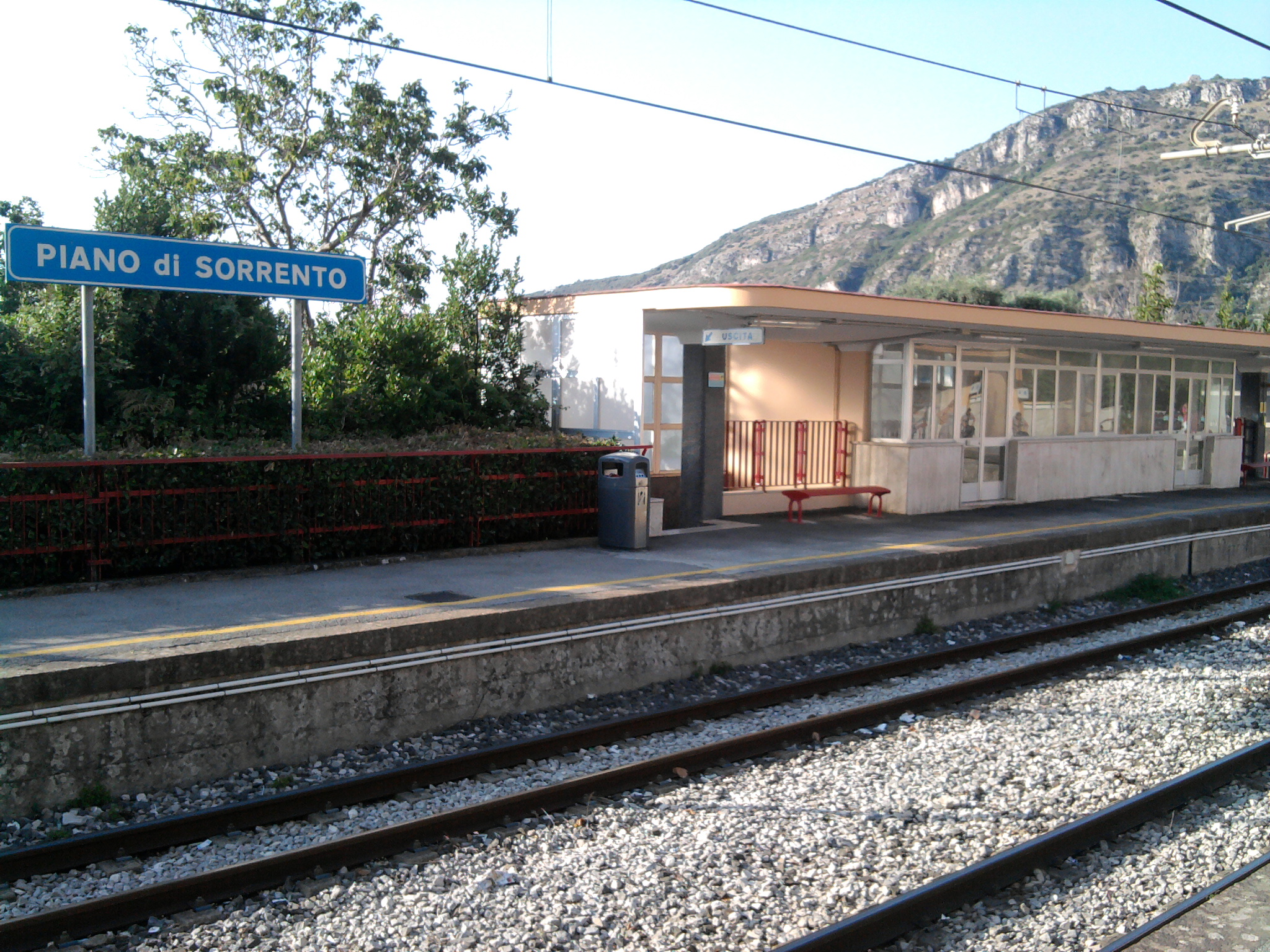

General information
- Location: Via della Stazione 4, Piano di Sorrento 80063 NA; Piano di Sorrento, Metropolitan City of Naples, Campania; Italy
- Coordinates: 40°38′06.05″N 14°24′37.29″E
- Line: Circumvesuviana Naples-Sorrento line
- Train operators: EAV

History
- Opened: 1948; 78 years ago

Services
Preceding station	Circumvesuviana	Following station
Meta towards Napoli Porta Nolana	Naples-Sorrento line	Sant'Agnello towards Sorrento
Location
- Location within Campania Location within Italy

Piano di Sorrento railway station is a railway station in Piano di Sorrento, Metropolitan City of Naples, Italy. It is served by the Naples-Sorrento line of Circumvesuviana railway network, managed by EAV.

== Station layout ==
Inaugurated in 1948, the station consists of two through tracks, served by platforms with canopies and connected by an underpass.

There is also a terminal track, rarely used by maintenance vehicles. The passenger building houses, on the lower level, the ticket office, a waiting room, restrooms, and a café.

== Connections ==
- Bus stop

== See also ==
- List of railway stations in Campania
