= Botteghelle railway station =

Railway station in Naples, Italy

Botteghelle
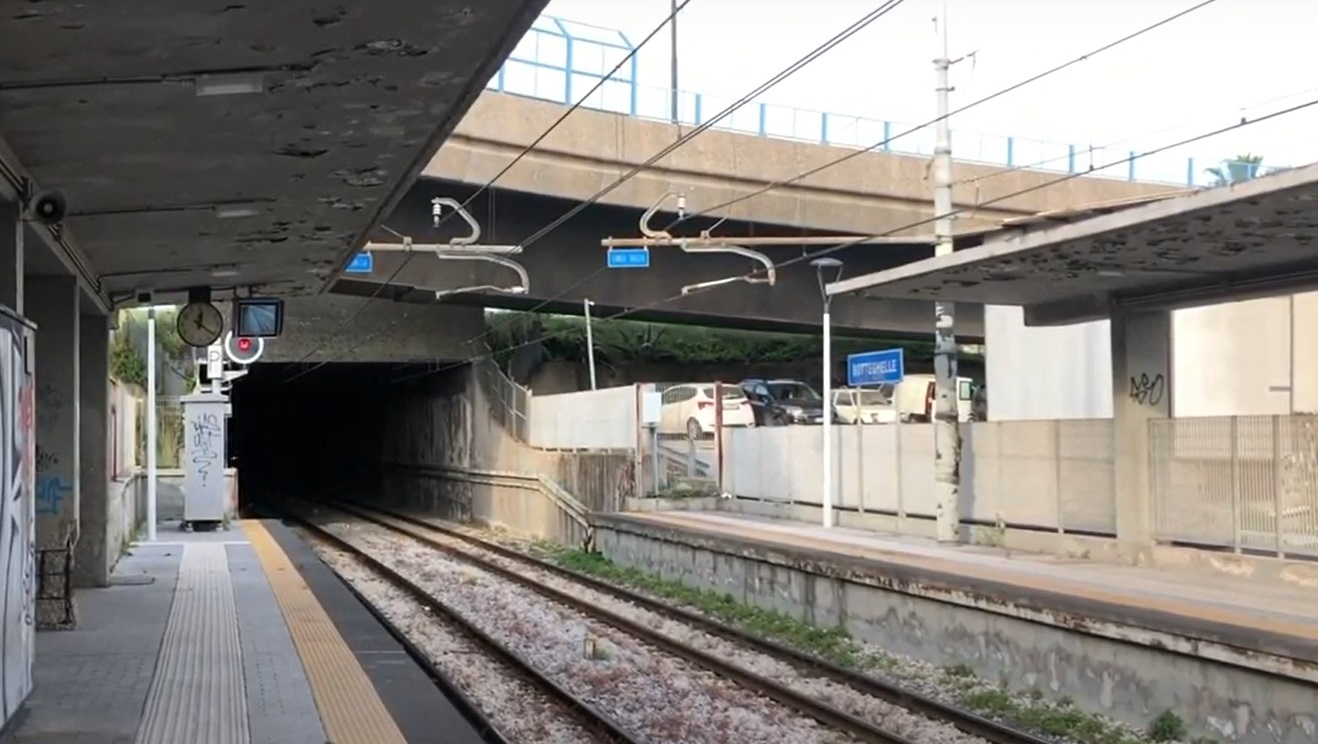

General information
- Location: Ponticelli, Naples, Campania; Italy
- Coordinates: 40°52′20.28″N 14°18′56.16″E
- Line: Circumvesuviana
- Train operators: EAV
- Connections: urban and suburban buses

Construction
- Structure type: Surface branch station

History
- Opened: 2 March 2003; 23 years ago

Services
Preceding station	Circumvesuviana	Following station
Poggioreale towards Napoli Porta Nolana	Naples-Baiano line	Madonnelle towards Baiano
Location
- Location within Campania Location within Italy

Botteghelle railway station is a railway station in Naples, Italy. It is served by the Naples-Baiano and Naples-San Giorgio lines of Circumvesuviana railway network, managed by EAV.

== History ==
The station was inaugurated on March 2, 2003, along with the new double-track alignment between Napoli Napoli Centro Direzionale and Casoria Arpino-Volla.

== Station layout ==
Opened along with the line in 2003, the station features a station building that houses a waiting room and a ticket office. It has two tracks, connected by a single platform. Access is provided either via an underpass or by using escalators.

== Connections ==
Trains stopping at the station include those bound for Naples, Baiano, Acerra, and San Giorgio a Cremano. Passenger traffic remains at moderate levels, primarily driven by commuter flows toward Naples.

- Bus stop

== See also ==
- History of rail transport in Italy
- List of railway stations in Naples
- List of railway stations in Campania
- Railway stations in Italy
