= Pompei railway station =

Railway station in Pompei, Italy

Pompei Scavi
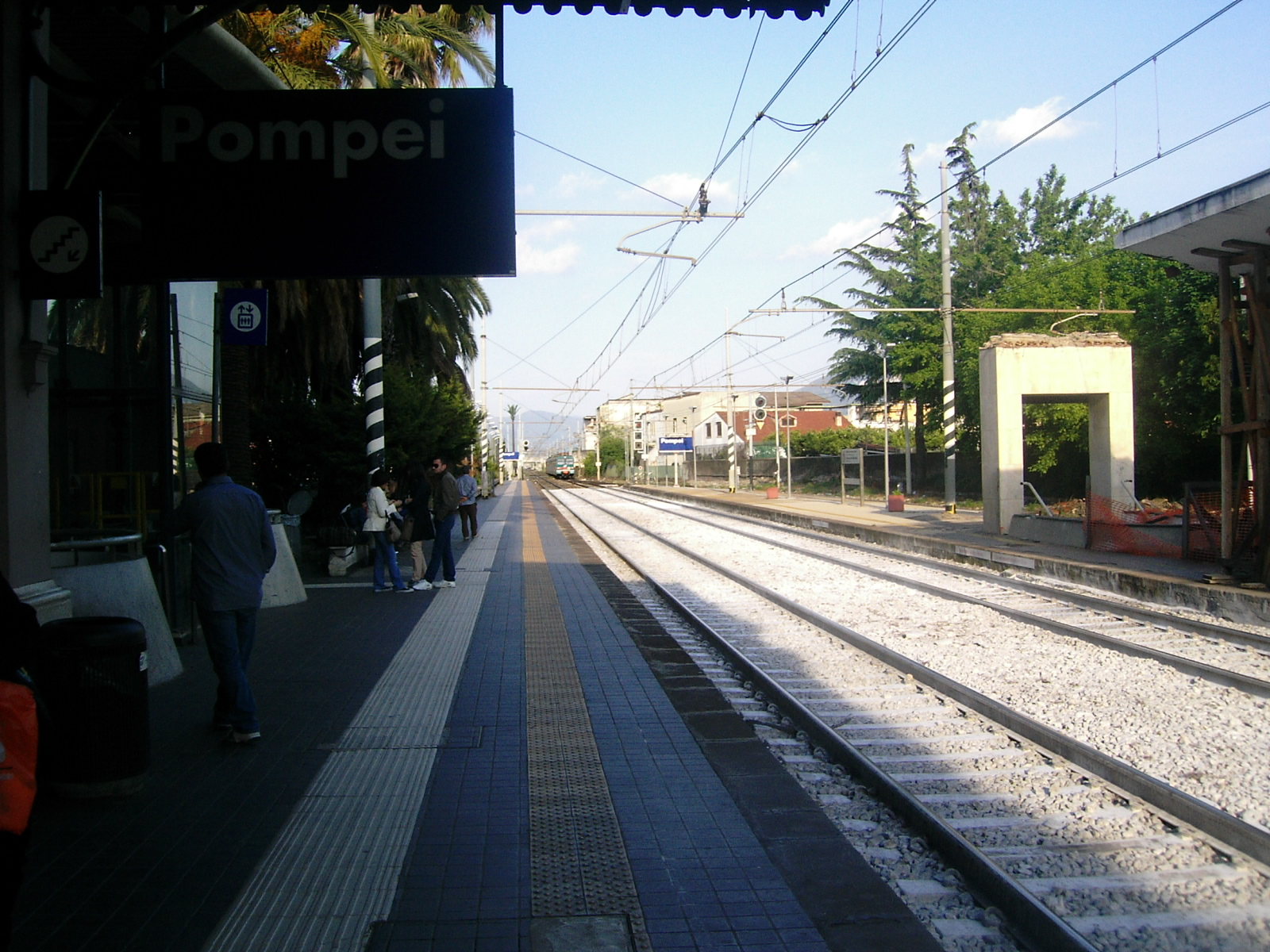
- Pompei railway station in 2008.

General information
- Location: Italy
- Coordinates: 40°44′45.24″N 14°30′04.68″E
- Operator: Rete Ferroviaria Italiana
- Line: Naples–Salerno
- Platforms: 2
- Connections: Pompei Scavi (Circumvesuviana)

History
- Opened: 1884
Location
- Location within Campania Location within Italy

Pompei railway station is a railway station in Pompei, Campania in Italy.

== See also ==
- History of rail transport in Italy
- List of railway stations in Campania
- Railway stations in Italy
