= Napoli Centro Direzionale railway station =

Railway station in Naples, Italy

Napoli Centro Direzionale
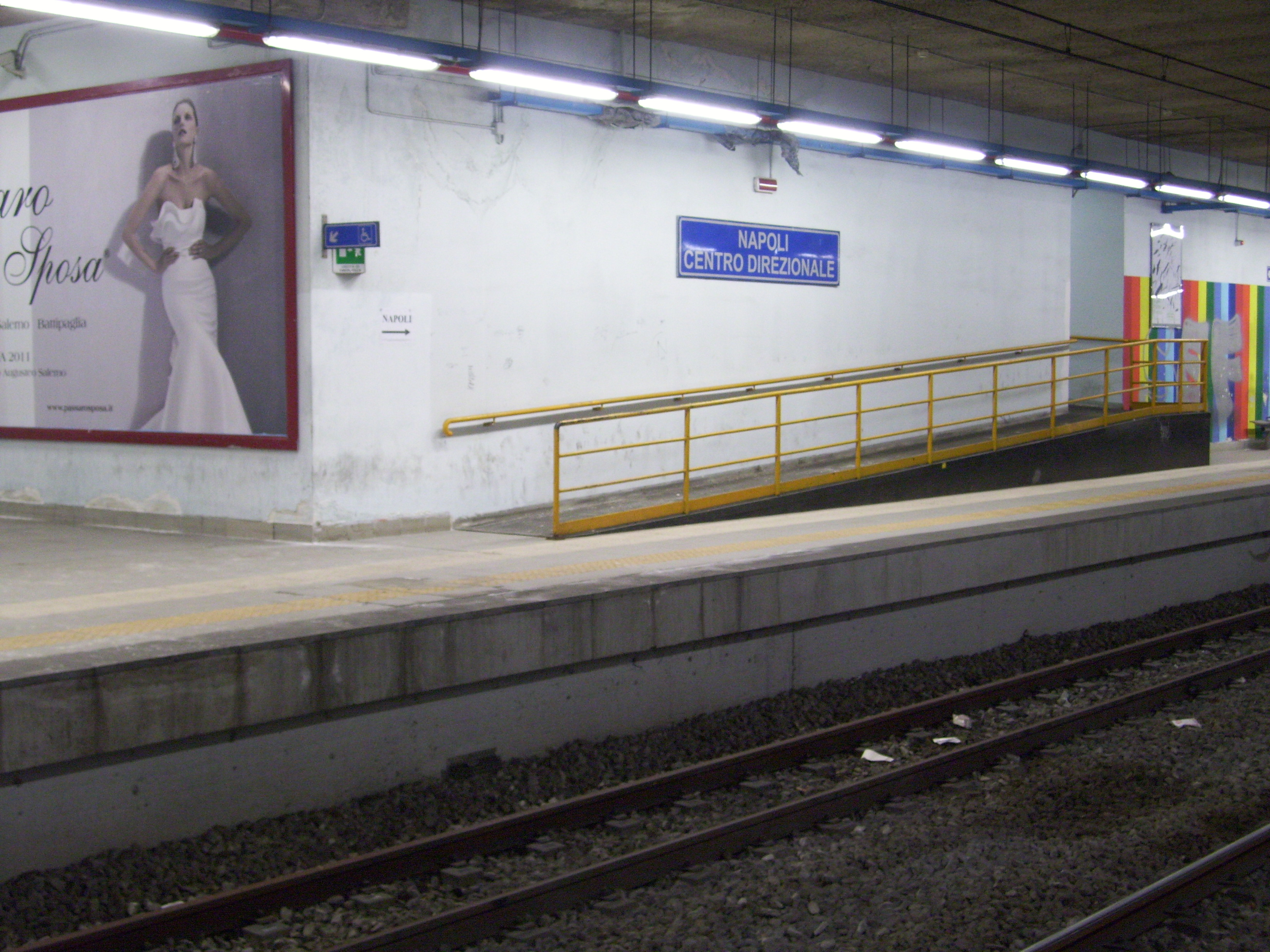

General information
- Location: Centro direzionale di Napoli, Naples, Campania; Italy
- Coordinates: 40°51′30.06″N 14°16′54.12″E
- Line: Circumvesuviana
- Train operators: EAV
- Connections: Naples Metro (Line 1 at Centro Direzionale)

History
- Opened: 2002; 24 years ago
- Closed: Temporarily closed in 2024

Services
Preceding station	Circumvesuviana	Following station
Napoli Garibaldi towards Napoli Porta Nolana	Naples-Sorrento line	Poggioreale towards Sorrento
Location
- Location within Campania Location within Italy

Napoli Centro Direzionale railway station is a railway station in Naples, Italy. It is served by the Naples-Baiano and Naples-San Giorgio lines of Circumvesuviana railway network, managed by EAV.

== Connections ==
- Metro stop (Centro Direzionale, Line 1)
- Bus stop

== See also ==
- History of rail transport in Italy
- List of railway stations in Naples
- List of railway stations in Campania
- Railway stations in Italy
