= Poggioreale railway station =

Railway station in Naples, Italy

Poggioreale
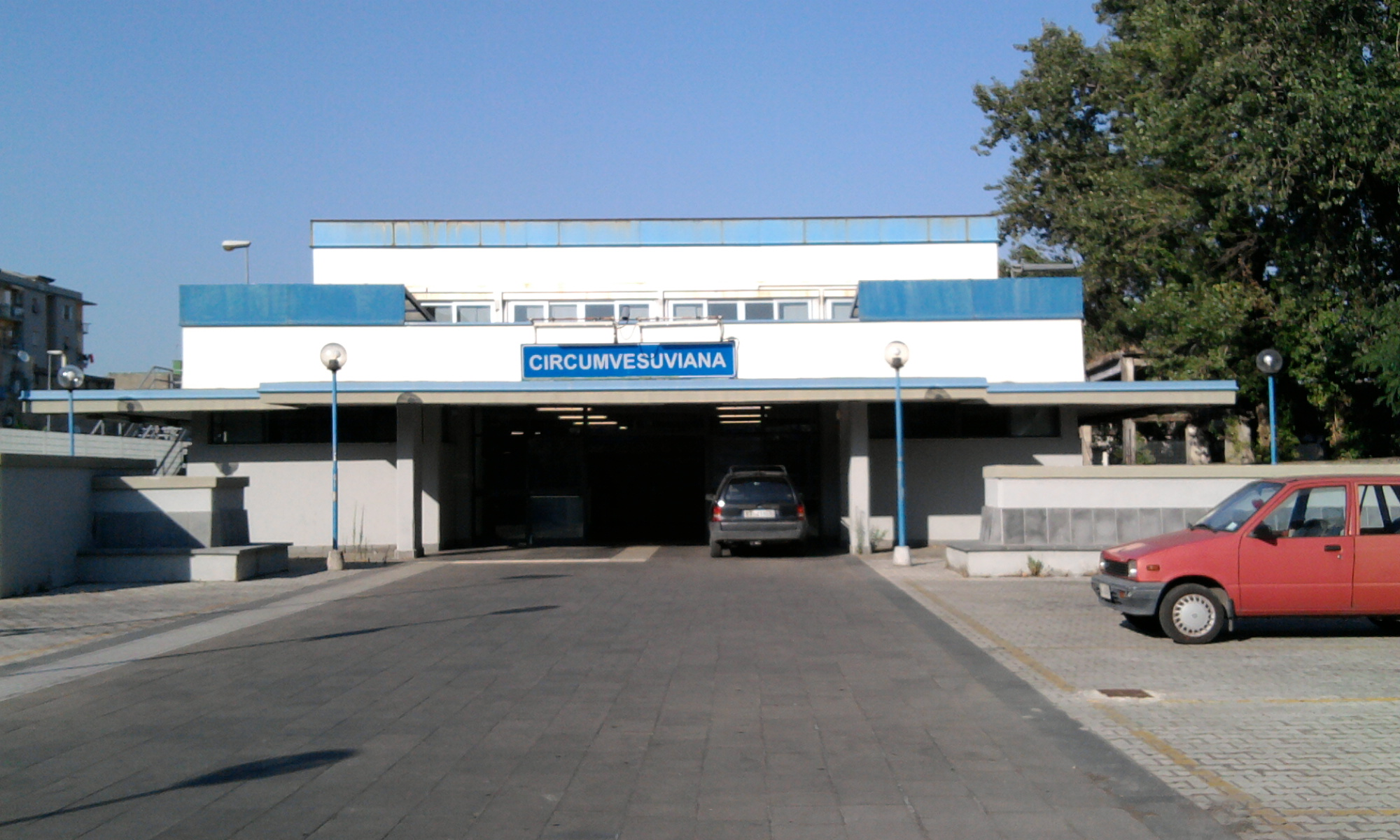

General information
- Location: Poggioreale, Naples, Campania; Italy
- Coordinates: 40°51′59.76″N 14°17′36.24″E
- Line: Circumvesuviana
- Tracks: 3
- Train operators: EAV
- Connections: Naples Metro (Line 1 at Poggioreale

History
- Opened: 2003; 23 years ago

Services
Preceding station	Circumvesuviana	Following station
Napoli Centro Direzionale towards Napoli Porta Nolana	Naples-Baiano line	Botteghelle towards Baiano
Location
- Location within Campania Location within Italy

Poggioreale railway station is a railway station in Naples, Italy. It is served by the Naples-Baiano and Naples-San Giorgio lines of Circumvesuviana railway network, managed by EAV.

== History ==
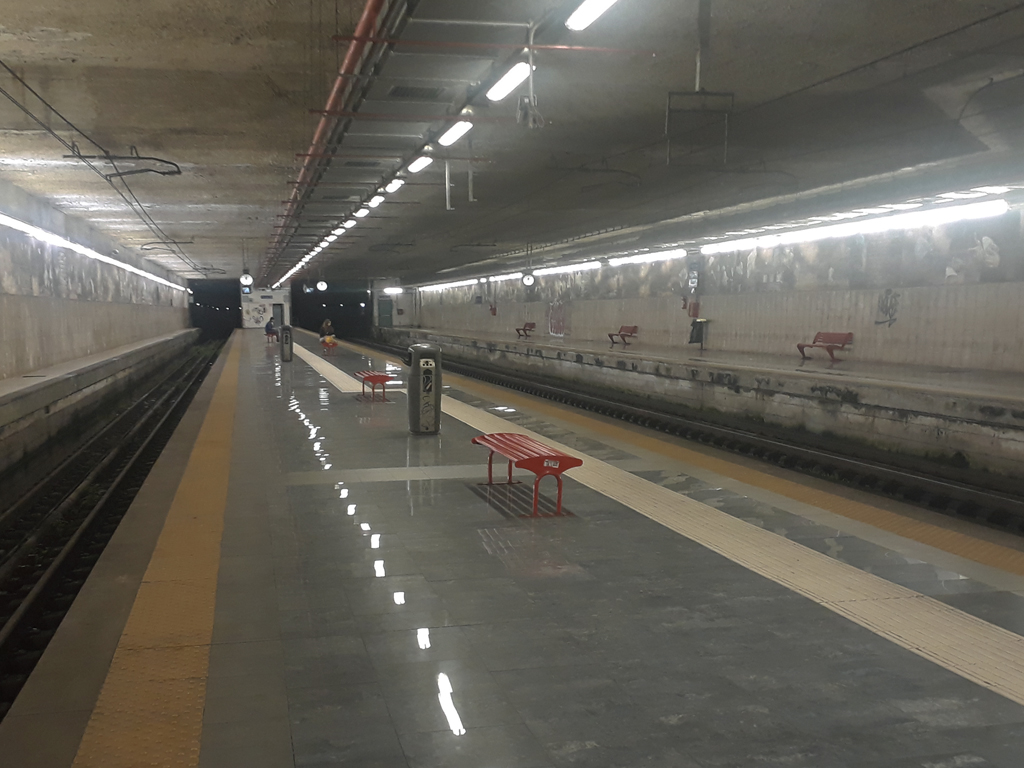
The platform.

The Poggioreale station was inaugurated with the opening of the line Naples-San Giorgio, serving the Cemetery of Poggioreale. On March 2, 2003, with the activation of the new double-track line, which was partially underground and built on a new alignment, the station was replaced by a new underground facility.

== Connections ==
- Metro stop (Poggioreale, Line 1)
- Bus stop

== See also ==
- History of rail transport in Italy
- List of railway stations in Naples
- List of railway stations in Campania
- Railway stations in Italy
