= Pompei =

City in Campania, southern Italy

Pompei Pumpeje (Neapolitan)
- Comune
- Città di Pompei
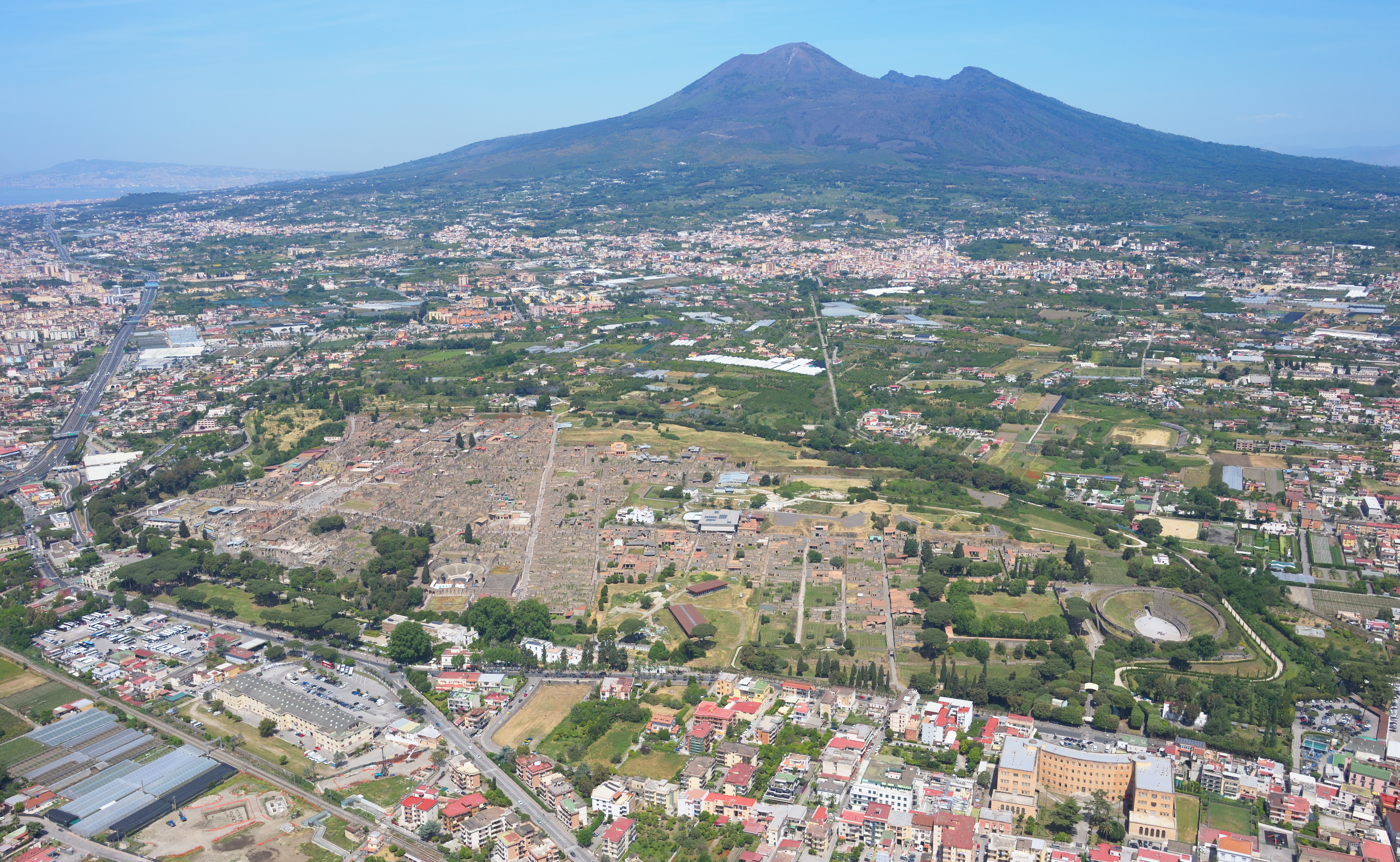

- Flag Coat of arms

- Location within Italy Location within Campania
- Coordinates: 40°44′57″N 14°30′02″E
- Country: Italy
- Region: Campania
- Metropolitan city: Naples (NA)
- Frazioni: Mariconda, Messigno, Ponte Nuovo, Treponti, Fontanelle, Parrelle, Ponte Izzo, Ponte Persica, Fossavalle, Chiesa della Giuliana

Government
  - Mayor: Carmine Lo Sapio

Area
  - Total: 12.42 km^{2} (4.80 sq mi)
- Elevation: 14 m (46 ft)

Population (2025)
  - Total: 23,612
  - Density: 1,901/km^{2} (4,924/sq mi)
- Demonym: Pompeiani
- Time zone: UTC+1 (CET)
  - Summer (DST): UTC+2 (CEST)
- Postal code: 80045, 80040
- Dialing code: 081
- Patron saint: Beata Vergine del Rosario
- Saint day: 8 May
- Website: Official website

Pompei (Italian: Pompei [pomˈpɛi]; Neapolitan: Pumpeje [pumˈbɛːjə]), also known in English as Pompeii (/pɒmˈpeɪ(i)/ pom-PAY(-ee)) after the name of the ancient city, is a city and municipality in the Metropolitan City of Naples, in the region of Campania in Italy. It has a population of 23,612.

It contains the ancient Roman ruins of Pompeii, a UNESCO World Heritage Site.

== History ==
Modern Pompei was founded in 1881 after the building of the Shrine of Our Lady of Pompei by the lawyer Bartolo Longo.

== Geography ==
The town of Pompei is located at the eastern borders of its province, and its urban area is contiguous with Scafati in the Province of Salerno. It also borders Torre Annunziata, Castellammare di Stabia, Boscoreale, Santa Maria la Carità and Sant'Antonio Abate.

== Demographics ==
As of 2025, Pompei has a population of 23,612, of whom 47.9% are male and 52.1% are female. Minors make up 16.8% of the population, and seniors make up 22.1%, compared to the Italian average of 14.9% and 24.7% respectively.

Historical population

Year	Pop.	±%
1861	5,615	—
1871	5,753	+2.5%
1881	6,267	+8.9%
1901	7,342	+17.2%
1911	7,684	+4.7%
1921	8,382	+9.1%
1931	10,054	+19.9%
1936	11,792	+17.3%

Year	Pop.	±%
1951	15,035	+27.5%
1961	20,366	+35.5%
1971	21,547	+5.8%
1981	22,934	+6.4%
1991	25,177	+9.8%
2001	25,751	+2.3%
2011	25,440	−1.2%
2021	24,098	−5.3%

Source: ISTAT

== Landmarks ==
=== Ruins of Pompeii ===
Modern Pompei is famous primarily for the ruins of the ancient city of Pompeii, located in the zone of Pompei Scavi. The vast archaeological area is a UNESCO World Heritage Site and attracts many international tourists.

=== Shrine of Our Lady of Pompei ===
The Shrine of Our Lady of Pompei, dedicated to Our Lady of the Rosary, has become a site for Catholic pilgrimages in recent years. It houses a canvas by Luca Giordano. It was founded by a convert who reportedly experienced a miracle from the Virgin Mary. Miracles have been reported since its foundation. The ex-votos that cover the church walls are a testimonial of the miracles granted by the Virgin Mary since the church was consecrated in 1891. Many churches, chapels, and shrines worldwide are dedicated to Our Lady of Pompei.

=== Bell tower ===
The bell tower was built between 1912 and 1925. Designed by Aristide Leonori and his brother Pio Leonori, it is 80 metres high (260 ft). The top of the bell tower, which can be reached by taking a lift, offers a panoramic view of the modern city, Mount Vesuvius and part of the ancient city of Pompeii.

=== Sacred architecture ===
- Shrine of Our Lady of Pompei
- Church of San Salvatore
- Church of Sacro Cuore di Gesù
- Church of San Giuseppe sposo della Beata Vergine
- Church of Santa Maria Assunta in Cielo
- Church of Immacolata Concezione
- Church of Madonna dell'Arco
- Chapel of Madonna delle Grazie
- Church of Sacri Cuori di Gesù e Maria

== Transport ==
=== Roads ===
Pompei is served by the motorway A3 at the exits of Pompei–Scafati, Pompei Ovest (close to the ruins of Villa of the Mysteries) and Castellammare di Stabia. It is crossed by the national roads SS 18 and SS 145.

=== Railways ===
Trains on the FS-owned Naples–Salerno railway stop at the Pompei railway station. Pompei has four stations on two lines of the Circumvesuviana network. The Pompei Santuario (located in the middle of the town) and Pompei Valle (near the ruins of Pompeii) lie on the Torre Annunziata–Pompei–Poggiomarino line. Pompei Scavi-Villa dei Misteri, which serves the Villa of the Mysteries, and Moregine lie on the Naples–Torre Annunziata–Castellammare–Sorrento line.

=== Airports ===
The nearest airports are:

- Napoli-Capodichino (NAP) 28 km
- Salerno-Pontecagnano (QSR) 49 km

== Sport ==
Pompei's main football team is Pompei FC

== Notable people ==
- Agostino Abbagnale (born 1966), rower
- Pino D'Angiò (1952–2024), disco artist
- Felice Evacuo (born 1982), footballer
- Bartolo Longo (1841–1926), catholic saint
- Gilda Sansone (born 1989), fashion model
- Alberto Savino (born 1973), footballer
- Giovanni Serrapica (born 1981), footballer
- Vincenzo Sicignano (born 1974), footballer
- Gaetano Vastola (born 1978), footballer
- Valentina Nappi (born 1990), adult film actress

== Twin towns and sister cities ==
- Gyeongju, South Korea
- Latiano, Italy
- Noto, Italy
- Tarragona, Spain
- Xi'an, China

== Gallery ==
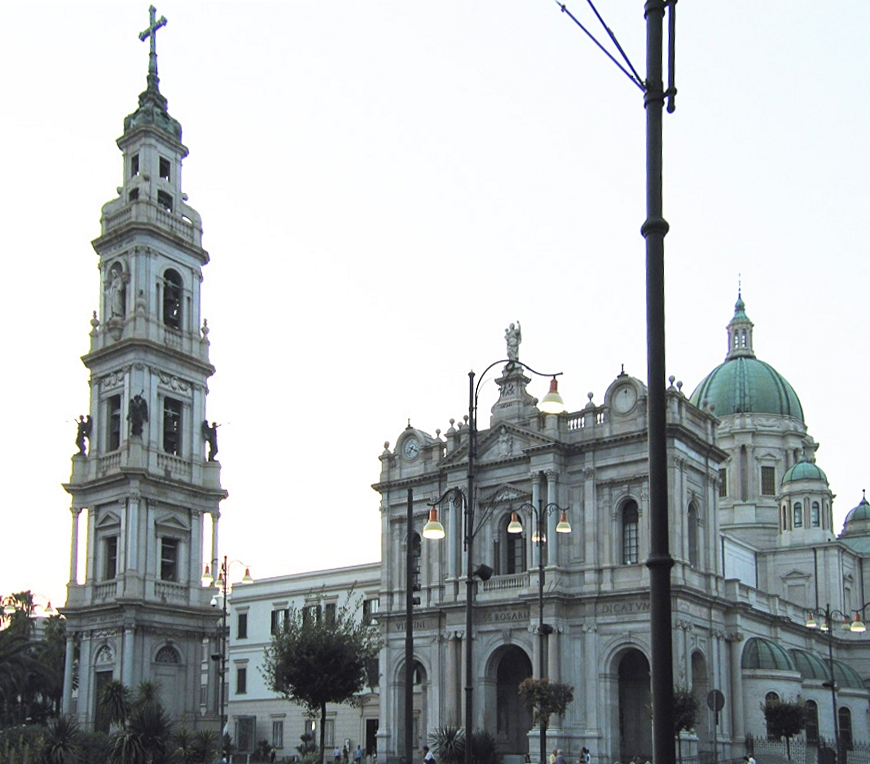
Sanctuary of Pompei

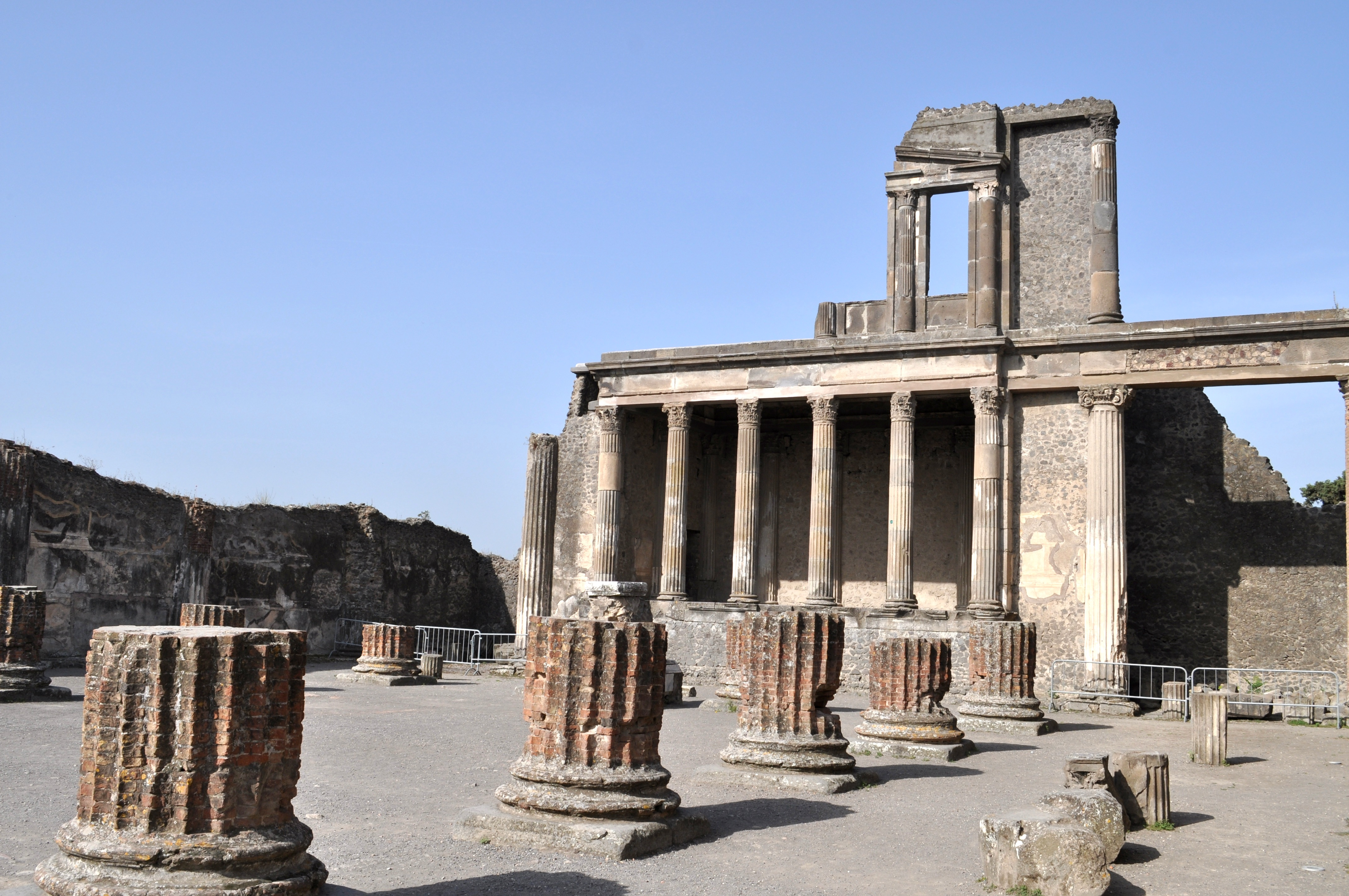
The Roman ruins of Pompeii

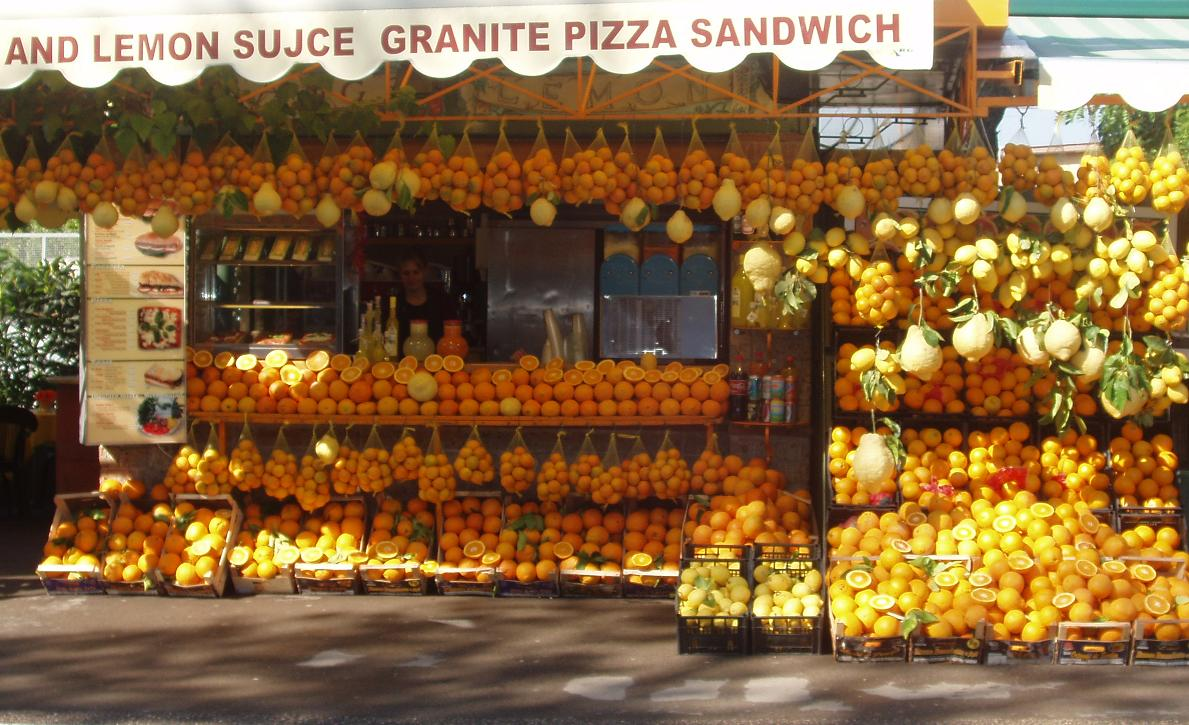
A citrus store on a central road

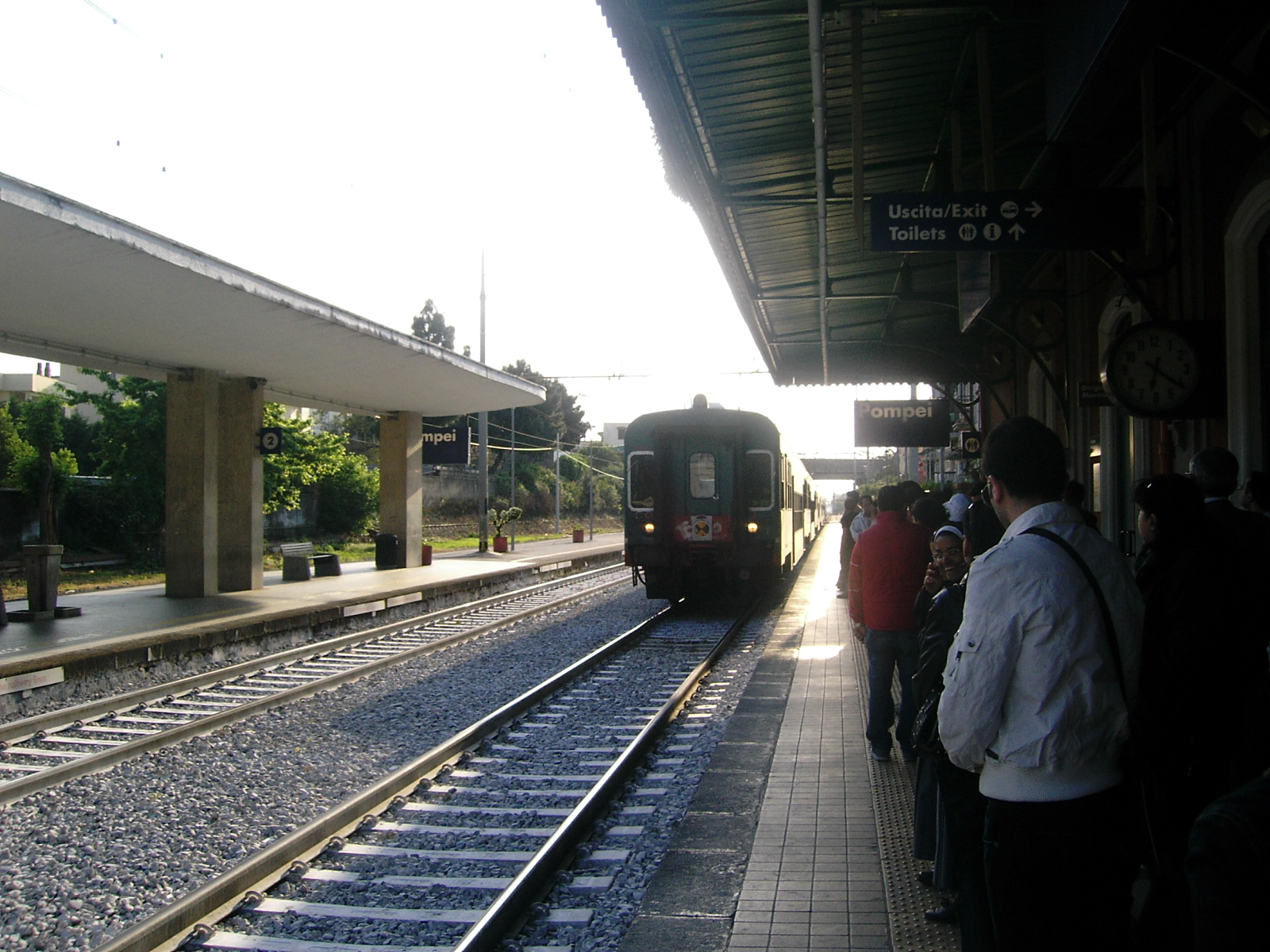
The FS railway station
