= Circumvesuviana derailment =

2010 railway accident in Naples, Italy

The Circumvesuviana Derailment was a railway accident which occurred on Friday 6 August 2010 in Naples, Italy. A train of the Circumvesuviana line, a local railway providing transport in the area around the Mount Vesuvius, derailed between the San Giorgio a Cremano and Naples stations.

The accident led to a single fatality, seventy-one-year-old Giuseppe Marotta, who lost his legs in the wreck and died shortly after arriving at Loreto Mare hospital. Among the fifty-eight injured, a twenty-five-year-old man entered a coma, and a woman had to be treated for severe wounds of the thorax and head. Eleven other people had severe wounds and had to be hospitalized.

== Derailment ==
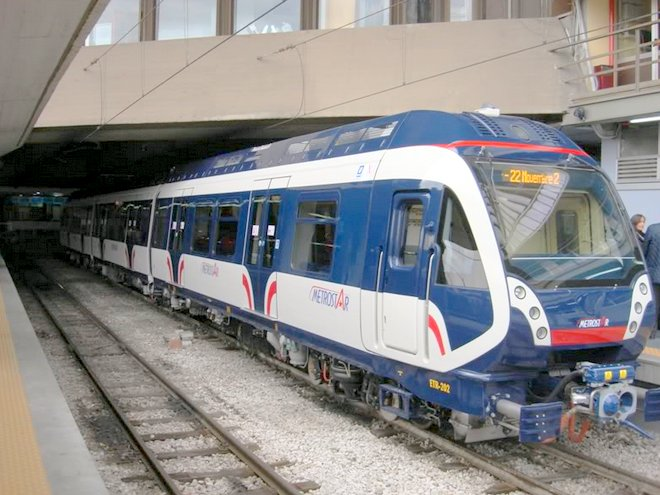
An ETR 200 Metrostar

The train was traveling on a junction shared between the Circumvesuviana service and a Naples subway route from San Giorgio a Cremano to Naples. The rolling stock involved was an ETR 200 Metrostar, one of the latest acquisitions from the Circumvesuviana administration, just one year old and with a perfect maintenance record.

At 11:10, after leaving the Centro Direzionale station, the train left the rails and hit a wall at the rail-side. The three permanently joined passenger-cars overturned, and the engine hit an electricity pole. The first car was crushed under the second one. First aid was provided by workers from a nearby factory to a man with crushed legs: they used their belts to stop blood loss, but the man died shortly after being transported to the nearest hospital. Medics of Loreto Mare hospital were on strike (due to salary conditions), but suspended the protest to provide first aid to the injured passengers.

While people promptly called the 118 medical emergency number, response from ambulances was slow, taking more than twenty minutes to bring the fifteen ambulances required to transport the injured from the disaster scene. Twenty technician and three cranes from Protezione Civile later joined the rescue operations.

== Causes ==
The main cause of the accident was excessive speed. Apparently the train was travelling at twice the maximum allowed speed, in a section where the speed limit was just 20 km/h. The train driver, Giancarlo Naso, said he did not remember anything from the moments before the accident, and appeared confused to the police officers who eventually got him into custody. He was an experienced driver, with twenty years experience on the line. One witness, a nineteen-year-old passenger named Patrizio Straiano, said the driver was talking on his mobile phone shortly before the crash, and he could have missed the speed limit signal. The driver had fled the scene of the accident after the train derailed.

Maintenance work to provide structural reinforcement to the side walls had been completed three days before the accident, but allegations that the line had structural problems and reports of anomalies were dismissed. Although the train was equipped with an automatic speed control system, the required rail components were not installed.

Local newspapers blamed the accident on cost cutting and bad maintenance by Circumvesuviana, and on the privatization of local mass-transport services.

== Aftermath ==
The derailment caused severe damage to the railway infrastructure. Local service was provided using buses for a number of weeks afterwards.

== Other incidents ==
Circumvesuviana had been involved in two previous accidents. On 6 December 1992 a switch malfunction, instigated by bad weather, caused a derailment.

On 22 January 2009 a tree toppled by the wind hit the overhead electric wires and fell onto a train passing below. The train driver and guard were severely injured, but ultimately recovered.
