= Gianturco =

Gianturco (pronounced [dʒanˈturko]) is an Italian surname. Notable people with the surname include:

- Cesare Gianturco (1905–1995), Italian-American physician
- Emanuele Gianturco (1857–1907), Italian legal scholar and politician
- Paola Gianturco (born 1939), American photojournalist and businessperson

== See also ==
- Leonida Gianturco, pseudonym of Italian man of letters and anti-fascist Leone Ginzburg (1909–1944)
