= Torre Annunziata Oplonti railway station =

Railway station in Torre Annunziata, Italy

Torre Annunziata Oplonti
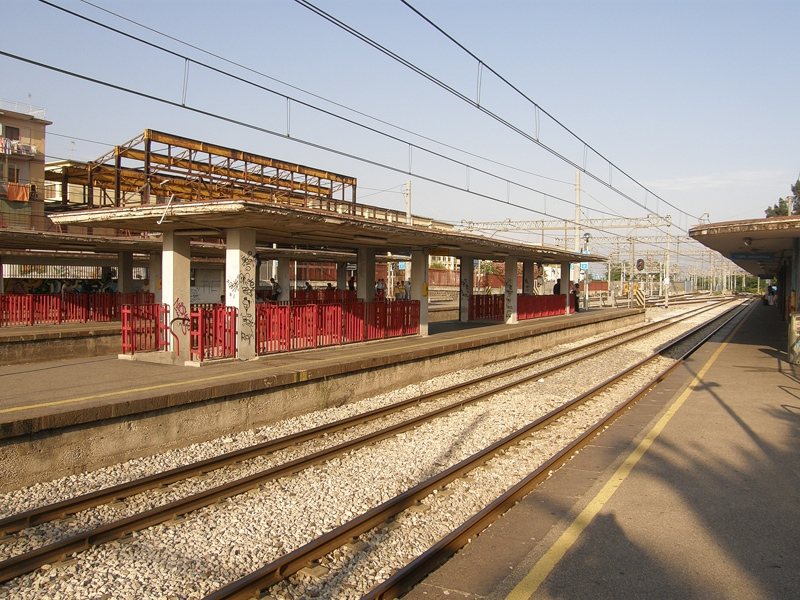
- Platform

General information
- Location: Via P. Boselli 10; Torre Annunziata, NA 80058
- Coordinates: 40°45′34.92″N 14°27′05.4″E
- System: Circumvesuviana commuter rail station
- Line: Naples-Sorrento line
- Tracks: 6

Construction
- Accessible: yes

History
- Opened: 1904; 122 years ago

Services
Preceding station	Circumvesuviana	Following station
T9rre del Greco towards Napoli Porta Nolana	Naples-Sorrento line	Villa Regina–Antiquarium towards Sorrento
Location
- Location within Campania Location within Italy

Torre Annunziata–Oplonti is a railway station in Torre Annunziata, Metropolitan City of Naples, Italy. It is served by the Naples–Sorrento line of the Circumvesuviana commuter rail system.

== History ==
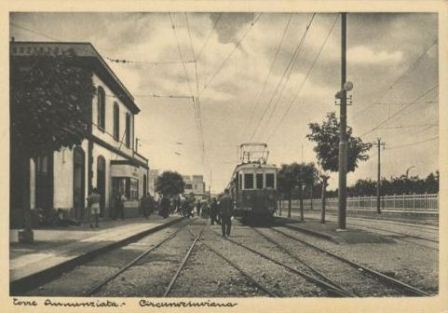
The station as seen in an old postcard.

At the time of its inauguration, the station was simply named Torre Annunziata. In 1934, with the opening of the branch line to Castellammare di Stabia, the station began serving the important role—still maintained today—of junction between the two lines. It was during this period, in anticipation of the line's extension to Sorrento, that the track yard was expanded. On 6 January 1948, the double-tracking of the line between Ercolano and Torre Annunziata came into operation. In the same year, as part of the aforementioned works, the new station building was inaugurated.

During the 1970s, further modernisation took place, including the raising of the platforms.

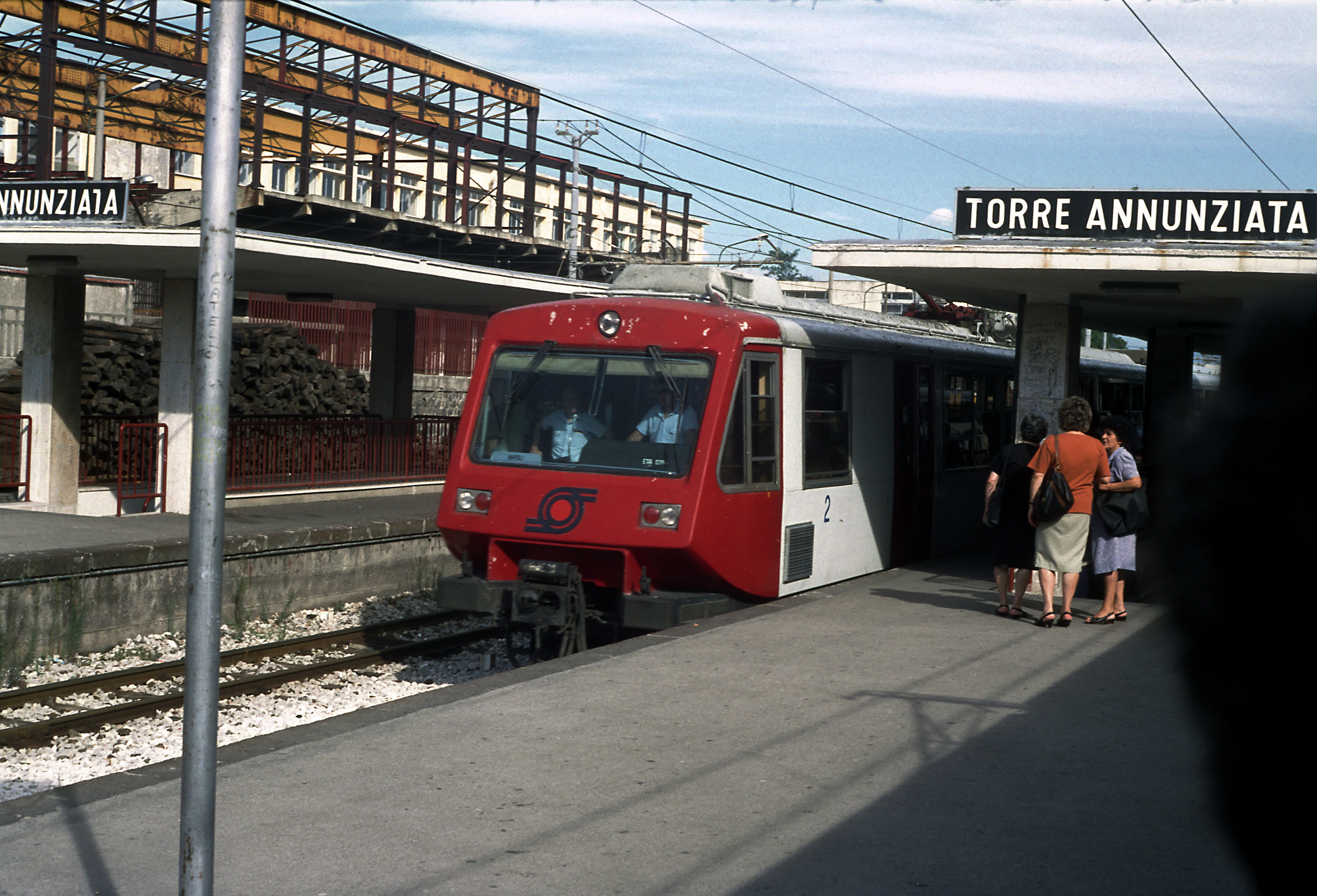
The station in September 1991.

In the 1990s, track renewal works were carried out, including the replacement of bridges over the A3 motorway and the double-tracking of the section between Torre Annunziata and Pompei Scavi. During this period, the station was renamed Torre Annunziata Oplonti-Villa di Poppea, in reference to its proximity to the Oplontis archaeological site.

== Station layout ==
The station building provides basic services such as a ticket office and a waiting room. The station comprises six through tracks, all equipped with platforms covered by masonry canopies and connected via an underpass. Only five of the tracks are regularly used for passenger services, while the sixth is typically reserved for storing maintenance vehicles. The station does not have a freight terminal and also houses an electrical substation.

== Passenger movement ==
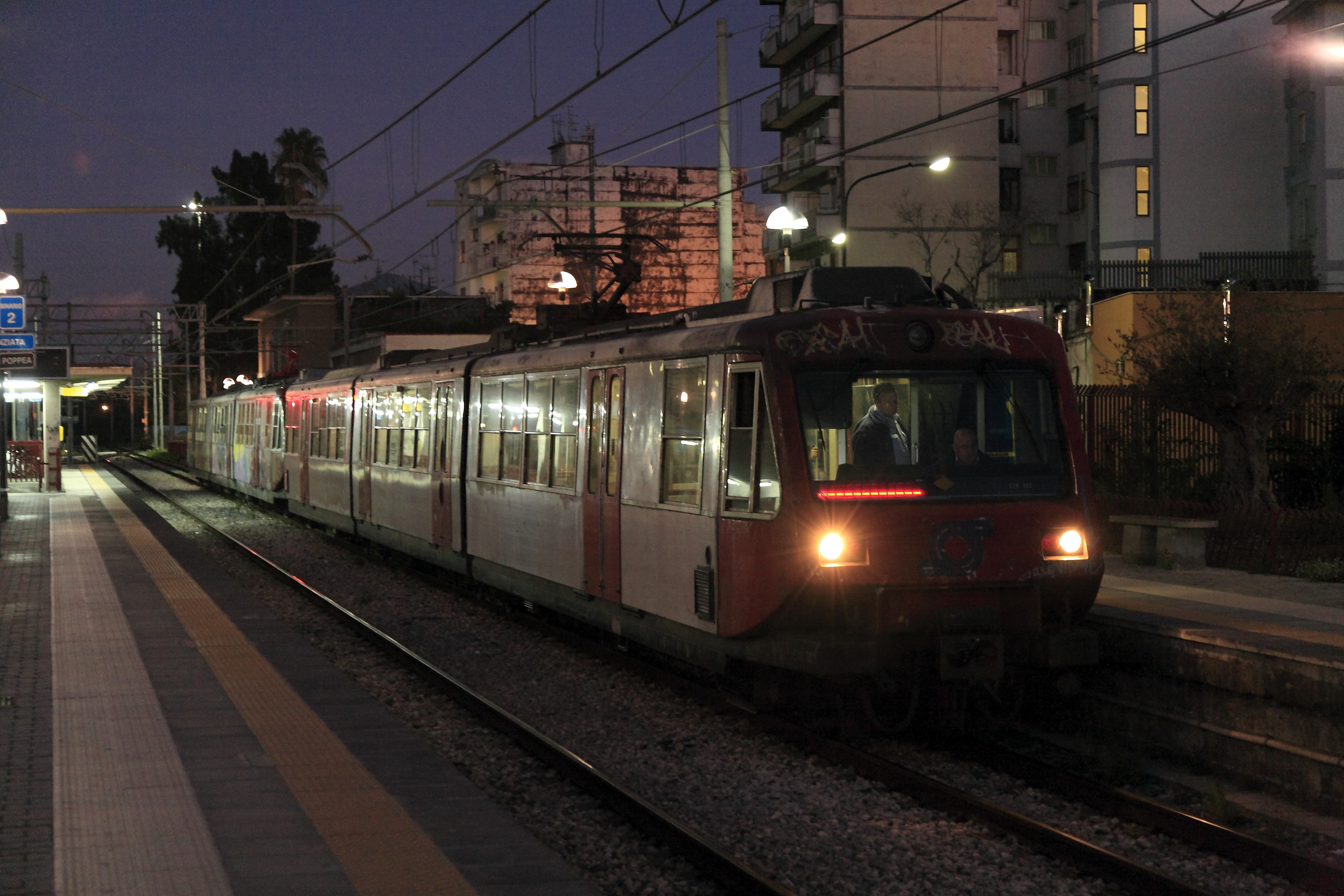
Train at a standstill on track 1 in the early 2010s.

The station experiences a high volume of passenger traffic throughout the day and is one of the busiest along the line, due to its strategic location at the junction between Poggiomarino and Sorrento. All categories of trains stop here: direttissimi bound for Napoli Porta Nolana arrive on track 1, while direttissimi to Sorrento use track 2; accelerati heading to Napoli Porta Nolana stop or depart from track 3, while track 4 is used by accelerati to Poggiomarino. Track 5 is used by some accelerati to or from Napoli Porta Nolana that terminate or originate at this station.

== See also ==
- List of railway stations in Campania
- Circumvesuviana
