= Gilda Sansone =

Italian model

- Born: April 12, 1989 (age 37); Pompei, Campania, Italy
- Modeling information
- Height: 1.77 m (5 ft 10 in)
- Hair color: Brown
- Eye color: Brown (EU) 87-62-93
- Agency: ICE Models Milan, Glamour Model Management Rome, A1 Management Athens

Gilda Sansone (born April 12, 1989 in Pompei, Campania, Italy) is an Italian fashion model and winner of the first cycle of Italia's Next Top Model.

== Early life ==
In a casting interview for Italia's Next Top Model, Sansone stated that, as a child, she was charmed by the models on the billboards and hoped to be one of them one day. To achieve her goal, in her early teen-age years, Sansone took part in beauty pageants and eventually won the title of Miss Ondina Sport in 2005. After her win on Italia's Next Top Model, Sansone went back to school to graduate in Social Studies.

== Italia's Next Top Model ==
Sansone soon appeared as the front-runner in the show thanks to her beauty and fresh look. However, since the beginning, the judging panel constantly warned her to tone down her sexiness in her shots and particularly in her walk in order to be more versatile. By the middle of the competition a determined Sansone started to improve and she developed into a more refined model, thus gaining a spot in the final runway. The judges were convinced by her final performances and her freshness, and they proclaimed her the first Italia's Next Top Model.

== Career ==
=== Print work ===
After her win, Sansone appeared on the April 2008 issue of Italian Elle and was featured in the Lavazza Espresso Experience 2009 Calendar, working along with Italian top model Eva Riccobono and renowned photographer Annie Leibovitz. Since then she has been modeling in campaigns, catalogues and photo shoots for Extyn, bWei, Faith Connexion by Vigor, Madame Figaro Cyprus January 2009 issue, the 2009 Calendar of Naples Soccer Team, Euforia, Tiffi, Tuwe Italia, Cerella CHD, Fashion Victim Beachwear, Navigare Beachwear, Extasy, Giorgia&Johns, Artigli, Ilaria Vitagliano luxury beachwear, Il Gabbiano beachwear, Invito Haute Couture, Masterpelle, Niclò, Kisha, Boccadamo Jewels, Capri Sposa, Nexos Jeans, Gota Blanca Beachwear, TADS Fashion School, Ipai Pleasure by Renato Balestra, Agogoa beachwear, Armata di Mare beachwear, Yes London, Zuiki, Cliché Jewellery, Pudika, Aké, Renato Balestra shoes, T+Art Fashion, BySimon Jewels, JustR, I Ragazzi del Rosso, Roberta Biagi, Sherì, Giorgia&Johns, Mivite, Jean Cryò, Bianca Brandi, KQuattro.

=== Runway ===
Sansone walked in different runway shows at Athens fashion week, among which were the S/S 2009 collections of Aslanis, Demna Gvasalia, Frida Karadima, Katerina Alexandraki, Kathy Heyndels, Victoria Kyriakides, Vrettos Vrettakos, Yiannos Xenis and Custo Barcelona. She subsequently walked in Cyprus Fashion week for the S/S 09 collections of Ocean Blue, Andreas Georgiou, Calia Monoyiou, Marios Messios, Elena Georgiou, Sofia Alexander, Christoforos Kotentos, Fotini Lamnissos, Notis Panayiotou, Stalo Theodorou. She also did lingerie fashion shows in Tunisia. Sansone is a recurring runway model at Tuttosposi, bridal fashion week of Naples, where she walks for high fashion designers among which are Bruno Caruso, Angela Solla, Gianni Molaro and others. She participates in the Sfilata d'Amore e Moda, walking for swimsuits and high fashion collections. Sansone has also often graced the runways of Alta Roma Alta Moda, the Italian high fashion week in Rome, where she walked for Nino Lettieri.

Preceded by None	Italia's Next Top Model winner Cycle 1	Succeeded by Michela Maggioni
