= Pompei Scavi–Villa dei Misteri railway station =

Railway station in Pompei, Italy

Pompei Scavi Villa dei Misteri
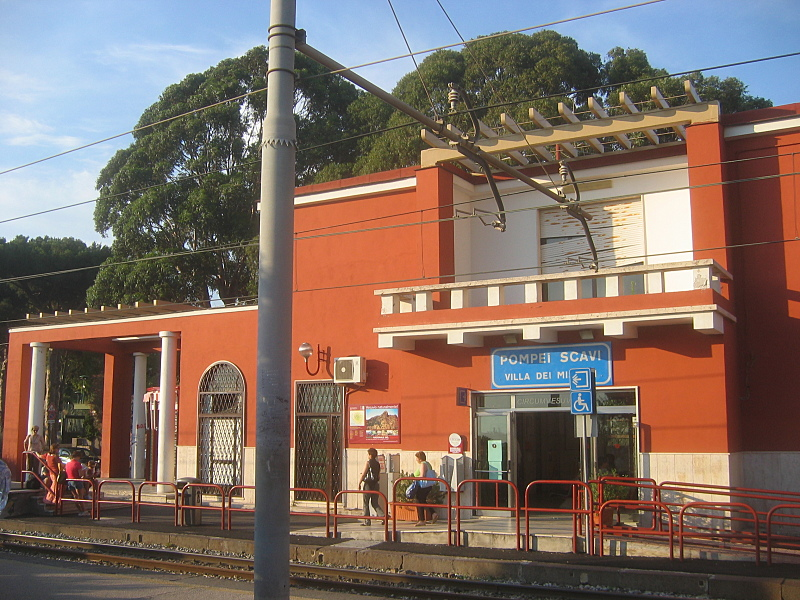
- Pompei Scavi station building

General information
- Location: 1 Via Villa dei Misteri; Pompei, NA 80045
- Coordinates: 40°44′55″N 14°28′52″E
- System: Circumvesuviana commuter rail station
- Line: Naples-Sorrento line
- Platforms: 2 side platforms
- Tracks: 2

Construction
- Accessible: yes

History
- Opened: 1932; 94 years ago

Services
| Preceding station | Circumvesuviana | Following station |
|---|---|---|
| Villa Regina–Antiquarium towards Napoli Porta Nolana | Naples-Sorrento line | Moregine towards Sorrento |
Location
- Location within Campania Location within Italy

Pompei Scavi–Villa dei Misteri is a railway station in Pompei, Metropolitan City of Naples, Italy. It is served by the Naples–Sorrento line of the Circumvesuviana commuter rail system.

== Location ==
Pompei Scavi is the closest station to the famous ruins of the Ancient Roman city of Pompeii, with the ruins across the street from the main station building.

== Station layout ==
Pompei Scavi station consists of two tracks with two side platforms; platform 1 serves trains to Sorrento while platform 2 serves trains to Naples.

== See also ==
- List of railway stations in Campania
- Circumvesuviana
- Pompeii
- Villa of the Mysteries
