= Paola Gianturco =

American journalist

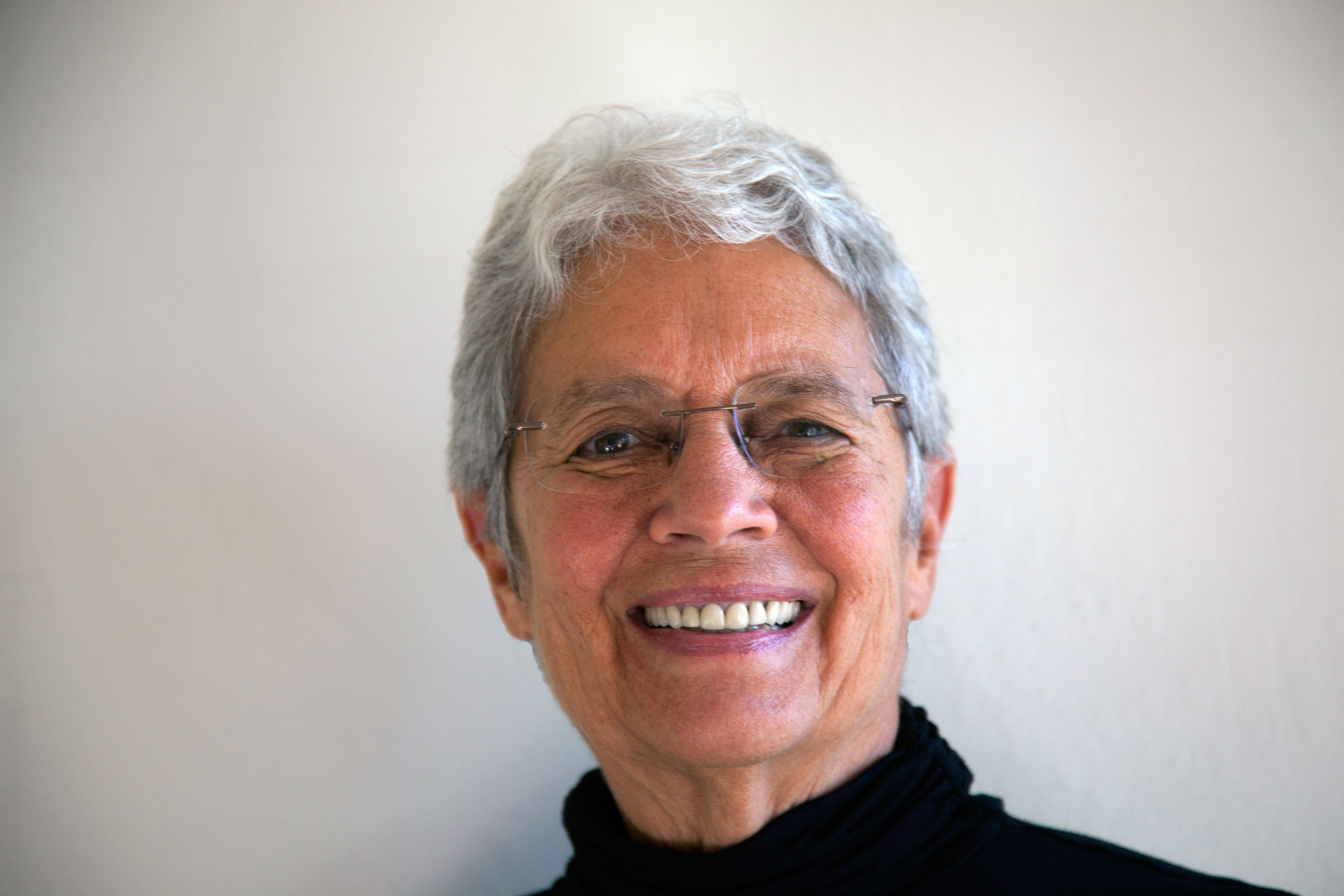
- Born: 1939 (age 86–87); Urbana, Illinois
- Education: Stanford University
- Occupation: Photojournalist
- Years active: 1995–current
- Website: paolagianturcoauthor.com

Paola Gianturco (born 1939) is an American photojournalist and former business executive. Her photojournalistic work has focused on women around the world who have overcome difficult issues.

== Background ==
=== Early life ===
Gianturco was born and raised in Urbana, Illinois. When she was 8 years old, she received her first camera, a gift from her father. She graduated from Stanford University in 1961.

=== Marketing and communications ===
Before becoming a photojournalist in the mid-1990s, Gianturco spent 34 years working in marketing and corporate communications. She worked at Hall & Levine, the first women-owned advertising agency, where she became a principal; and spent nine years as executive vice president of the corporate communications subsidiary of Saatchi & Saatchi.

== Photojournalism ==
=== Entry into photojournalism ===
In 1995, Gianturco was living near San Francisco, working as a communications consultant. The United Nations’ Fourth World Conference on Women in Beijing inspired her to document craftswomen in developing countries, and she invited former co-worker Toby Tuttle to collaborate in photographing and writing a book. At the time, the two were both amateur photographers and longtime folk art collectors. They spent three years researching the subject, and two more interviewing and photographing 90 craftswomen in 12 developing countries on 4 continents. They spent at least a week in each of the 28 villages they visited.

In Her Hands: Craftswomen Changing the World was published in 2000, with a foreword by Alice Walker. The book includes 260 color photographs. Gianturco and Tuttle wrote the book with the intention of bringing publicity to the craftswomen, and to help the craftswomen receive a fair share of the proceeds from sales of their work.

=== Other projects ===
With her next book, 2004's Celebrating Women, Gianturco documented festivals and ceremonies in 15 countries across the globe that honor women.

¡Viva Colores! A Salute to the Indomitable People of Guatemala (2006), with text by David Hill and photos by Gianturco, taken over a ten-year span, is a collection of vivid, colorful photos of seemingly ordinary Guatemalans who are making a difference in their communities.

Her 2007 book Women Who Light the Dark spotlights women who have overcome issues such as poverty, disease and violence to improve themselves and their communities. Gianturco interviewed and photographed women in 15 countries on 5 continents.

Grandmother Power: A Global Phenomenon was published in 2012. Gianturco, a grandmother herself, profiles activist grandmothers from 15 countries across 5 continents, with the women telling their stories in their own words, accompanied by Gianturco's photos. She began researching the book in 2006 while in Kenya working on Women Who Light the Dark, where she observed a “new international activist grandmother movement.”

Wonder Girls: Changing Our World, written with her granddaughter Alex Sangster, documents the work of groups of activist girls in thirteen countries. Musimbi Kanyoro, the president and CEO of the Global Fund for Women, wrote the foreword for the book. The book received a Nautilus Book Grand/Gold Award in the Social Change/Social Justice category in 2017.

== Honors and exhibits ==
Gianturco is a former board member of the Association for Women's Rights in Development; and a former board chair of the Washington-based Crafts Center. 40 Over 40 listed her as one of 40 Women to Watch Over 40 in 2013. Women's e-News named her one of Leaders for the 21st Century in 2014.

Some of the venues and locations where her work has been exhibited include the United Nations in New York, UNESCO in Paris, the Field Museum of Natural History in Chicago, the International Museum of Women in San Francisco, and at the Smithsonian Folklife Festival in Washington, DC. The Grand Rapids Public Museum mounted an exhibit based on her book Grandmother Power: A Global Phenomenon, from September 6, 2013, through February 2, 2014.

Grandmother Power won the 2013 International Book Award for Multicultural Nonfiction; ForeWord Reviews' 2012 Book of the Year award for Women's Studies; Living Now's 2013 Gold Medal for Social Activism/Charity; and About.com's 2013 Readers' Choice Award for Favorite Grandparenting Book.

== Bibliography ==
- Wonder Girls: Changing Our World - with Alex Sangster (2017, powerHouse Books)
- Grandmother Power: A Global Phenomenon (2012, powerHouse Books)
- Women Who Light the Dark (2007, powerHouse Books)
- ¡Viva Colores! A Salute to the Indomitable People of Guatemala – with David Hill (2006, powerHouse Books)
- Celebrating Women (2004, powerHouse Books)
- In Her Hands: Craftswomen Changing the World – with Toby Tuttle (2000, Monacelli Press)
