= Poggiomarino railway station =

Railway station in Poggiomarino, Naples, Italy

Poggiomarino
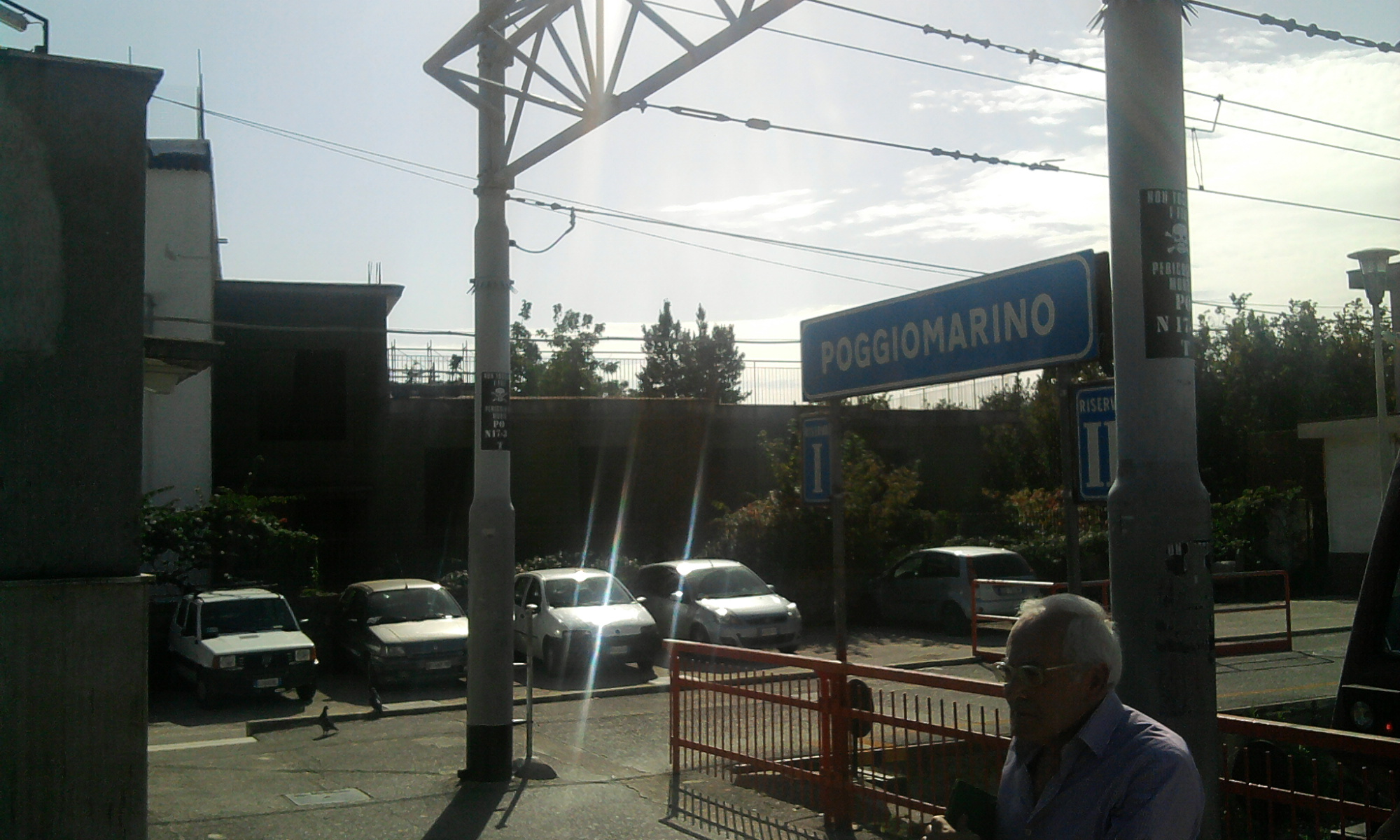

General information
- Location: Via Roma, Poggiomarino 80040 NA; Poggiomarino, Metropolitan City of Naples, Campania; Italy
- Coordinates: 40°48′02.81″N 14°32′25.88″E
- Line: Circumvesuviana Naples-Poggiomarino line Naples-Sarno line
- Train operators: EAV

History
- Opened: 1904; 122 years ago

Services
Preceding station	Circumvesuviana	Following station
Cangiani towards Napoli Porta Nolana	Naples-Poggiomarino line	Terminus
Preceding station	Circumvesuviana	Following station
Flocco towards Napoli Porta Nolana	Naples-Sarno line	Terminus
Location
- Location within Campania Location within Italy

Poggiomarino railway station is a railway station in Poggiomarino, Metropolitan City of Naples, Italy. It is served by the Naples-Poggiomarino and Naples-Sarno lines of Circumvesuviana railway network, managed by EAV.

== Station layout ==
Inaugurated in 1904, the station features a passenger building with a waiting room and ticket office.

There are six tracks: two serve as terminal tracks for the Naples–Poggiomarino line, two are used by trains bound for Naples and Sarno, and two are currently out of service. There is no freight terminal.

== Connections ==
- Bus stop

== See also ==
- List of railway stations in Campania
