= Sorrento railway station =

Railway station in Sorrento, Naples, Italy

Sorrento
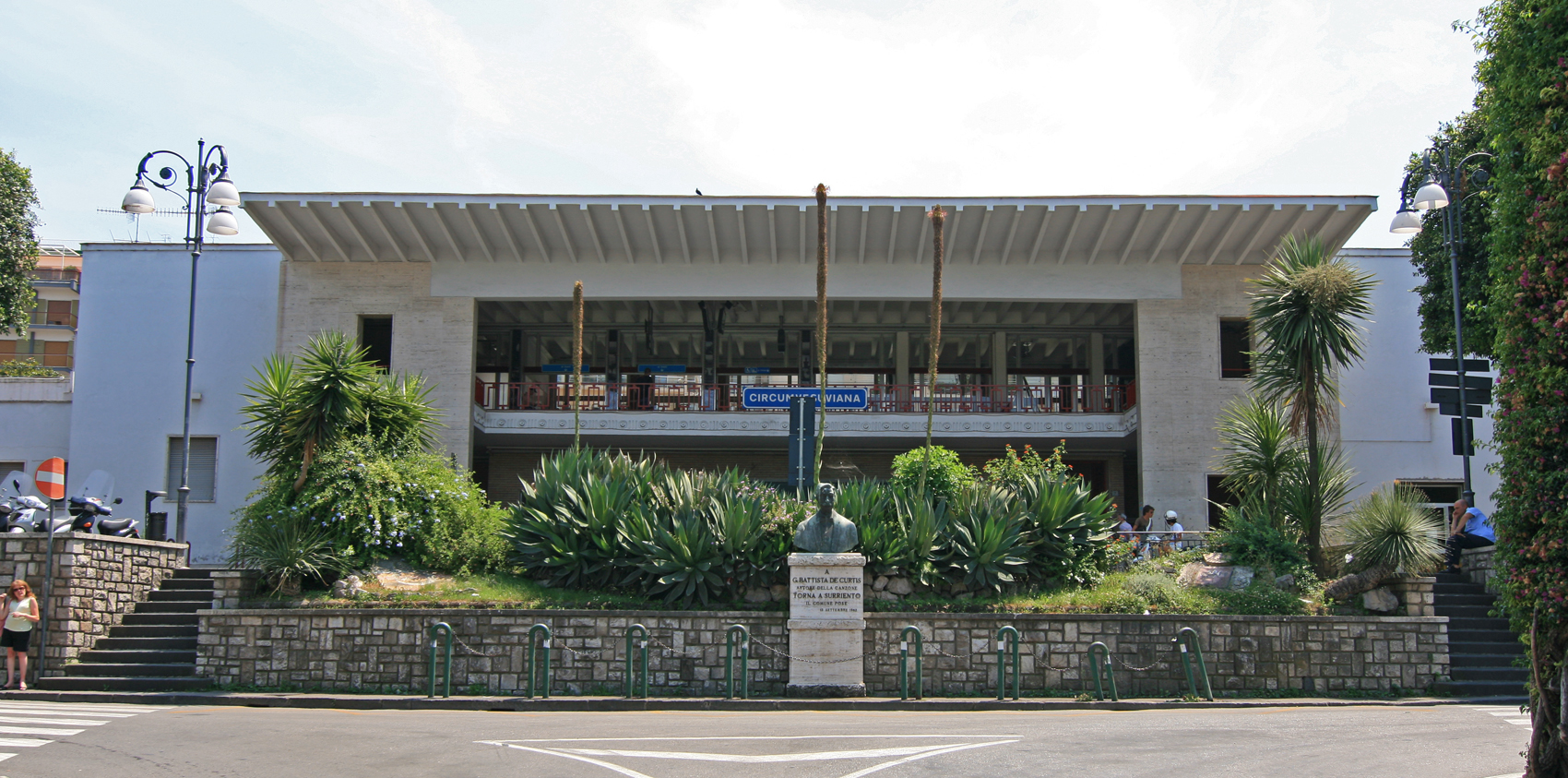

General information
- Location: Piazza Giovanni Battista de Curtis, Sorrento 80067 NA; Sorrento, Metropolitan City of Naples, Campania; Italy
- Coordinates: 40°37′32.75″N 14°22′47.37″E
- Line: Circumvesuviana Naples-Sorrento line
- Train operators: EAV

History
- Opened: 1948; 78 years ago

Services
Preceding station	Circumvesuviana	Following station
Sant'Agnello towards Napoli Porta Nolana	Naples-Sorrento line	Terminus
Location
- Location within Campania Location within Italy

Sorrento railway station is a railway station in Sorrento, Metropolitan City of Naples, Italy. It is served by the Naples-Sorrento line of Circumvesuviana railway network, managed by EAV.

== Passenger movement ==
The station, located in the city center, is frequented daily by both commuters and tourists, especially during the period from March to October.

In addition to regular and express trains departing for Napoli Porta Nolana, the Campania Express service has been introduced in recent years. This service, operated with dedicated trains primarily for tourists, stops at major tourist destinations along the Naples-Sorrento line, including Castellammare di Stabia, Pompei, and Ercolano.

From the square in front of the station, buses depart both for various areas of the city and for Massa Lubrense, Positano, Amalfi, and other nearby towns.

== Connections ==
- Bus stop

== See also ==
- List of railway stations in Campania
