= Circumvesuviana =

Railway network in Naples, Italy

Circumvesuviana railway

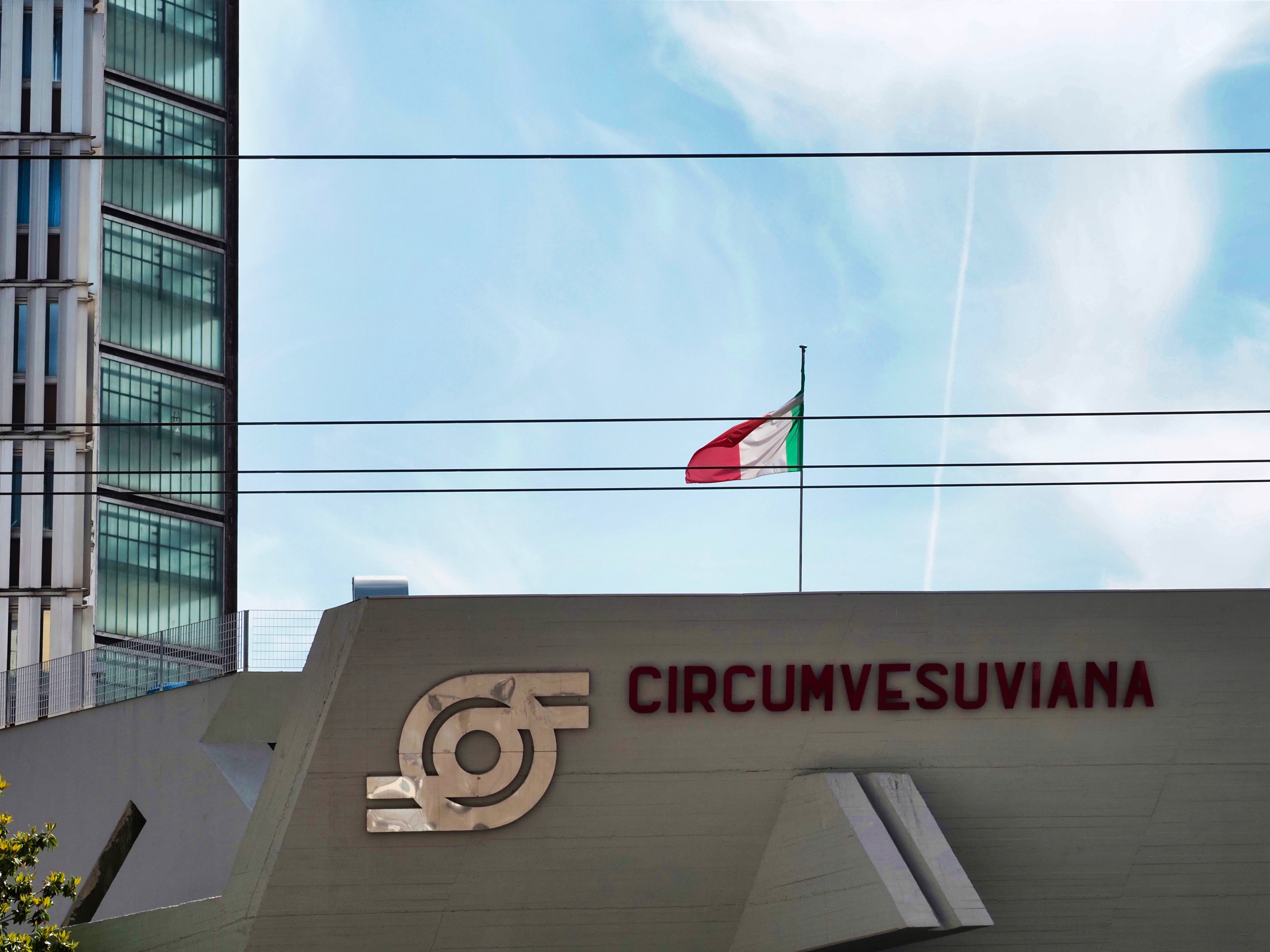
- Terminus Napoli Porta Nolana.

Overview
- Status: Operational
- Owner: Campania Regional Government
- Locale: Metropolitan City of Naples; Province of Salerno; Province of Avellino
- Termini: Napoli Porta Nolana; Various
- Stations: 96
- Website: eavsrl.it

Service
- Type: Commuter rail
- System: Naples metropolitan railway service
- Services: 6
- Operator: EAV
- Rolling stock: 30 SFSM ETR 001-085; 25 SFSM ETR 086-118; 23 ETR 200 Metrostar
- Daily ridership: 64,848 (2023)

History
- Opened: November 18, 1890

Technical
- Line length: 142.7 km (88.7 mi)
- Character: Primary
- Track gauge: 950 mm (3 ft 1 3/8 in)
- Minimum radius: il
- Electrification: Overhead line, 1,500 V DC
Route map
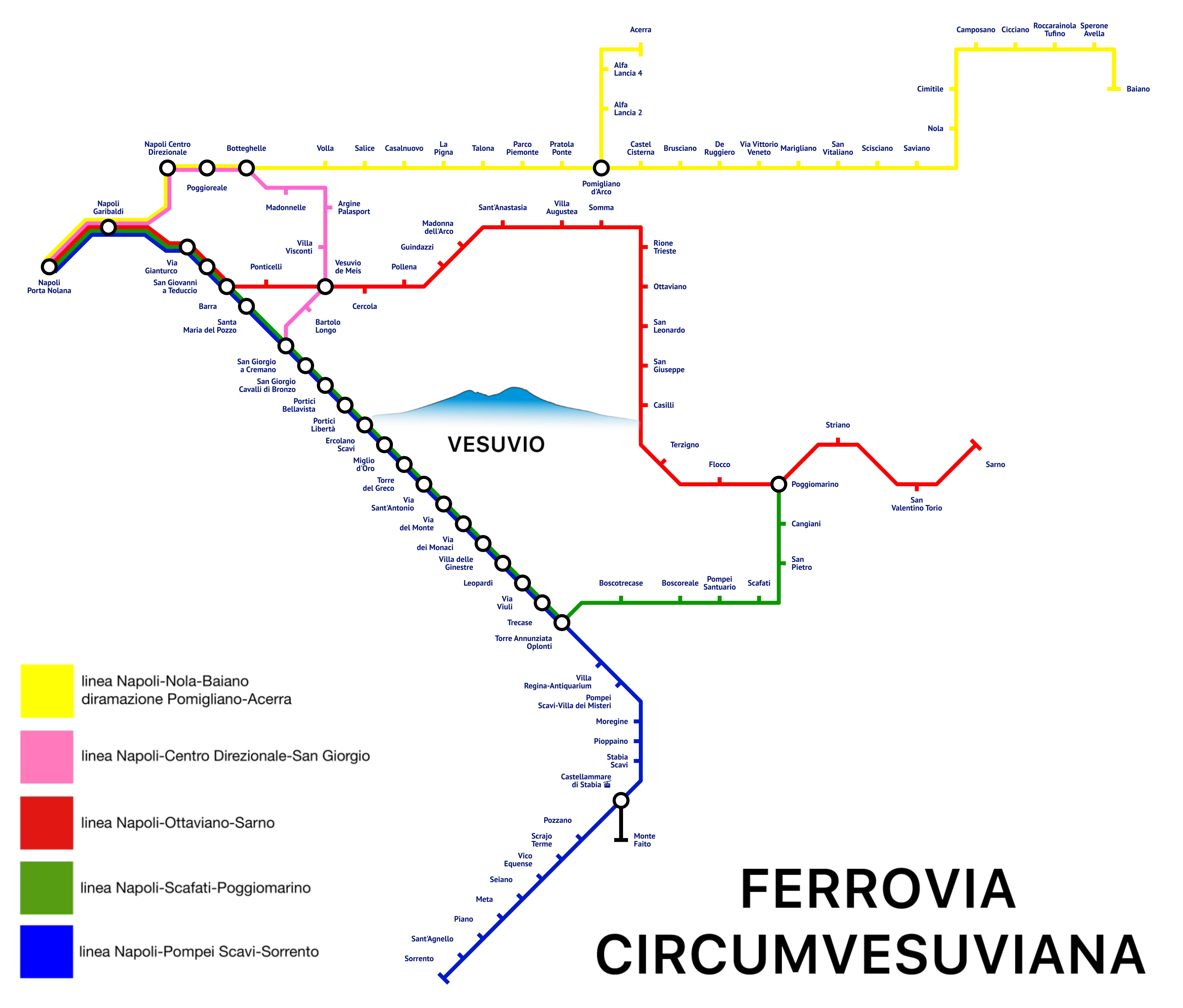

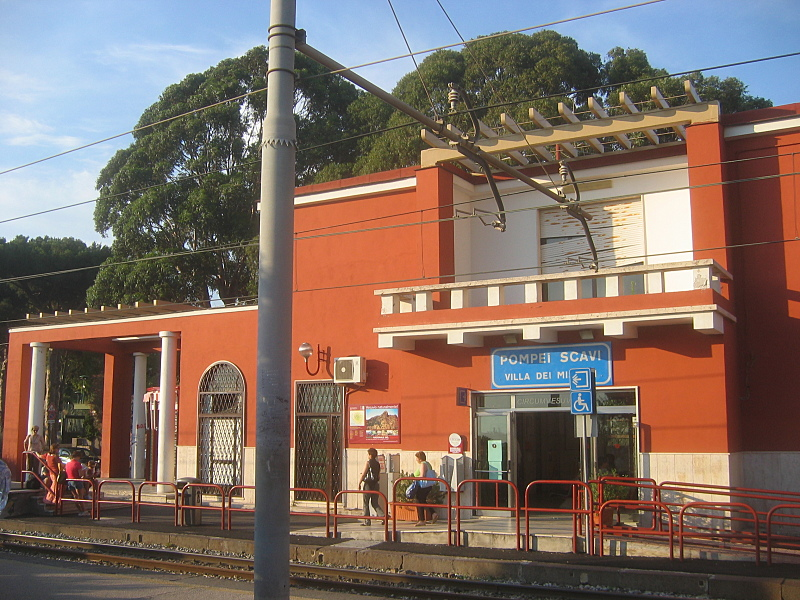
Pompei Scavi services the main entrance to Pompeii

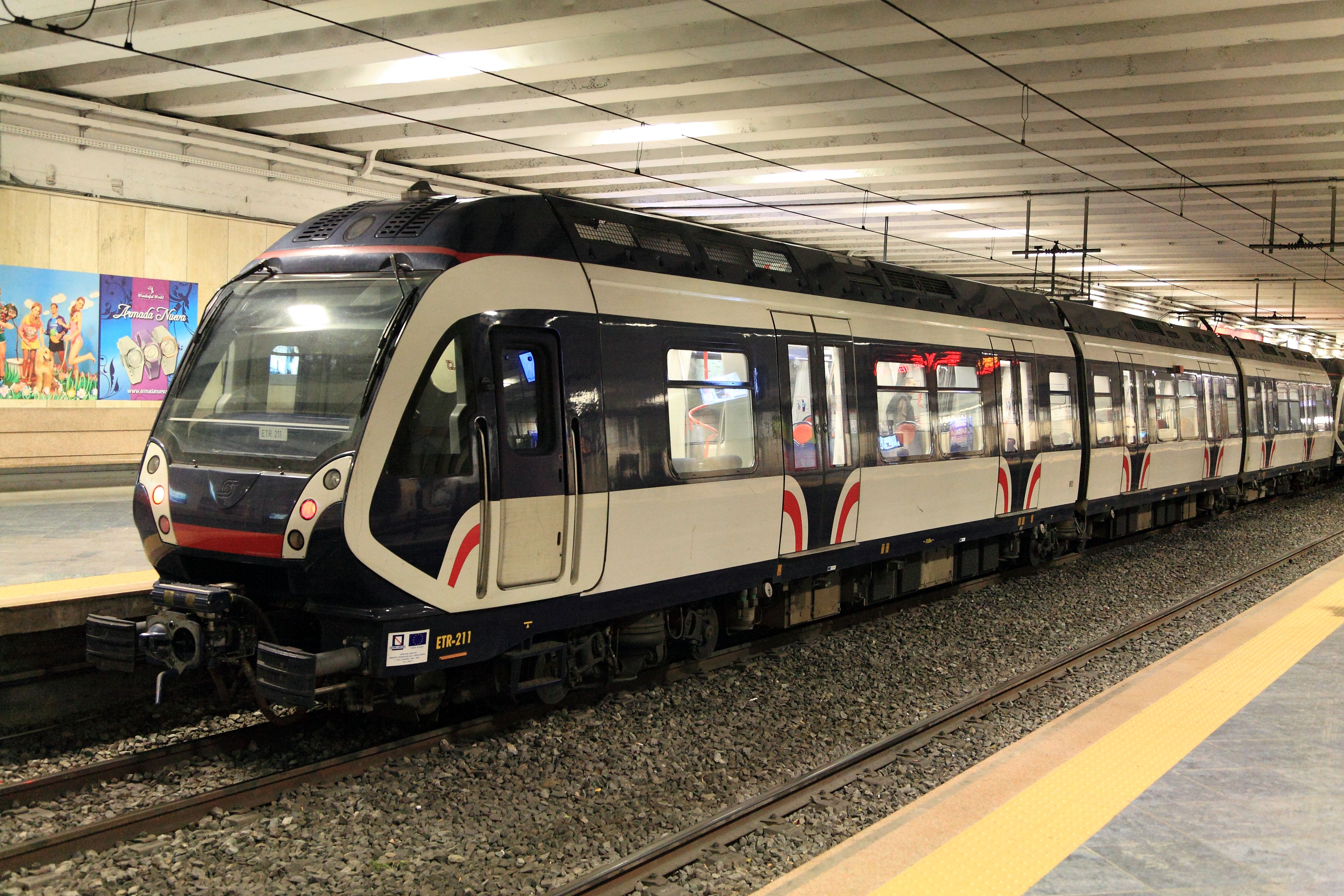
ETR 211 Metrostar at Napoli Garibaldi

Circumvesuviana (Italian pronunciation: [ˌtʃirkuɱvezuˈvjaːna]) is a 142-kilometre-long (88 mi) railway network in the east of the Naples metropolitan area, operated by EAV. Electrically powered throughout, the system uses the narrow gauge of 950 mm (3 ft 1 3/8 in) and operates 142 km (88 mi) of route on six lines. It is entirely separate from other national and regional railway lines. It has 96 stations with an average interstation distance of 1.5 km (0.9 mi).

The Circumvesuviana railway covers a wide catchment area of over 2 million people, distributed in 47 municipalities, including Scafati, San Valentino Torio and Sarno in the province of Salerno and Avella and Baiano in the province of Avellino. The network forms an important commercial artery, and provides services to the tourist destinations of Pompeii and Herculaneum.

All routes start from the Napoli Porta Nolana terminus near the Porta Nolana, and pass through Napoli Garibaldi station before splitting into several branches to towns in the province. A journey along the entirety of the longest route, the 47 km (29 mi) from Naples to Sorrento, takes about one hour.

In 2024, the railway network transported approximately 23 million passengers.

== History ==
=== Early years ===
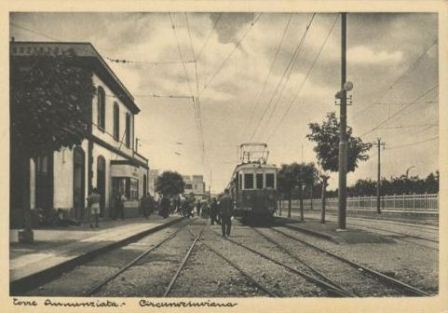
Torre Annunziata Oplonti railway station.

In 1884, a narrow-gauge railway line was inaugurated, connecting Naples with Baiano via Nola, operated by the Société Anonyme Chemin de fer Naples-Nola-Baiano et Extensions.

However, the true birth of the Circumvesuviana dates back to November 18, 1890, when the Società Anonima Ferrovia Napoli Ottaviano inaugurated the line between these locations. On February 9 of the following year, the line was extended to San Giuseppe Vesuviano (then a district of Ottaviano), reaching a length of 23 km. The entire railway was a single-track, narrow-gauge line operated with steam traction.

In May 1901, management was taken over by the Società Anonima Strade Ferrate Secondarie Meridionali (SFSM), which, over the following years, extended the original line to Sarno and built a new coastal route. This route connected Naples with the densely populated towns of Portici, Ercolano, Torre del Greco, Torre Annunziata, and Pompei, before merging with the Naples-Sarno line near Poggiomarino. This expansion completed the ideal railway loop around Mount Vesuvius, effectively creating the Circumvesuviana, which stretched approximately 64 km, crossed 23 municipalities, served a population of about 300,000 people, and recorded around 3 million passengers annually.

On March 25, 1905, the Naples-Pompei-Poggiomarino line was electrified.

A significant event took place on January 6, 1913, with the inauguration of Pugliano station, which was shared with the Pugliano-Vesuvio railway.

=== 21st Century ===
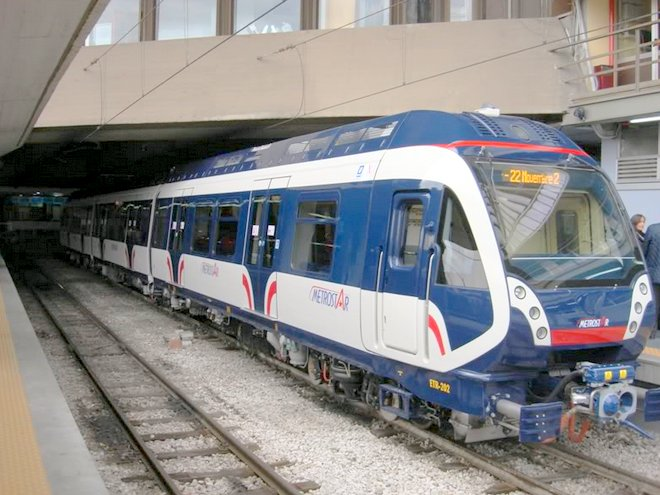
Metrostar train in operation since 2008

Following Decree-Law No. 422 of November 19, 1997, local-interest railways were gradually transferred to the Regions, which became responsible for public transportation services. As part of this reform, on January 1, 2001, the governmental commissioner management (Gestione commissariale governativa di aziende di trasporto) ceased, and Circumvesuviana Srl, a company owned by the Campania Region, was established.

During the same period, new routes were inaugurated, including the Botteghelle-San Giorgio a Cremano section of the Naples-Baiano line, which connects Botteghelle station to San Giorgio a Cremano, passing through the Ponticelli district with five underground stations. Another extension involved the existing link between Pomigliano d’Arco and the Alfa Lancia industrial area, extending to Acerra, reaching a total length of 3 km.

At the end of 2008, the double-tracking of the Ponticelli-Cercola section on the Naples-Ottaviano-Sarno line was completed. In the same year, the new series 200 electric trains entered service.With the arrival of these trains, stations underwent modifications, including raising the platforms.

In 2009, a section of the Naples-Poggiomarino line, including Boscoreale and Boscotrecase stations, was reopened after a complete reconstruction with double-track underground alignment.

In 2010, a train derailed in the Gianturco area, resulting in one fatality and numerous injuries.

On December 27, 2012, the management company was merged into Ente Autonomo Volturno (EAV), which subsequently took over operation of the entire network.

In 2017, the Villa Regina-Antiquarium station was inaugurated in Torre Annunziata, along the Torre Annunziata-Sorrento line. That same year, work resumed on the double-tracking project between Pompei Scavi and Castellammare di Stabia, which had been halted since 2011.

The double-tracking project on the Naples-Sorrento line is ongoing, including:

- Activation of the second track between Torre Annunziata and Castellammare di Stabia
- Demolition of Via Nocera station to accommodate the second track
- Construction of a road and pedestrian underpass, replacing the Via Giuseppe Cosenza level crossing
- Excavation of a new tunnel parallel to the existing one, eliminating the Via Grotta San Biagio level crossing
- Installation of noise barriers along the railway area

The underpass will ensure a constant connection between Castellammare Centro and Rione San Marco, eliminating current interruptions caused by level crossing closures. It will also create pedestrian and vehicular access areas for emergency vehicles and commercial loading/unloading. This project is essential as it will increase train frequency on the Naples-Castellammare route to every 12 minutes and improve connections to Sorrento.

A new connection between the Circumvesuviana lines and the High-Speed Rail network is under construction as of 2026, connecting Volla station to Napoli Afragola station.

== Lines ==
Circumvesuviana railway lines

All lines are powered by electric overhead lines. The trains operate under the following categories:

- A (Accelerato): train stops at all stations
- DD (Direttissimo): train stops only at selected stations, without surcharge
- EXP (Campania Express): train stops only at selected stations, with surcharge

Circumvesuviana
Lines	Opening	Length	Stations	Route	Stops	Travel time
Naples – Baiano	1885	38 km (24 mi)	28	Porta Nolana - Nola - Baiano	28	59 minutes
Naples – Sarno	1891	38 km (24 mi)	28	Porta Nolana - Ottaviano- Sarno	28	65 minutes
Naples – Poggiomarino	1904	35 km (22 mi)	25	Porta Nolana -Scafati - Poggiomarino	25	57 minutes
Naples – Sorrento	1932	47 km (29 mi)	35	Porta Nolana - Torre Annunziata - Sorrento	35	68 minutes
Branch; Botteghelle – San Giorgio	2001	8 km (5 mi)	7	Porta Nolana - Centro Direzionale - San Giorgio	11	15 minutes
Branch; Pomigliano d'Arco – Acerra	2005	3 km (1.9 mi)	4	Porta Nolana - Pomigliano - Acerra	16	28 minutes

== Rolling stock ==
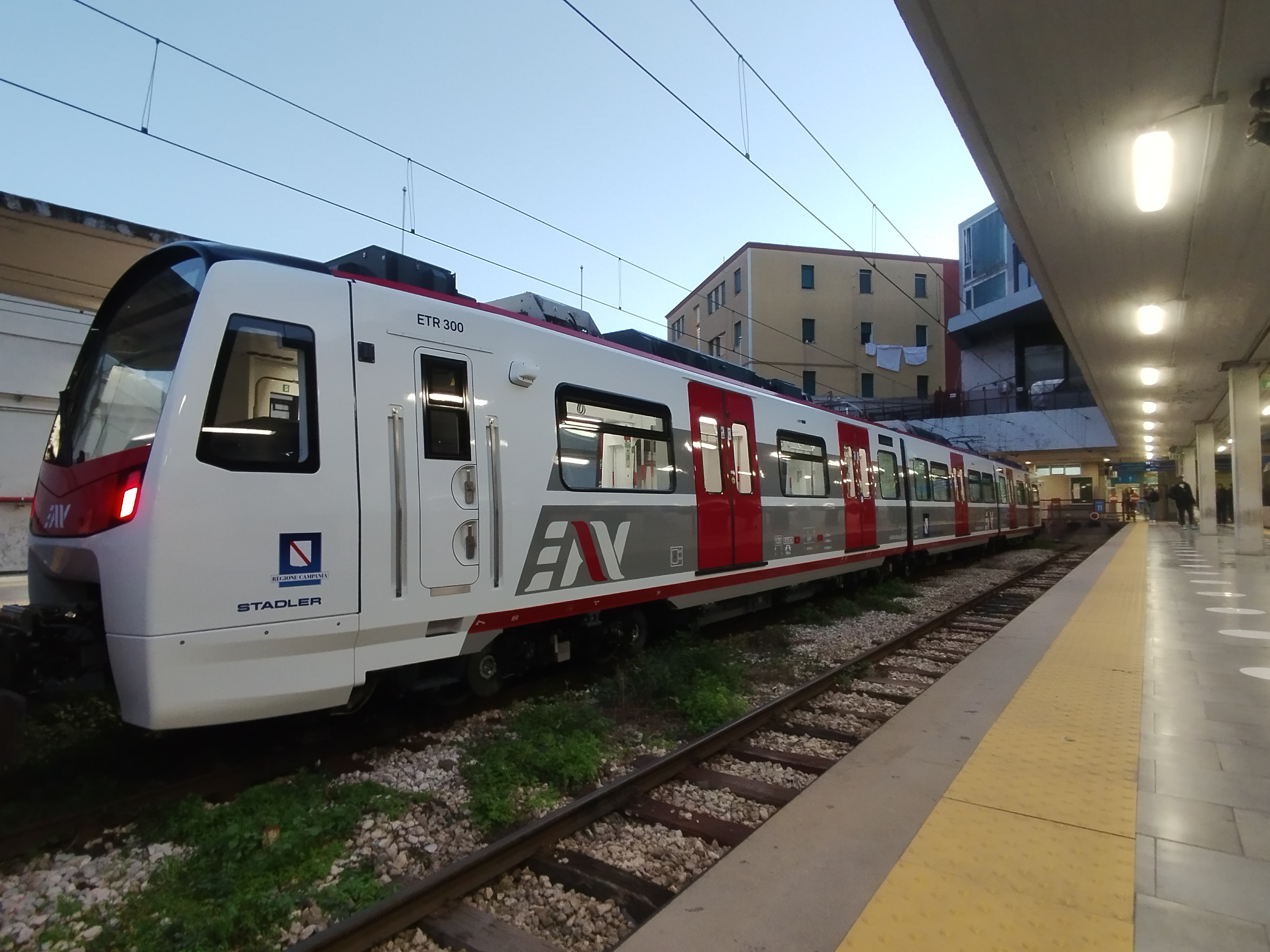
One of the new Stadler trains.

The network uses three types of rolling stock, all electrically powered: FE220 units, "Metrostar" articulated trains, and Stadler EMUs. Power is supplied by overhead catenary and the train motors can generate up to 500 kW (670 hp) of power.

The FE220 cars are usually coupled together to form a two- or three-car multiple units, painted white with red doors and ends. The FE220 trains come in two different variations.

Twenty-six ETR211 "Metrostar" three-car articulated units were introduced between November 2008 and September 2009. Manufactured by a consortium of Firema and AnsaldoBreda, these trains are capable of carrying 450 passengers and are styled by Pininfarina. As well as being more powerful than the FE220 units, they have computer driving aids, self-levelling suspension. These units are mostly used to provide the express service whilst the FE220 provide cheaper, stopping services which tend to be far more crowded.

In October 2024 the first of the new trains ordered from Stadler was delivered; all in all, 56 new trains had been ordered and were delivered in 2025 and 2026.

== See also ==
- Naples metropolitan railway service
- List of suburban and commuter rail systems
