= Napoli Porta Nolana railway station =

Railway station in Naples, Italy

Napoli Porta Nolana
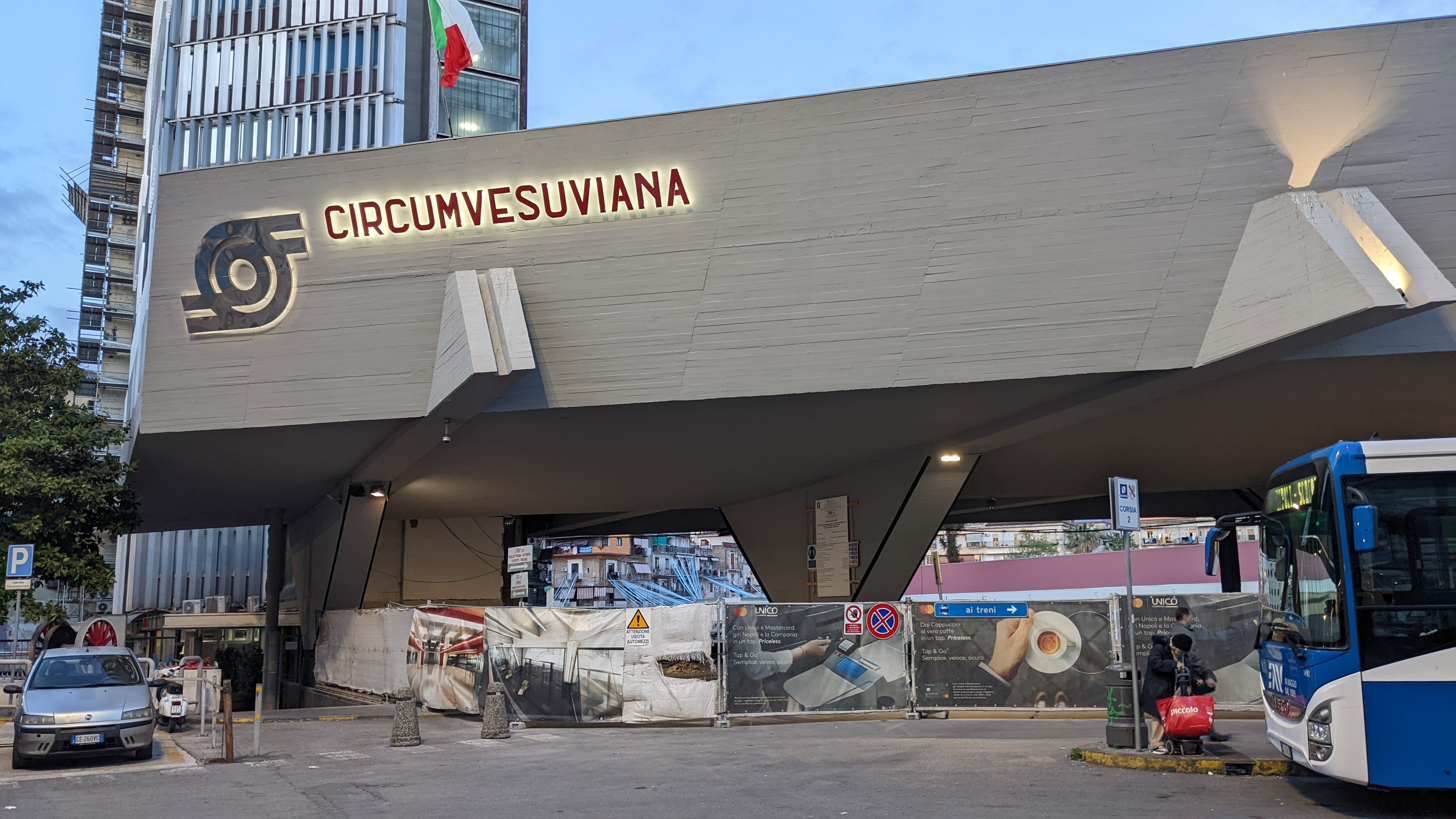
- The outside of the station.

General information
- Location: Naples, Campania; Italy
- Coordinates: 40.8492°N 14.2692°E
- Line: Circumvesuviana
- Train operators: EAV

History
- Opened: 1891; 135 years ago
Location
- Location within Campania Location within Italy

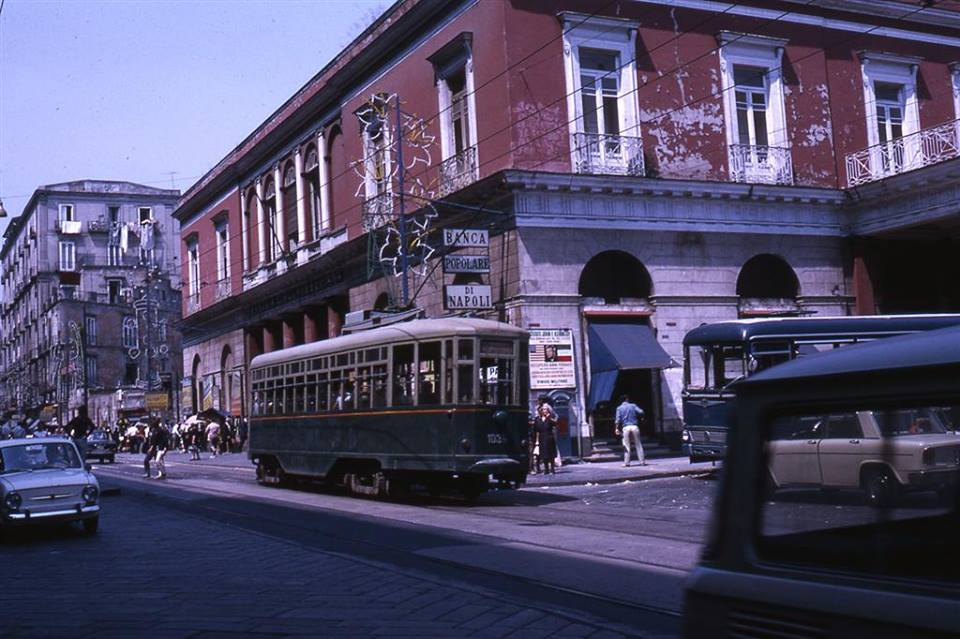
The main station building before the renovation in the 1970s

Napoli Porta Nolana station (Italian: Stazione di Napoli Porta Nolana) is the main and terminal station of the Circumvesuviana railways, today managed by the Ente Autonomo Volturno (EAV).

The station bears this name (derived from nearby Porta Nolana) since 2003; previously the station was simply called Napoli, although it was known colloquially as Napoli Terminale.

== History ==
The station was opened for operation in 1843, as the Neapolitan terminus of the line for Caserta. It was built immediately north of the Bayard company station, the terminus of the railway to Salerno. The two stations were connected by a connecting track.

Following the concentration of the two railway lines in the new station of Napoli Centrale (1867), Porta Nolana station lost its function as a passenger terminus, downgraded to a service facility.

Some years later the station passed to the Società Anonima Ferrovia Napoli–Ottaviano (the current Circumvesuviana), which used it as the terminus of the Naples-Ottaviano line, the first of a vast network. In 1904 the station became the terminus of the line for Torre Annunziata, and in the sixties of that for Baiano.

The original traveler building, dating back to the Bourbon era, was demolished in the early seventies and replaced by the current one, built from 1972 to 1975 to a design by Giulio De Luca and Arrigo Marseille. The structure is in reinforced concrete with a cantilevered roof, and exposed concrete beams that protrude up to a certain point, and then become innervated in the roof. On the roof there is a reinforced concrete floor, connected to a glazed building that houses the various services and offices of the main headquarters of the EAV.

The platform surface is raised by a few tens of centimeters, with a concrete roof supported by pillars of the same material.

== Structures and installations ==
The Napoli Porta Nolana station has 13 trunk tracks all dedicated to passenger traffic (the Circumvesuviana has never had freight service), as well as a small garage for the electric trains temporarily not used.

== Movement ==
The Naples Porta Nolana station is the terminus of the entire Circumvesuviana network: trains leave for Sorrento, Baiano, Poggiomarino, San Giorgio a Cremano, and Sarno.

== Services ==
The station has:

- Automatic ticket office
- Toilet

== See also ==
- History of rail transport in Italy
- List of railway stations in Naples
- List of railway stations in Campania
- Railway stations in Italy
