= Baia railway station =

Railway station in Bacoli, Naples, Italy

Baia
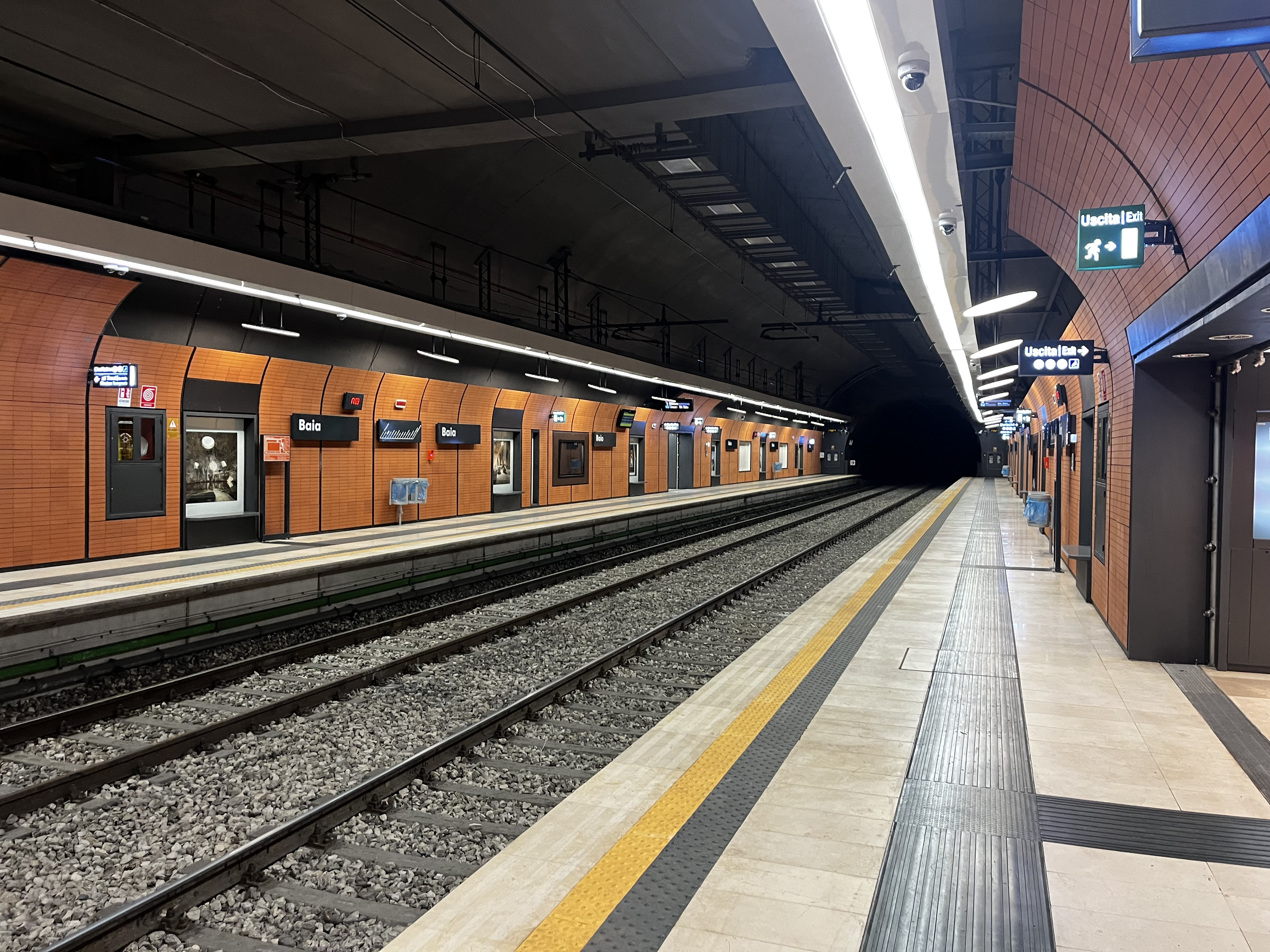
- View of the station's track level

General information
- Location: Bacoli, Metropolitan City of Naples, Campania; Italy
- Coordinates: 40°49′15.9″N 14°04′17.31″E
- Line: Cumana
- Train operators: EAV

History
- Opened: 6 November 2025; 9 months ago

Services
Preceding station	Naples SFM	Following station
Lucrino towards Montesanto	Cumana railway	Fusaro towards Torregaveta
Location
- Location within Campania Location within Italy

Baia railway station is a railway station in Bacoli, Metropolitan City of Naples, Italy. It is served by the Cumana railway line, managed by EAV.

== History ==
The current underground station has replaced the previous surface facility located in the center of Baia (area of Bacoli), in Piazza Alcide De Gasperi. The original station, inaugurated in 1890, was decommissioned in 1999 in preparation for the doubling of the railway line between Arco Felice and Torregaveta.

Construction of the new station began following project approval in 2003.

Works were completed by December 31, 2024, and the inauguration took place on November 6, 2025.

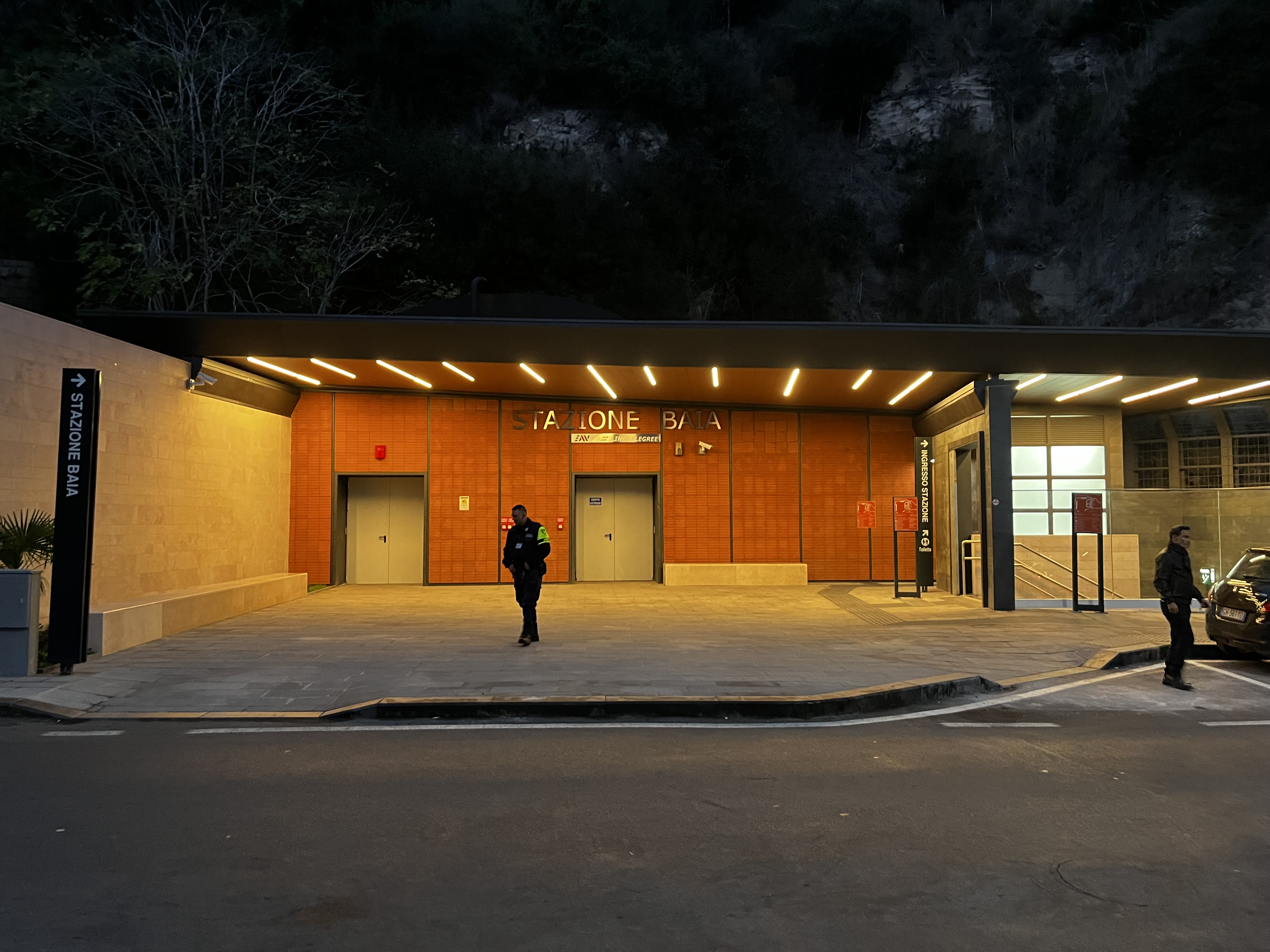
Station façade.

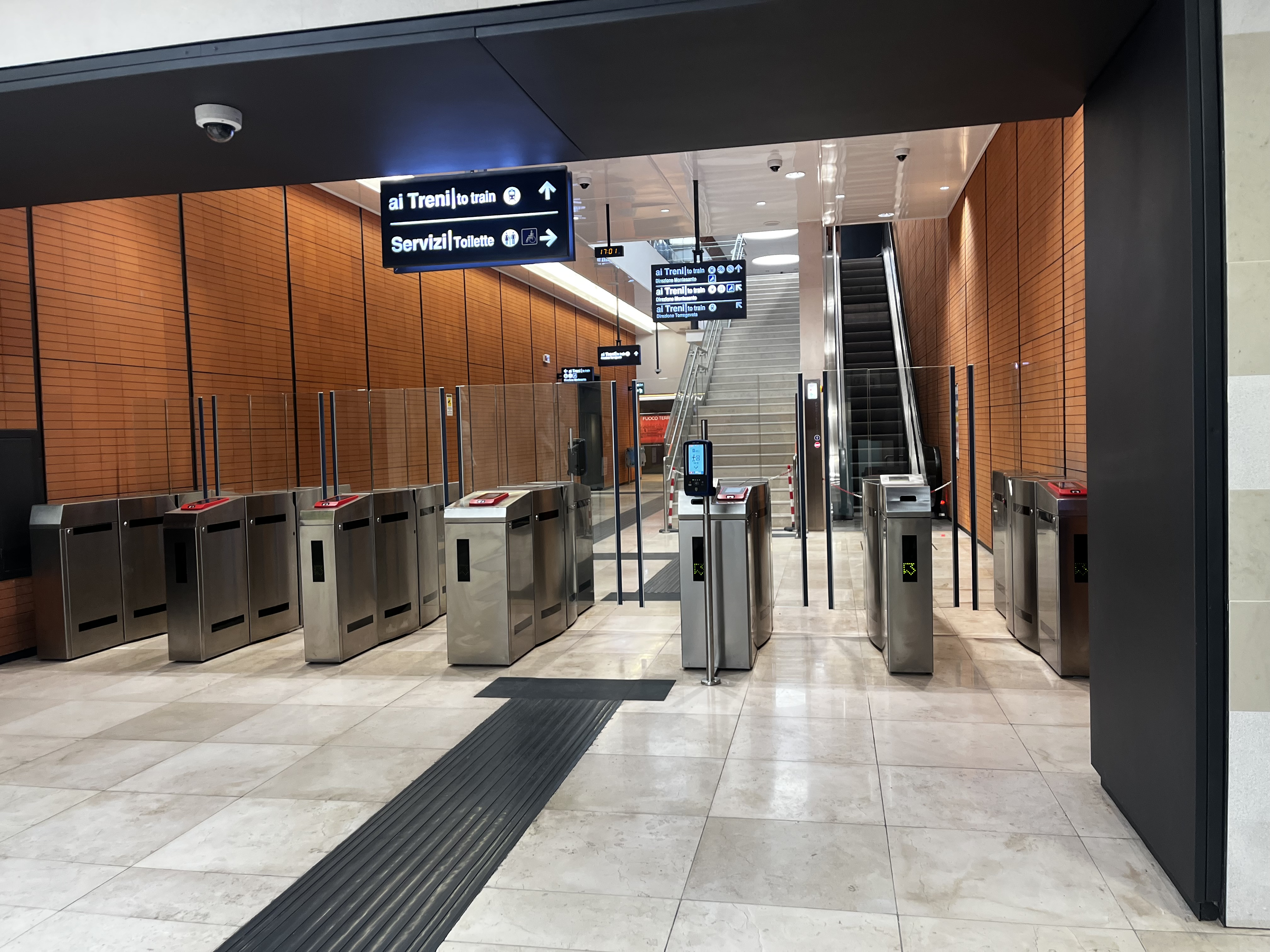
Concourse.

== See also ==
- List of railway stations in Campania
