= Lucrino railway station =

Railway station in Pozzuoli, Naples, Italy

Lucrino
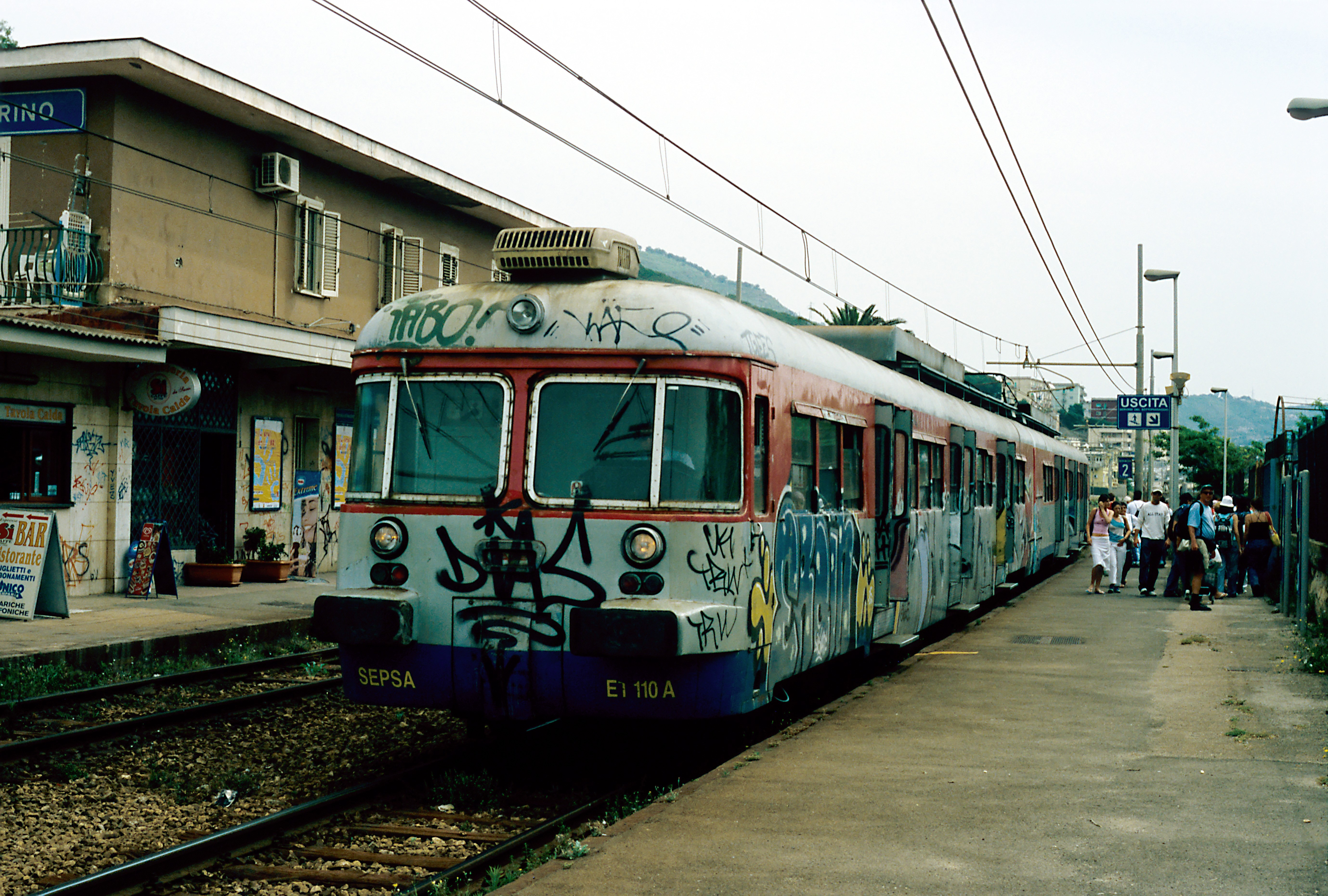

General information
- Location: Pozzuoli, Metropolitan City of Naples, Campania; Italy
- Coordinates: 40°49′45.84″N 14°05′01.32″E
- Line: Cumana
- Train operators: EAV

History
- Opened: 16 February 1890; 136 years ago

Services
Preceding station	Naples SFM	Following station
Arco Felice towards Montesanto	Cumana railway	Baia towards Torregaveta
Location
- Location within Campania Location within Italy

Lucrino railway station is a railway stop in Pozzuoli, Metropolitan City of Naples, Italy. It is served by the Cumana railway line, managed by EAV.

== History ==
The station was inaugurated on February 16, 1890, as part of the Pozzuoli-Cuma Fusaro route.

== Passenger movement ==
The station is frequented in the summer due to its proximity to beach resorts and in the spring when visitors can explore the archaeological sites.

== See also ==
- List of railway stations in Campania
