= Dazio railway station =

Railway station in Naples, Italy

Dazio
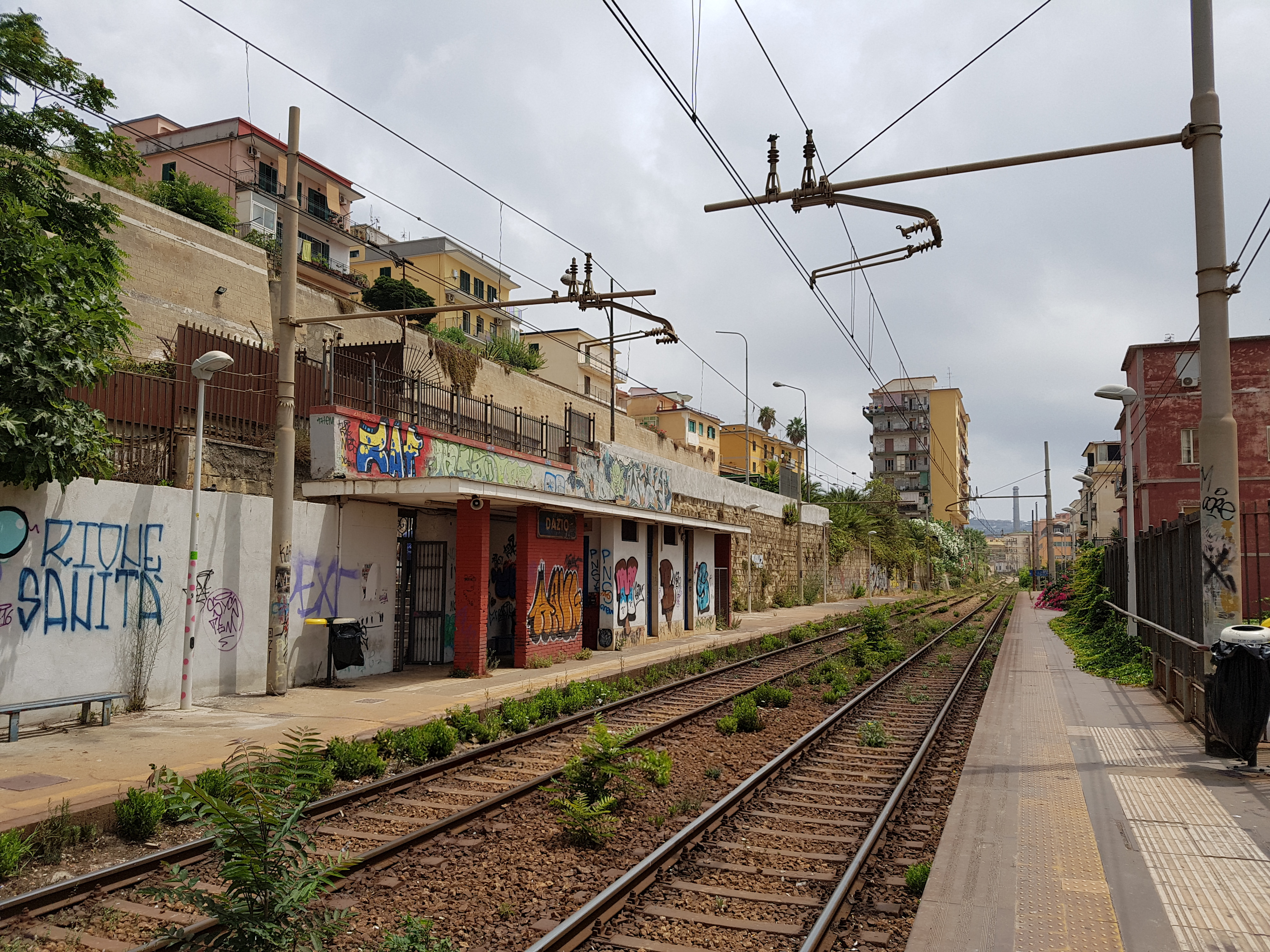

General information
- Location: Naples, Campania; Italy
- Coordinates: 40°49′02.64″N 14°09′35.28″E
- Line: Cumana
- Tracks: 2
- Train operators: EAV

History
- Opened: 12 July 1890; 136 years ago

Services
Preceding station	Naples SFM	Following station
Bagnoli-Città della Scienza towards Montesanto	Cumana railway	Gerolomini towards Torregaveta
Location
- Location within Campania Location within Italy

Dazio railway station (Italian: Stazione di Dazio) is a railway stop in Naples, Italy. It is served by the Cumana railway line, managed by EAV.

== History ==
By the end of 2024, the doubling of the railway track on the section between Dazio and Arco Felice stations was completed. At the same time, another significant intervention affected the section between Dazio and the former Cantieri station, with the construction of a new tunnel under Mount Olibano. This infrastructure, approximately 500 metres (1,600 ft) long, was designed to improve the railway route, enhancing safety and reducing travel times. During 2024, EAV announced the continuation of work for the opening of the second Mount Olibano tunnel, located between the Dazio and Gerolomini stops.

To allow for the advancement of these infrastructural works, railway service on certain sections of the Cumana was suspended during the spring of 2024.

== Connections ==
- Bus stop

== See also ==
- History of rail transport in Italy
- List of railway stations in Naples
- List of railway stations in Campania
- Railway stations in Italy
