= Agnano railway station =

Railway stop in Naples, Italy

Agnano

General information
- Location: Naples, Campania; Italy
- Coordinates: 40°49′04.08″N 14°10′34.68″E
- Line: Cumana
- Tracks: 3 (2 for passengers)
- Train operators: EAV

History
- Opened: 1 July 1889; 137 years ago

Services
Preceding station	Naples SFM	Following station
Edenlandia towards Montesanto	Cumana railway	Bagnoli-Città della Scienza towards Torregaveta
Location
- Location within Campania Location within Italy

Agnano railway station (Italian: Stazione di Agnano) is a railway stop in Naples, Italy. It is served by the Cumana railway line, managed by EAV.

The railway stop has three tracks: the first is for trains heading towards Montesanto, the second for trains towards Torregaveta, and the third, which is non-electrified and a dead-end track, is used by emergency vehicles.

== History ==
In 2019, the station was renovated with a series of murals themed around water, following a collaboration between EAV, the Accademia di Belle Arti di Napoli, and Inward – Osservatorio Nazionale sulla Creatività Urbana.

== Connections ==
- Bus stop

Between 1883 and World War II, a stop on the Naples-Bagnoli-Pozzuoli tramway was active near the station, later replaced by an urban bus line.

== See also ==
- List of railway stations in Campania
