= Mostra–Stadio Maradona railway station =

Railway station in Naples, Italy

Mostra–Stadio Maradona
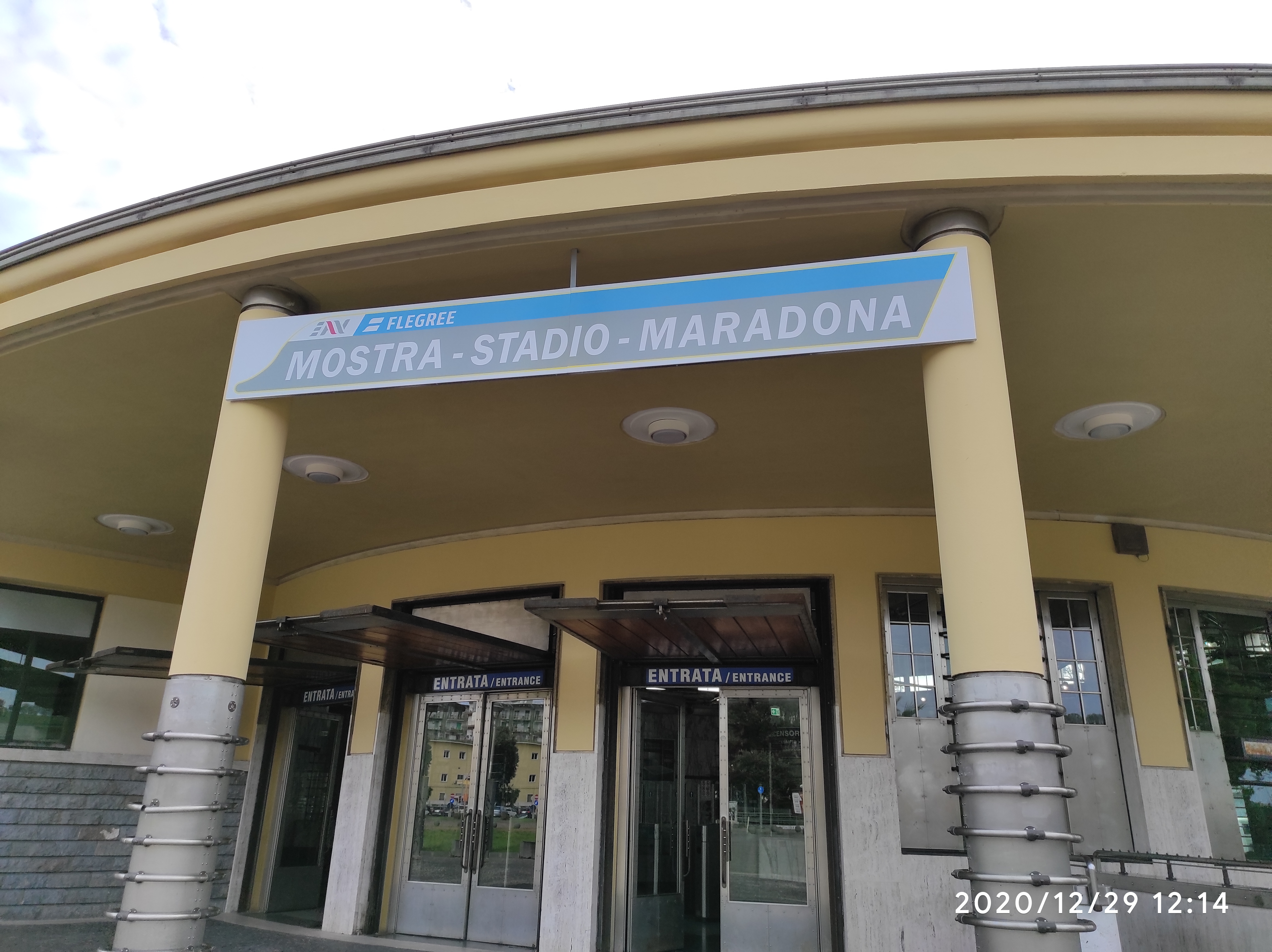

General information
- Location: Naples, Campania; Italy
- Coordinates: 40°48′41.4″N 14°02′41.28″E
- Line: Cumana
- Train operators: EAV
- Connections: Naples Metro (Line 6 at Mergellina); Line 2 at Napoli Campi Flegrei railway station ANM urban and intercity buses

History
- Opened: 1940; 86 years ago

Services
| Preceding station | Naples SFM | Following station |
|---|---|---|
| Fuorigrotta towards Montesanto | Cumana railway | Edenlandia towards Torregaveta |
Route map
- Source: Italian railway atlas
Location
- Location within Campania Location within Italy

Mostra–Stadio Maradona railway station (Italian: Stazione di Mostra–Stadio Maradona) is a railway station in Naples, Italy. It is served by the Cumana railway line, managed by EAV. The station is named after the Mostra d'Oltremare and the Stadio Maradona, both located nearby. It also provides access to the Polytechnic of the University of Naples Federico II.

== History ==
Before adopting its current name, the station was called Taverna delle Rose. The current station building was constructed between 1939 and 1940, designed by architect Frediano Frediani. It was later renovated in the late 1980s, based on a project by Nicola Pagliara, in preparation for the Italy-hosted 1990 FIFA World Cup.

Following a 2019 project, the Forza Napoli Sempre artwork was created along the station's platforms in 2020. This artistic initiative, promoted by the Governor of Campania Vincenzo De Luca, was a collaboration between EAV and Società Sportiva Calcio Napoli.

== Building ==
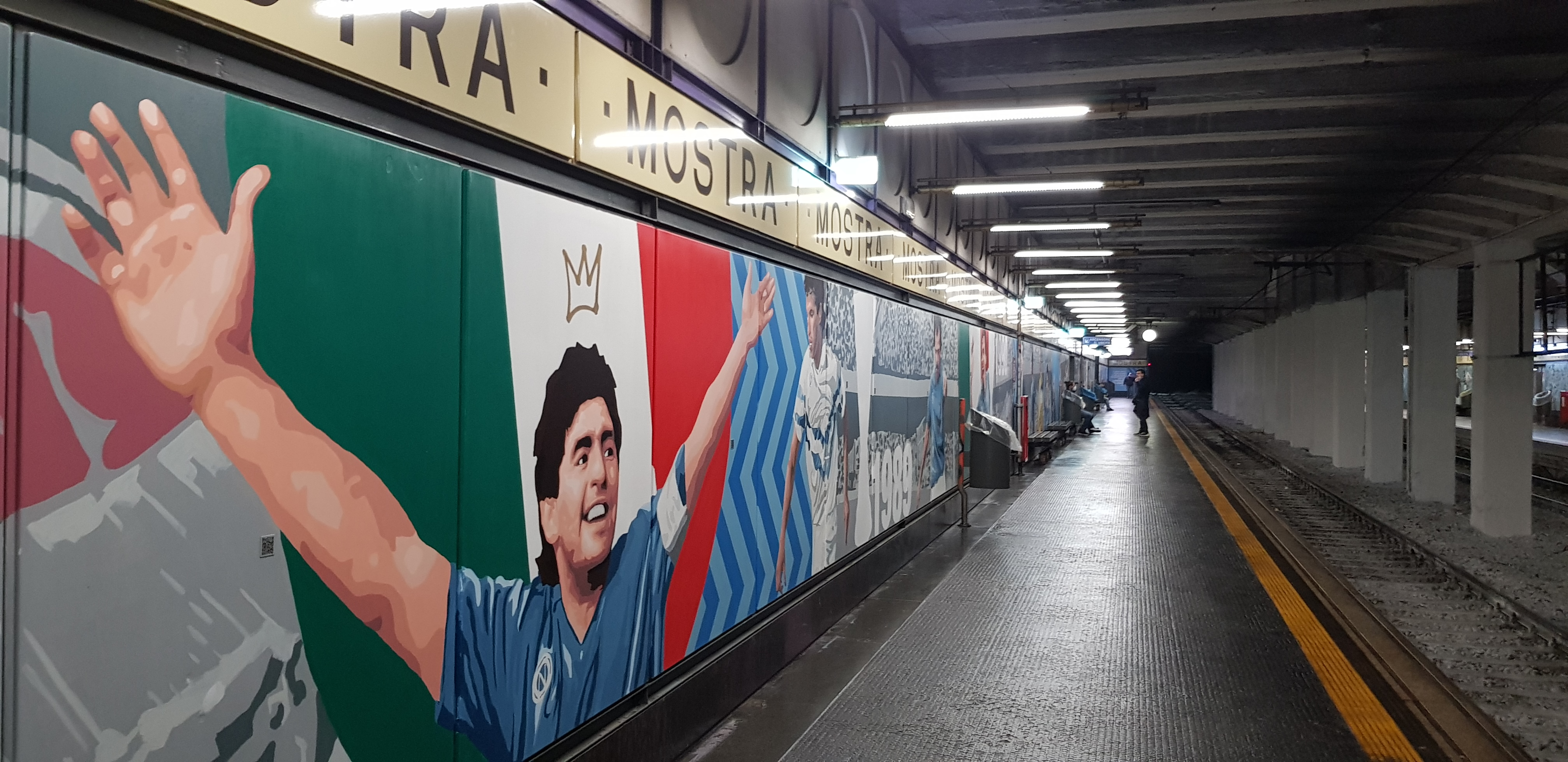
Station interior.

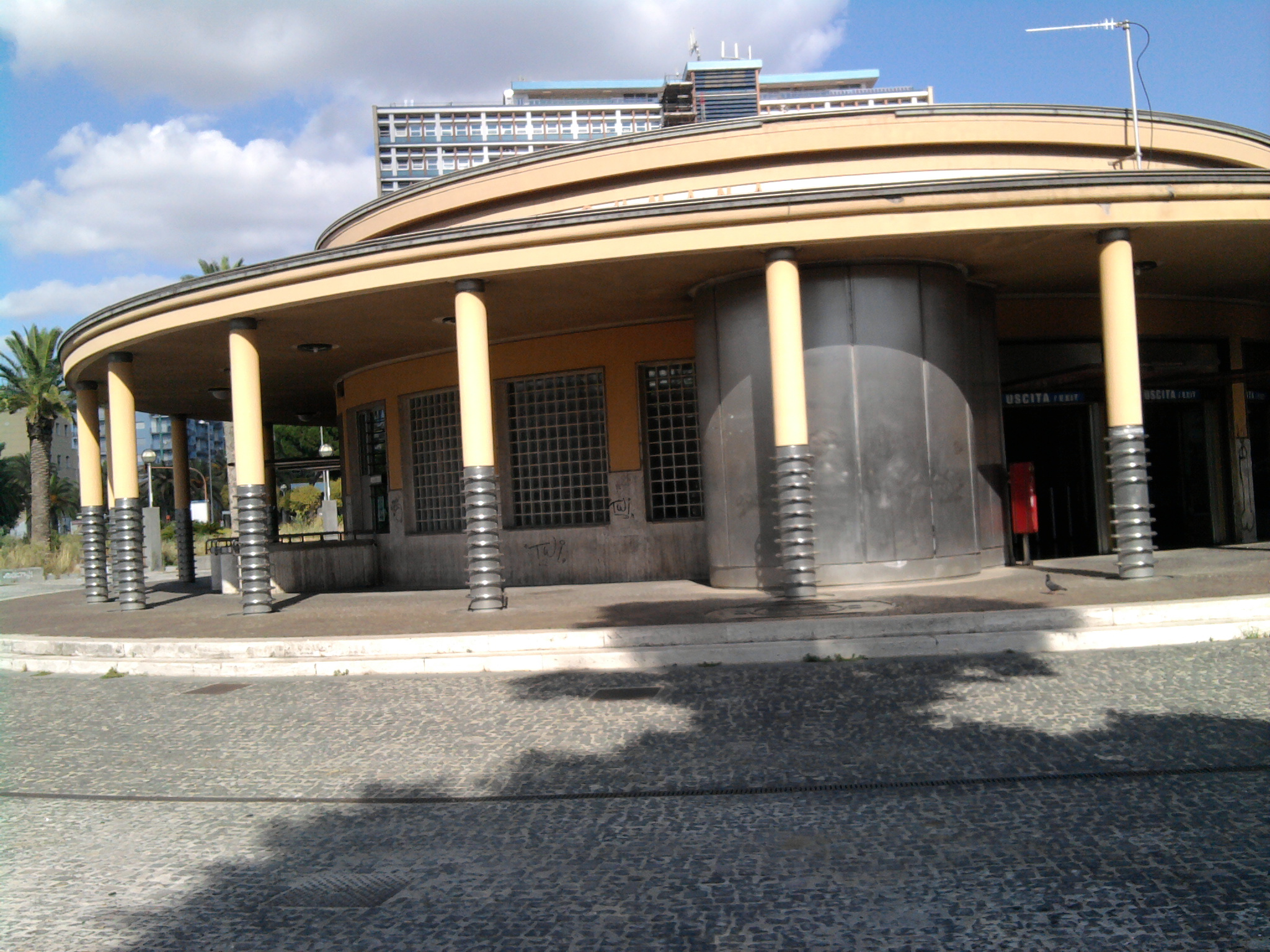
Exterior.

=== Forza Napoli Sempre Artwork ===
It consists of a series of murals created on 130 panels for a total of 300 square metres (3,200 sq ft) retracing the history of SSC Napoli. They depict the figures who have shaped the history of the football club: William Garbutt and Attila Sallustro, pioneers of the 1920s, Bruno Pesaola, Luís Vinício, Omar Sívori, Antonio Juliano, and Giuseppe Savoldi, representing the 1960s and 1970s, Ruud Krol and Giuseppe Bruscolotti, idols of the 1980s.

There are also the protagonists of the championship victories, above all Diego Armando Maradona, the only one to whom two murals were dedicated, Ottavio Bianchi, Careca, Salvatore Bagni, Fernando De Napoli, up to the stars of the new millennium, Marek Hamšík, Ezequiel Lavezzi, Lorenzo Insigne, Kalidou Koulibaly. The artwork was presented to the press on December 5, 2020 in the presence of SSC Napoli's president Aurelio De Laurentiis, player Victor Osimhen, and the EAV president.

The other figures depicted are Giuseppe Cavanna, Riza Lushta, Antonio Vojak, Eraldo Monzeglio, Amedeo Amadei, Hasse Jeppson, Ottavio Bugatti, Gianni Corelli, José Altafini, Dino Zoff, Cané, Luciano Castellini, Francesco Romano, Claudio Garella, Alemão, Andrea Carnevale, Alberto Bigon, Gianfranco Zola, Fabio Cannavaro, Giuseppe Taglialatela, Gianluca Grava, Roberto Carlos Sosa, Cavani, Rafael Benítez, Gonzalo Higuaín, Maurizio Sarri, José Callejón, Dries Mertens, Carlo Ancelotti, Gennaro Gattuso, and Aurelio De Laurentiis.

In addition to the protagonists who have shaped the club's history, the murals also depict the stadiums, the trophies, and four quotes from famous figures. QR codes are embedded in the murals, allowing interactive access to information, while the historical photos were created with the assistance of the Riccardo Carbone Photographic Archive.

== Passenger movement ==
Passenger traffic consists of trains running every twenty minutes in each direction on the Montesanto-Torregaveta route.

== See also ==
- List of railway stations in Campania
