= Bagnoli–Città della Scienza railway station =

Railway station in Naples, Italy

Bagnoli–Città della Scienza
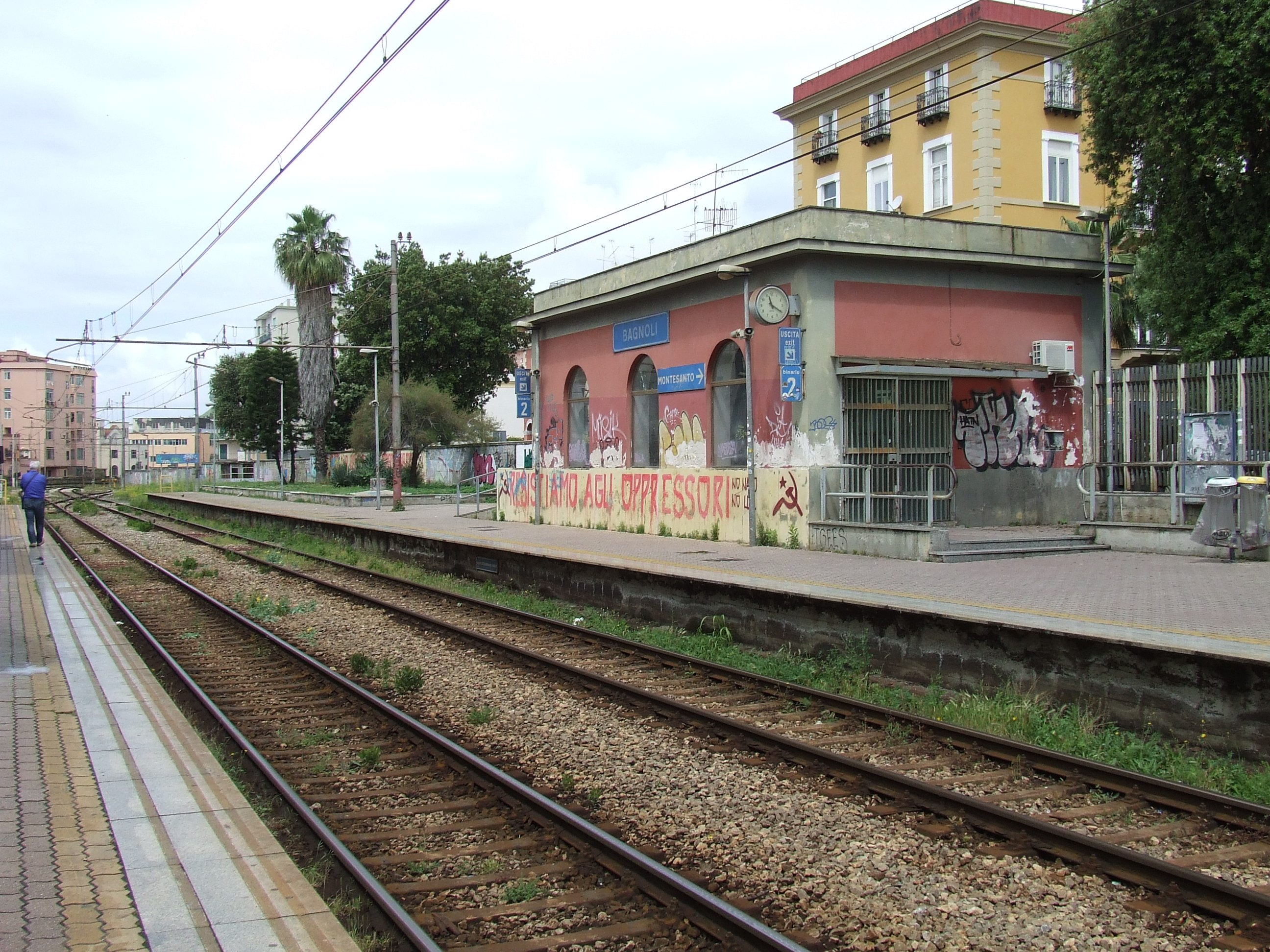

General information
- Location: Naples, Campania; Italy
- Coordinates: 40°48′54″N 14°10′48″E
- Line: Cumana
- Train operators: EAV

History
- Opened: 1 July 1889; 137 years ago

Services
Preceding station	Naples SFM	Following station
Agnano towards Montesanto	Cumana railway	Dazio towards Torregaveta
Route map
- Source: Italian railway atlas
Location
- Location within Campania Location within Italy

Bagnoli–Città della Scienza railway station (Italian: Stazione di Bagnoli–Città della Scienza) is a railway stop in Naples, Italy. It is served by the Cumana railway line, managed by EAV.

== History ==
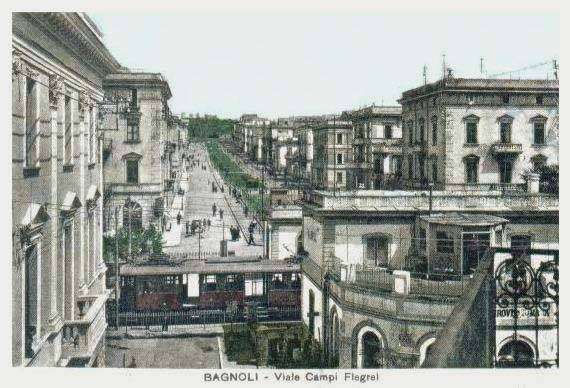
Bagnoli station on an early 20th-century postcard.

The station was inaugurated on July 1, 1889, as part of the Montesanto–Terme Patamia route (the latter station no longer exists).

== Connections ==
- Bus stop

Between 1883 and World War II, a stop on the Naples-Bagnoli-Pozzuoli tramway was active near the station, later replaced by an urban bus line.

== See also ==
- List of railway stations in Campania
