= Edenlandia railway station =

Railway stop in Naples, Italy

Edenlandia
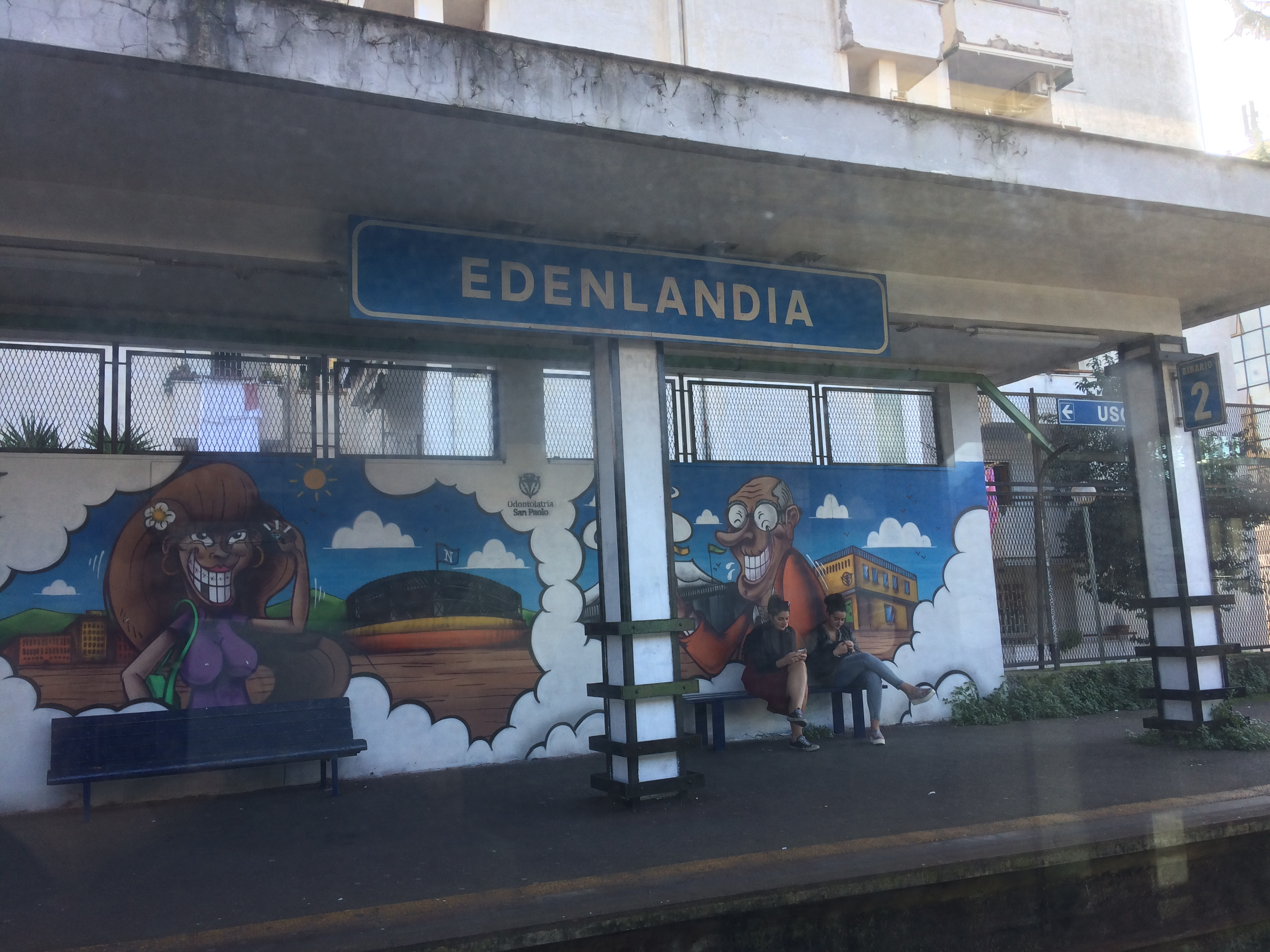

General information
- Location: Naples, Campania; Italy
- Coordinates: 40°49′13.44″N 14°11′00.6″E
- Line: Cumana
- Tracks: 2
- Train operators: EAV

Services
Preceding station	Naples SFM	Following station
Mostra-Stadio Maradona towards Montesanto	Cumana railway	Agnano towards Torregaveta
Route map
- Source: Italian railway atlas
Location
- Location within Campania Location within Italy

Edenlandia railway station (Italian: Stazione di Edenlandia) is a railway stop in Naples, Italy. It is served by the Cumana railway line, managed by EAV. It is named after the Edenlandia amusement park, located in front of the station entrance on Viale Kennedy.

== Station layout ==
In 2016, a mural titled Murale del Sorriso (Mural of the Smile) was inaugurated at the station. The artwork was created by Luca Caputo, known as "Zeus40," who was selected among 25 candidates, all chosen from some of the most renowned street artists in Italy.

== Connections ==
- Bus stop

== See also ==
- History of rail transport in Italy
- List of railway stations in Naples
- List of railway stations in Campania
- Railway stations in Italy
