= Fuorigrotta railway station =

Railway station in Naples, Italy

Fuorigrotta
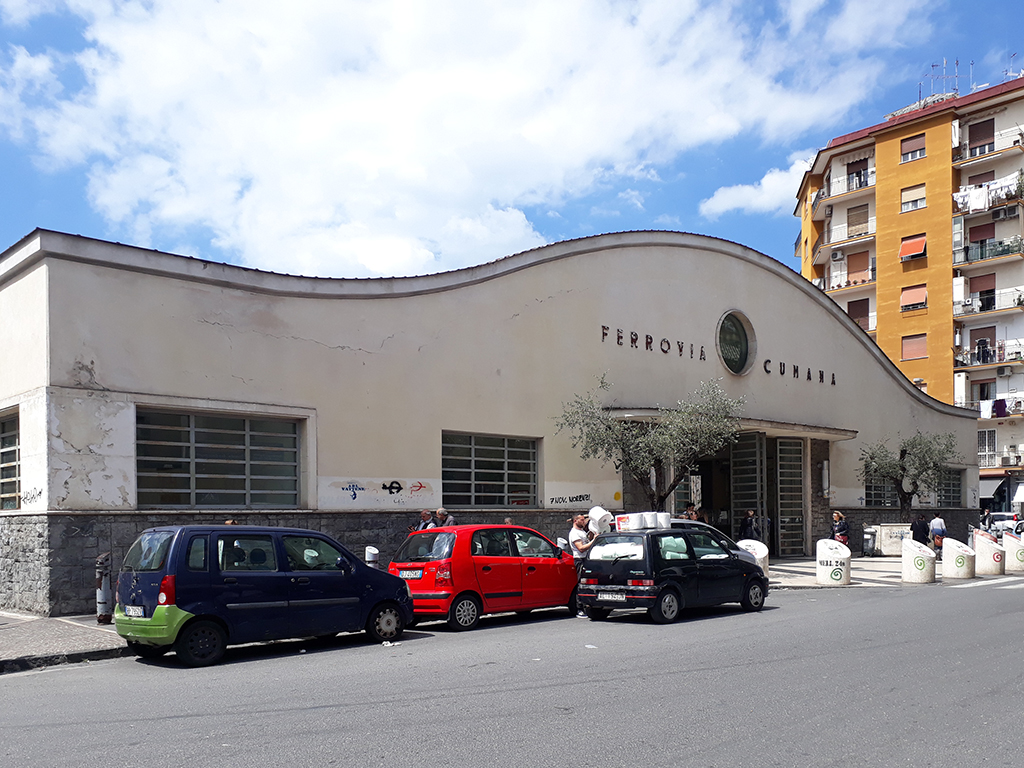

General information
- Location: Naples, Campania; Italy
- Coordinates: 40°49′40.8″N 14°12′06.48″E
- Line: Cumana
- Train operators: EAV

History
- Opened: 1 July 1889; 137 years ago

Services
Preceding station	Naples SFM	Following station
Corso Vittorio Emanuele towards Montesanto	Cumana railway	Mostra-Stadio Maradona towards Torregaveta
Route map
- Source: Italian railway atlas
Location
- Location within Campania Location within Italy

Fuorigrotta railway station (Italian: Stazione di Fuorigrotta) is a railway station in Naples, Italy. It is served by the Cumana railway line, managed by EAV.

== History ==
The station, opened on July 1, 1889, is reached after passing through a 1,050 metres (3,440 ft)-tunnel that runs through the Posillipo hill and takes its name from its location "outside the grotto" (Fuorigrotta).

In the late 1930s, during the undergrounding of the Mergellina-Fuorigrotta railway section, the station was converted into an underground facility. The new station building was constructed between 1939 and 1940, based on a design by architect Frediano Frediani.

== Building ==
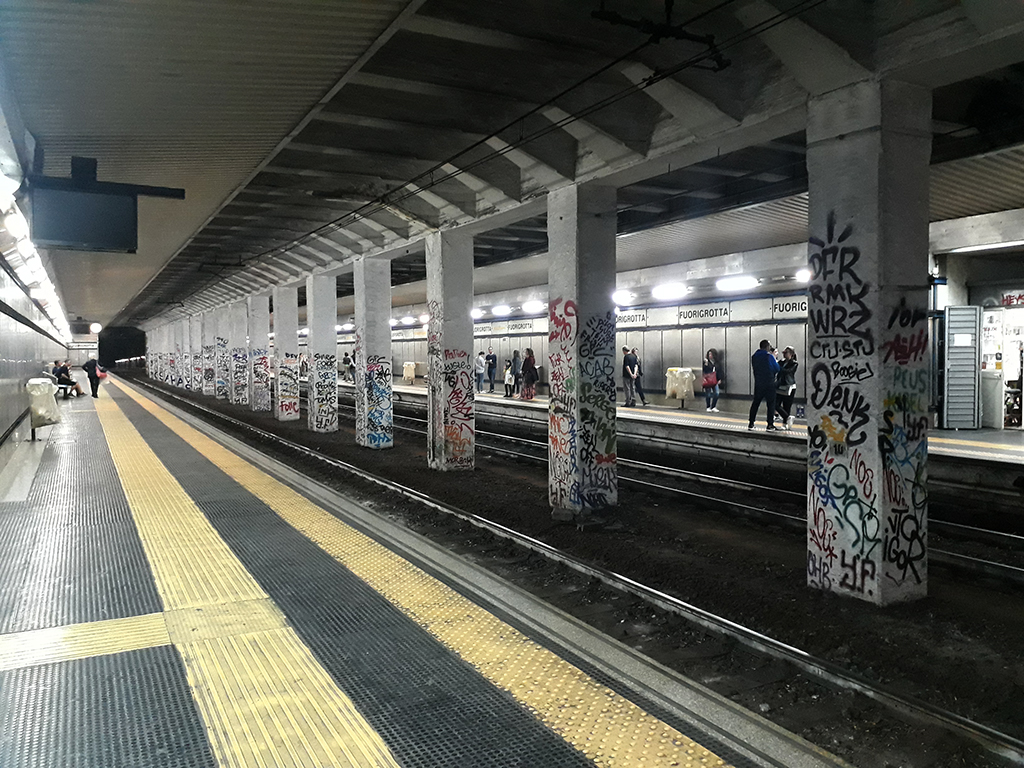
The platform

== Interchange ==
- Bus stop

== See also ==
- History of rail transport in Italy
- List of railway stations in Naples
- List of railway stations in Campania
- Railway stations in Italy
