= Gerolomini railway station =

Railway station in Pozzuoli, Naples, Italy

Gerolomini
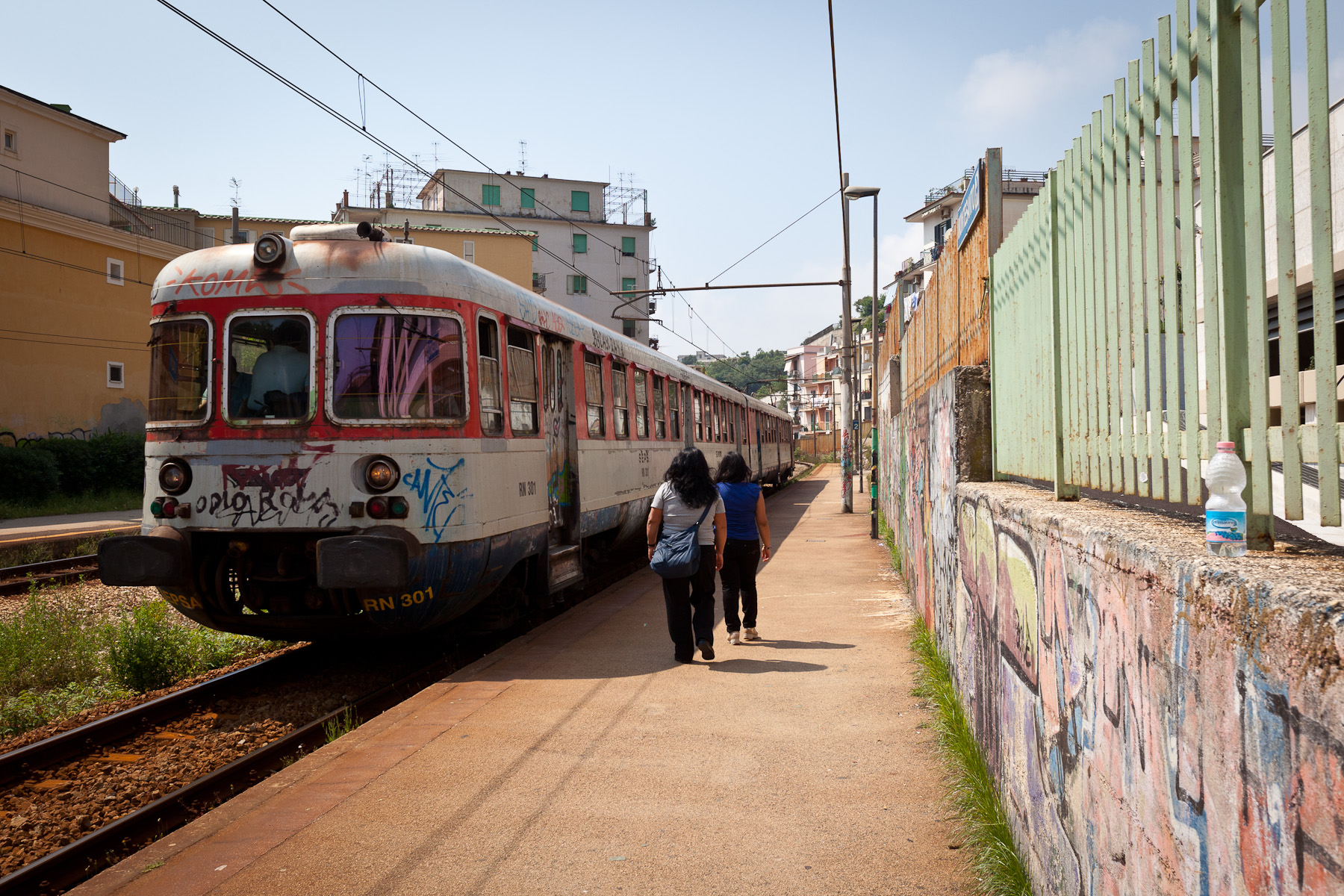

General information
- Location: Pozzuoli, Metropolitan City of Naples, Campania; Italy
- Coordinates: 40°49′15.73″N 14°08′06″E
- Line: Cumana
- Tracks: 2
- Train operators: EAV

History
- Opened: 15 December 1889; 136 years ago

Services
Preceding station	Naples SFM	Following station
Dazio towards Montesanto	Cumana railway	Pozzuoli towards Torregaveta
Location
- Location within Campania Location within Italy

Gerolomini railway station is a railway station in Gerolomini area of Pozzuoli, Metropolitan City of Naples, Italy. It is served by the Cumana railway line, managed by EAV.

== History ==
The station was inaugurated on July 1, 1889, as part of the Terme Patania-Montesanto route (the first station no longer exists).

== Connections ==
- Bus stop

Between 1883 and World War II, a stop on the Naples-Bagnoli-Pozzuoli tramway was active near the station, later replaced by an urban bus line.

== See also ==
- List of railway stations in Campania
- Naples–Bagnoli–Pozzuoli Tramway
