= Pozzuoli railway station =

Railway station in Pozzuoli, Naples, Italy

Pozzuoli

General information
- Location: Pozzuoli, Metropolitan City of Naples, Campania; Italy
- Coordinates: 40°49′44.83″N 14°07′03.52″E
- Line: Cumana
- Tracks: 2
- Train operators: EAV

History
- Opened: 11 September 2026; 0 days ago

Services
Preceding station	Naples SFM	Following station
Gerolomini towards Montesanto	Cumana railway	Arco Felice towards Torregaveta
Location
- Location within Campania Location within Italy

Pozzuoli railway station is a railway station in Naples, Italy. It is served by the Cumana railway line, managed by EAV.

== History ==
The station replaces the previous facility opened in 1889 and located in the historic center of Pozzuoli, on Via A. Maria Sacchini, which was decommissioned along with the old single-track section between Gerolomini and Arco Felice stations to allow for the doubling of the line.

Construction work on the station began on March 15, 2021, with the demolition of Villa Maria to make way for the new station building. As a result, the nearby Cantieri railway station was decommissioned on October 3, 2022.

The station was opened on September 11, 2026.

== Connections ==
- Bus stop

== See also ==
- List of railway stations in Campania
