= Corso Vittorio Emanuele railway station =

Railway station in Naples, Italy

Corso Vittorio Emanuele
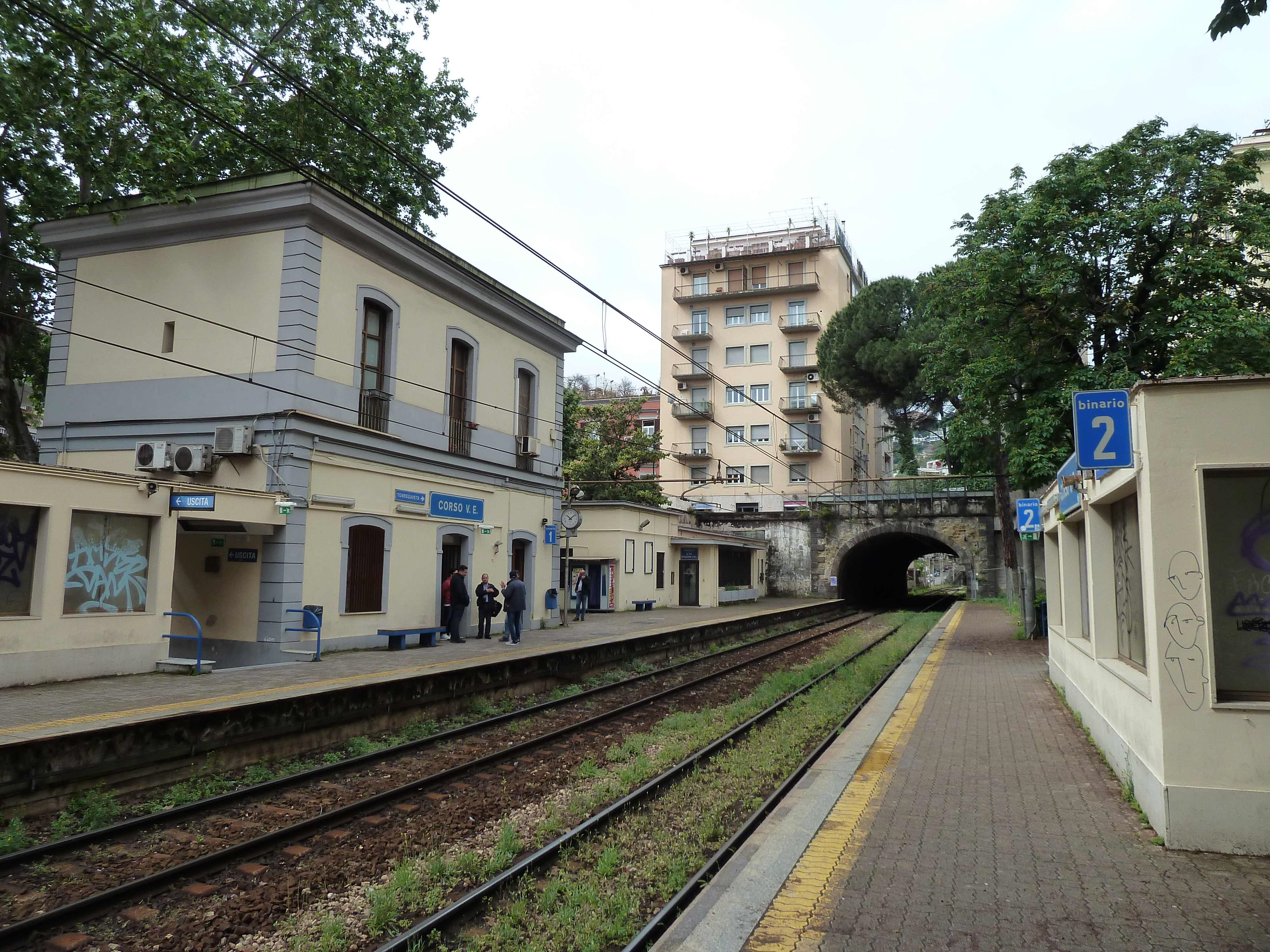

General information
- Location: Naples, Campania; Italy
- Coordinates: 40°50′10.32″N 14°13′16.32″E
- Line: Cumana
- Train operators: EAV

History
- Opened: 1 July 1889; 137 years ago

Services
Preceding station	Naples SFM	Following station
Montesanto Terminus	Cumana railway	Fuorigrotta towards Torregaveta
Route map
- Source: Italian railway atlas
Location
- Location within Campania Location within Italy

Corso Vittorio Emanuele railway station (Italian: Stazione di Corso Vittorio Emanuele) is a railway station in Naples, Italy. It is served by the Cumana railway line, managed by EAV.

== History ==
The station was inaugurated on July 1, 1889, as part of the Montesanto-Terme Patamia route (the latter station no longer exists).

== Building ==
The station is named after the adjacent street of the same name. It can be reached from Montesanto railway station after passing through the Sant'Elmo tunnel, which was excavated in the hill where the historic Castel Sant'Elmo stands and extends for 2,300 metres (7,500 ft).

== Interchange ==
- Bus stop

== See also ==
- History of rail transport in Italy
- List of railway stations in Naples
- List of railway stations in Campania
- Railway stations in Italy
