= Arco Felice railway station =

Railway station in Pozzuoli, Naples, Italy

Arco Felice
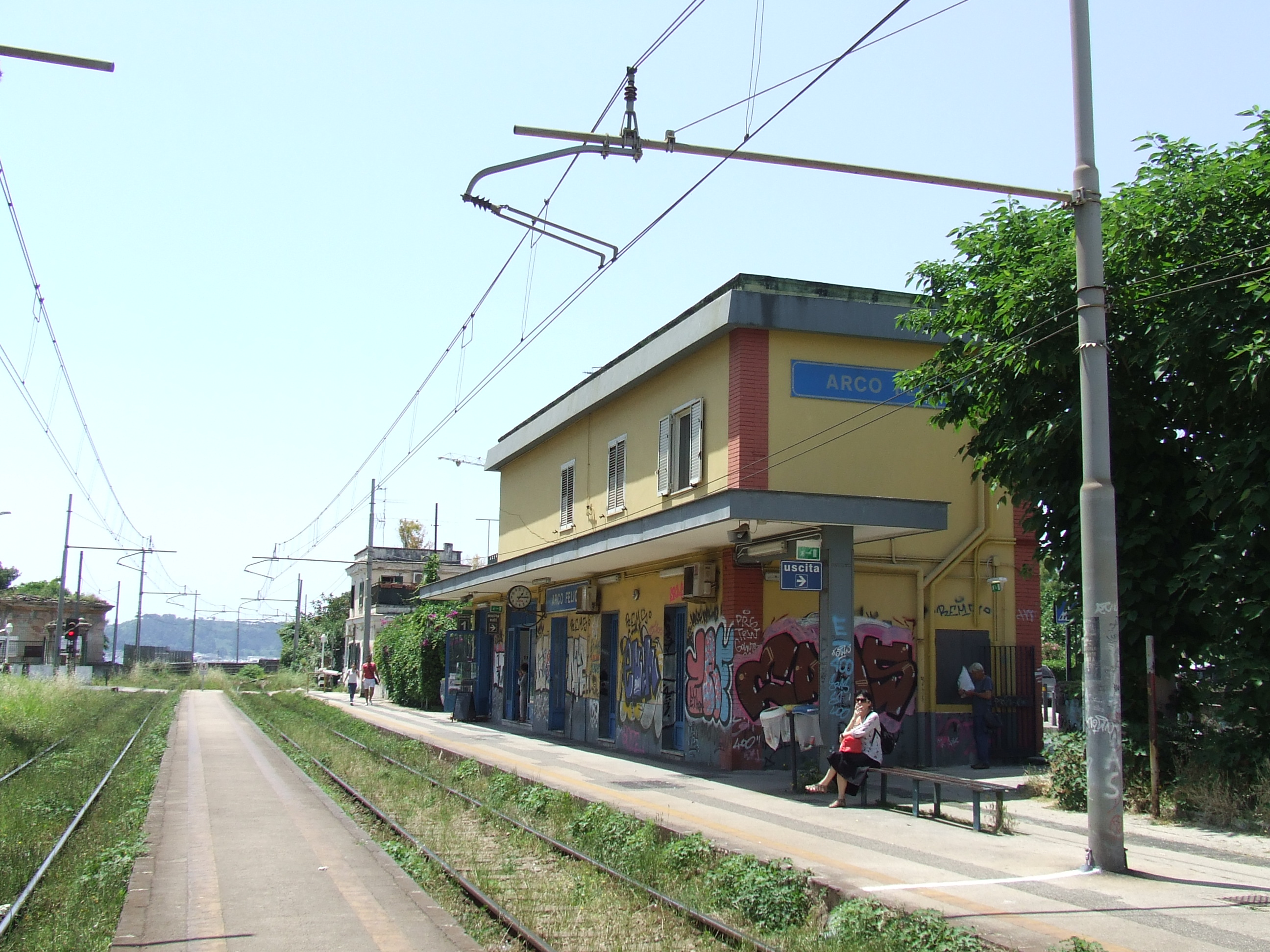

General information
- Location: Pozzuoli, Metropolitan City of Naples, Campania; Italy
- Coordinates: 40°49′58.44″N 14°06′05.4″E
- Line: Cumana
- Tracks: 2
- Train operators: EAV

History
- Opened: 16 February 1890; 136 years ago

Services
Preceding station	Naples SFM	Following station
Pozzuoli towards Montesanto	Cumana railway	Lucrino towards Torregaveta
Location
- Location within Campania Location within Italy

Arco Felice railway station (Italian: Stazione di Arco Felice) is a railway station in Pozzuoli, Metropolitan City of Naples, Italy. It is served by the Cumana railway line, managed by EAV.

== History ==
The station was inaugurated on February 16, 1890, as part of the Pozzuoli-Cuma Fusaro route.

== Passenger movement ==
The station is mostly frequented during the summer due to its proximity to beach resorts, which can already be seen from the station.

== See also ==
- List of railway stations in Campania
