= Cumana railway =

Commuter railway in Campania, Italy

Overview
- Status: Operational
- Locale: Campania, Italy

Service
- Type: Commuter rail
- System: Naples metropolitan railway service
- Operator(s): EAV

History
- Opened: 1 July 1889

Technical
- Line length: 19.81 km (12.31 mi)
- Track gauge: 1,435 mm (4 ft 8 1/2 in) standard gauge
- Electrification: 3 kV DC
Route map

Cumana railway (Italian: Ferrovia Cumana), also known as Line 4, is a commuter rail service in Campania, southern Italy, connecting Naples by two separate routes with Torregaveta, near Cuma in the town of Bacoli (about 15 km west of Naples). It passes through Pozzuoli and the volcanic Campi Flegrei area.

The line was built and run by the Società per le Ferrovie Napoletane (the Neapolitan Railway Company), founded in 1883, and is now operated by the Ente Autonomo Volturno (EAV) company.

== History ==
The line was opened on 1 July 1889 by the Società per le Ferrovie Napoletane; the route follows the coast for about 20 km from the main terminal in the populous downtown area of Montesanto to Torregaveta via the stations of Corso Vittorio Emanuele, Fuorigrotta, Mostra, Bagnoli, Pozzuoli, Arco Felice, Baia and Fusaro.

In 1927, the railway, because of the increasing commuter traffic, was electrified with a 1,2 kV DC overhead line.

In 1940, the section in the neighbourhood of Fuorigrotta was reconstructed and put underground, with the new stations of Fuorigrotta and Mostra built in rational architecture style. In the same year, the SFN gave the line to the SEPSA, a branch of the EAV.

In 1962, the electrification was elevated from 1,2 to 3 kV, and the new ET 100 EMUs were put into service.

The increasing traffic has made it necessary to double the track, beginning in 1975. The doubling of the Montesanto-Bagnoli (8.5 km) and Arco Felice-Torregaveta (5.9 km) sections have been completed and work on the remaining section (Bagnoli-Arco Felice (5.7 km)) is well under way. From 6 to 20 April 2024, the completion works will be carried out which will allow the activation of the new route of the line between Gerolomini and Arco Felice, in order to complete the doubling of the line and allow the decommissioning of the old route. On this occasion trains will be limited to the Montesanto-Fuorigrotta urban route only.

== Service ==
Trains travel every 20 minutes.

== Route ==
Cumana railway

Station	Opened	Transfers and notes
Montesanto	1889	Circumflegrea railway
Corso Vittorio Emanuele	1889	
Fuorigrotta	1889	
Mostra-Stadio Maradona	1940	
Edenlandia		
Agnano	1889	
Bagnoli-Città della Scienza	1889	
Dazio		
Gerolomini	1889	
Pozzuoli	1889 (original station); 2026 (current station)	
Arco Felice	1890	
Lucrino	1890	
Baia	1890 (original station); 2025 (current station)	
Fusaro	1890	
Torregaveta	1890	

== See also ==
- Naples metropolitan railway service
- List of suburban and commuter rail systems

== Bibliography ==
- Antonio Bertagnin: SEPSA in rinnovamento. In: ″TuttoTreno″ Nr. 150 (February 2002), pp. 14–17.
- Kalla-Bishop, P.M. (April 1966). "Through Neapolitan Suburbs: The Cumana Railway". Railway Magazine. pp. 223–226.
