= Torregaveta =

Settlement in Bacoli, Italy

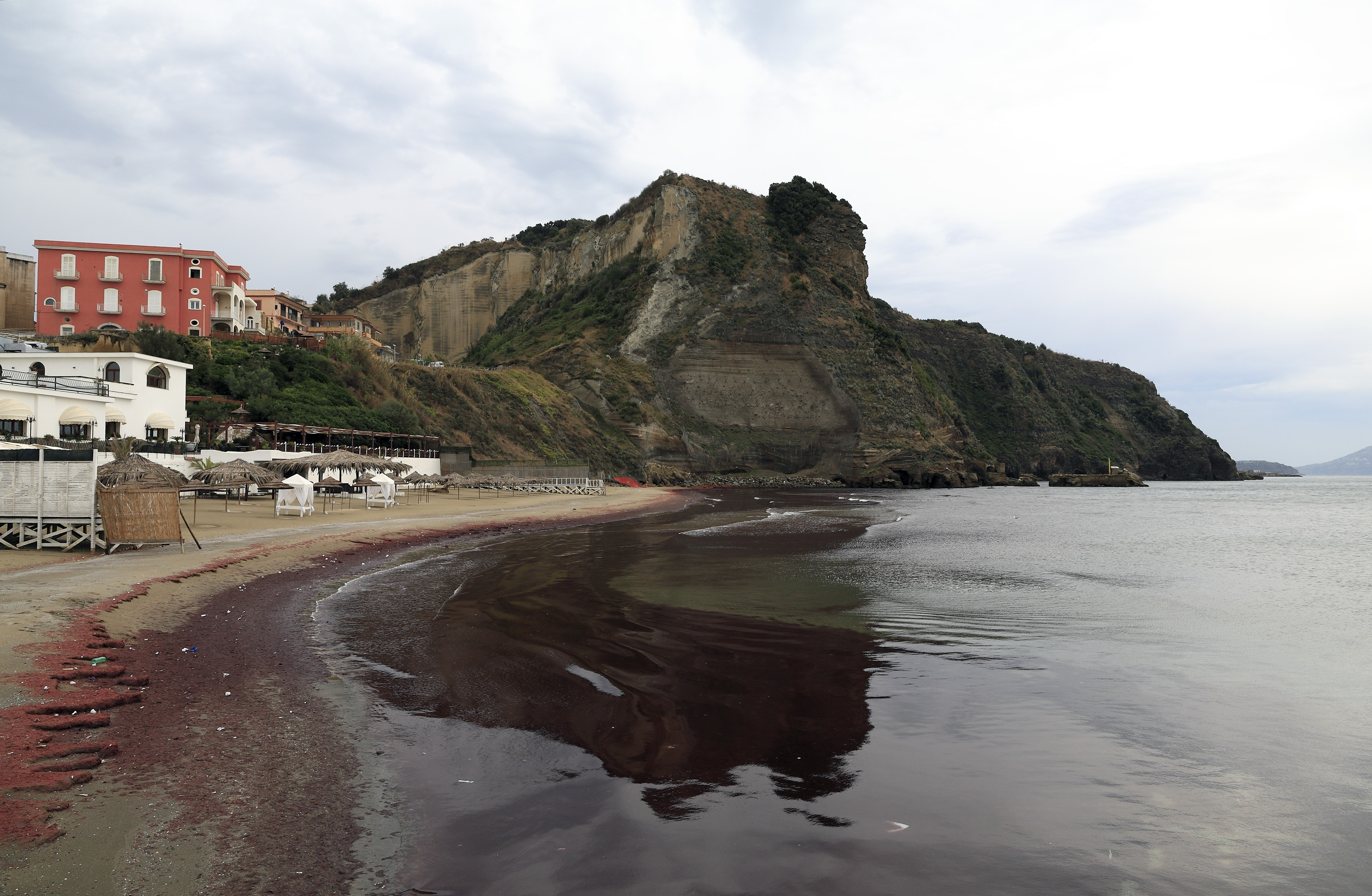
The Monte di Procida seen from Torregaveta

Torregaveta is a frazione of the Italian comune of Monte di Procida, in the metropolitan city of Naples, in Campania. It has approximately one thousand inhabitants.

== Infrastructure and transport ==
=== Railways ===
The Torregaveta railway station is the terminus for the Cumana and Circumflegrea lines, the station is equipped with four through tracks used for the passenger service.
