= Fusaro railway station =

Railway station in Bacoli, Naples, Italy

Fusaro
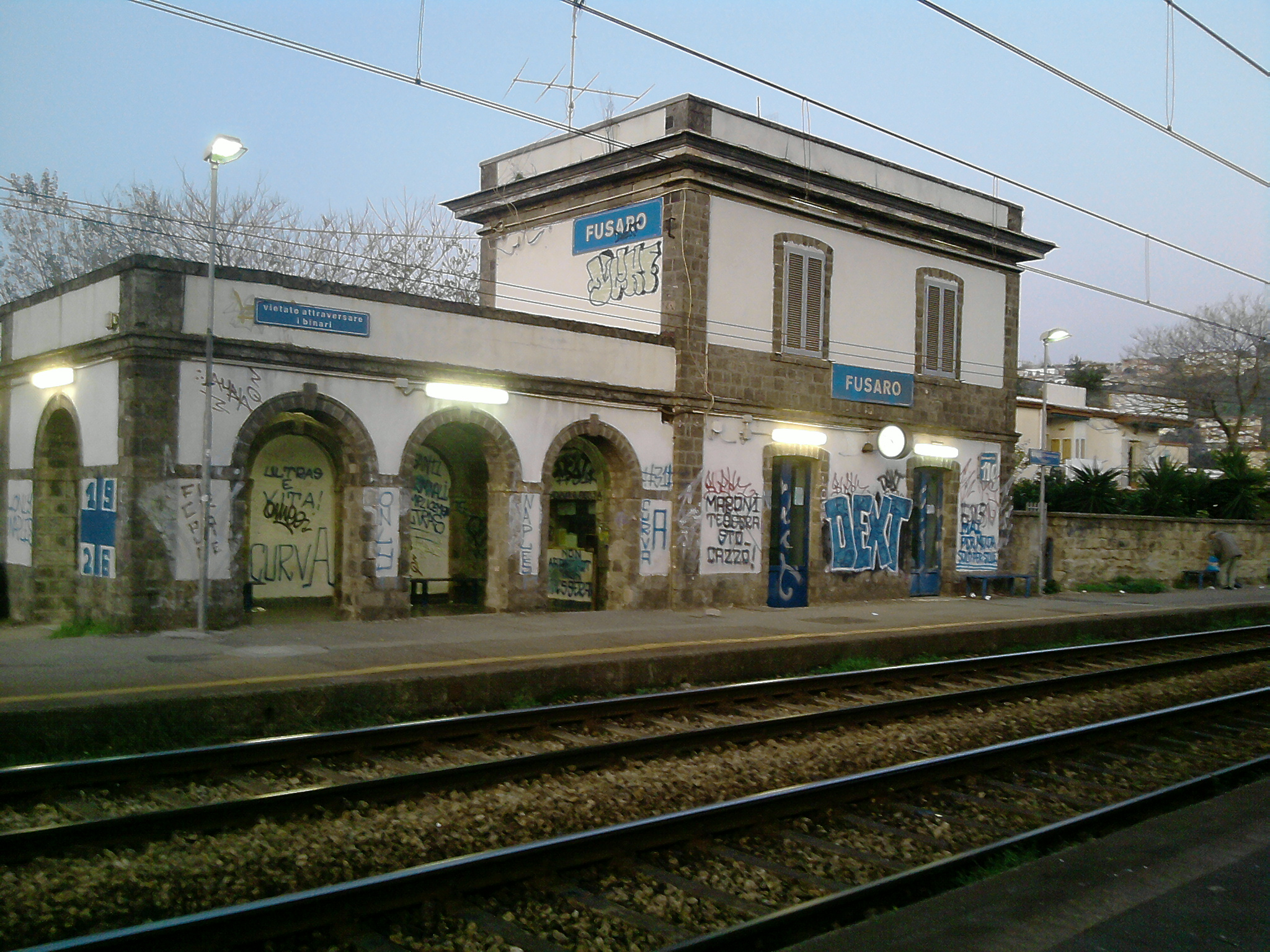

General information
- Location: Bacoli, Metropolitan City of Naples, Campania; Italy
- Coordinates: 40°49′06.6″N 14°03′42.12″E
- Line: Cumana
- Train operators: EAV

History
- Opened: 16 February 1890; 136 years ago
Location
- Location within Campania Location within Italy

Fusaro railway station is a railway station in Bacoli, Metropolitan City of Naples, Italy. It is served by the Cumana railway line, managed by EAV.

== History ==
In its early years of service, it was called Cuma Fusaro railway station. In 2020, the station underwent renovation work, including the creation of street art installations.

== Connections ==
- Bus stop

== See also ==
- List of railway stations in Campania
