= Bacoli =

Bacoli Vacule (Neapolitan)
- Comune
- Comune di Bacoli
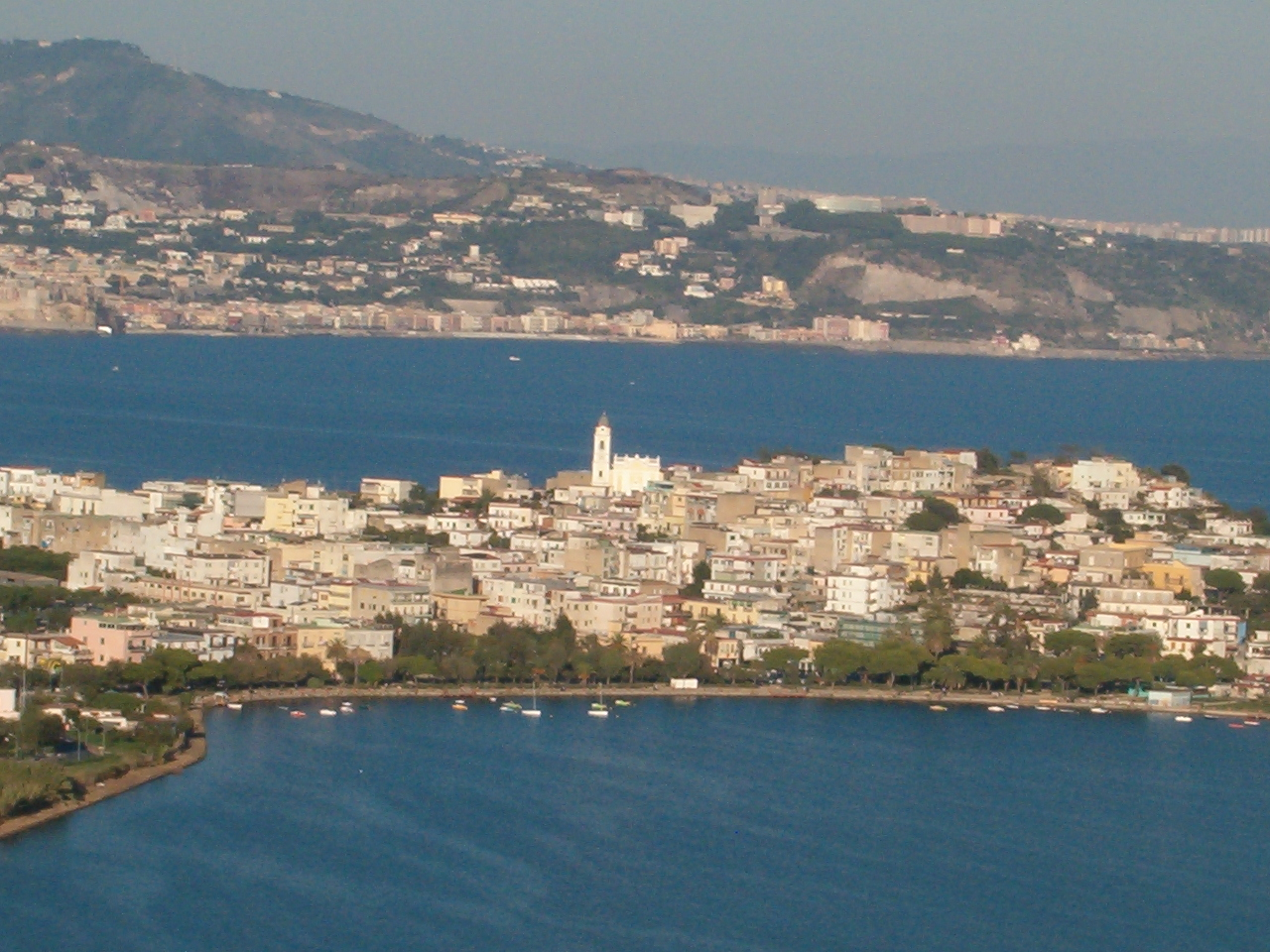
- Bacoli

- Coat of arms

- Location within Campania Location within Italy
- Coordinates: 40°48′N 14°5′E
- Country: Italy
- Region: Campania
- Metropolitan city: Naples (NA)
- Frazioni: Baia, Capo Miseno, Cappella, Cuma (partial), Faro, Fusaro, Miliscola, Miseno, Scalandrone, Torregaveta

Government
  - Mayor: Josi Gerardo Della Ragione (Freebacoli)

Area
  - Total: 13.3 km^{2} (5.1 sq mi)
- Elevation: 30 m (98 ft)

Population (28 February 2017)
  - Total: 26,413
  - Density: 1,990/km^{2} (5,140/sq mi)
- Demonym: Bacolesi
- Time zone: UTC+1 (CET)
  - Summer (DST): UTC+2 (CEST)
- Postal code: 80070
- Dialing code: 081
- Patron saint: St. Anne
- Saint day: July 26
- Website: Official website

Bacoli (Italian: [ˈbaːkoli]; Neapolitan: Vacule; Bacolese: Vàcula /ˈβ̞aːkulɐ/ or Bbacula /ˈbːaːkulɐ/ after a gemination-trigger word; Latin: Bauli) is a comune (municipality) in the Metropolitan City of Naples in the Italian region of Campania, located about 15 kilometres (9.3 mi) west of Naples.

== Geography ==
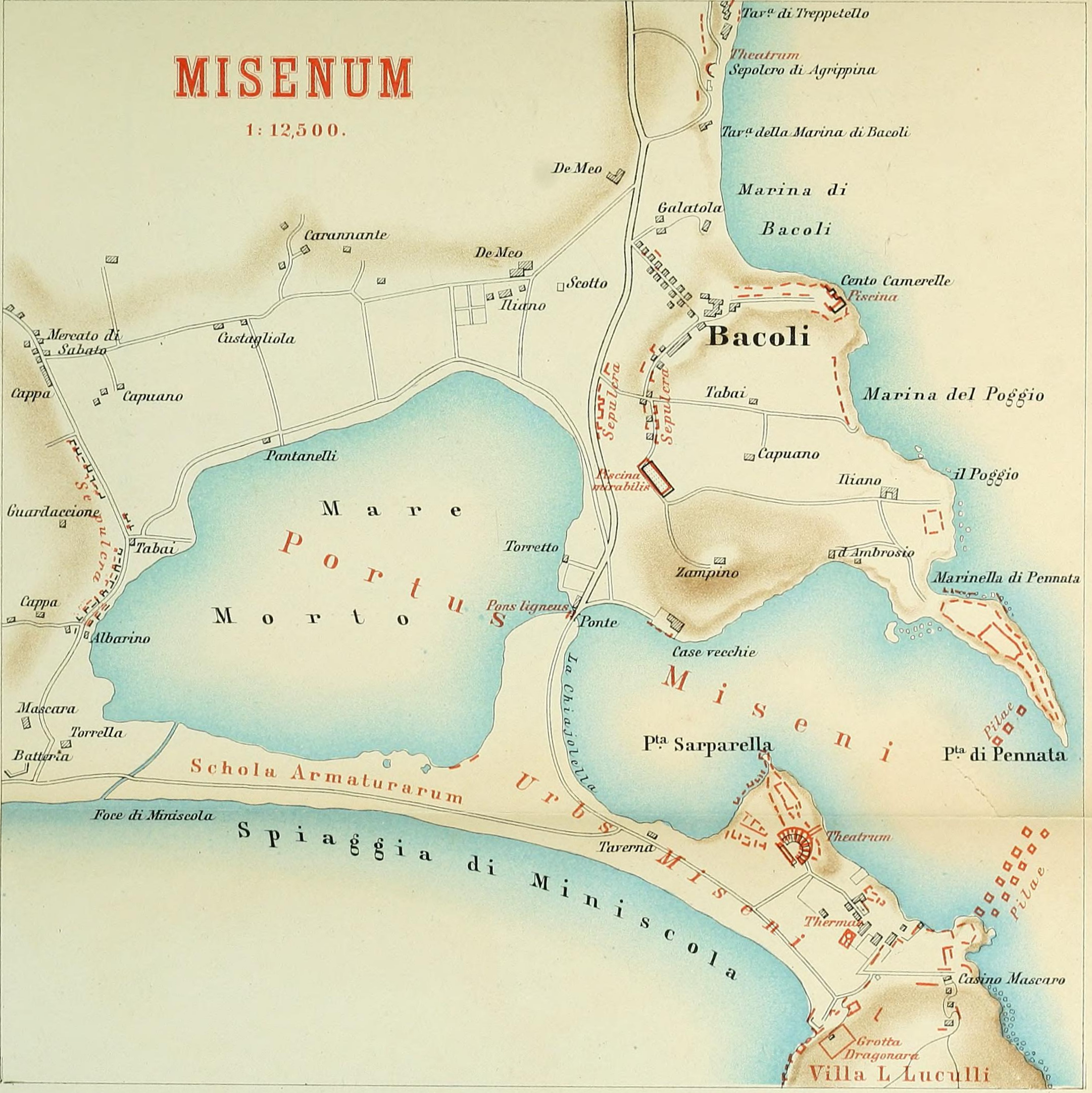
Map of Roman monuments 1890 (Beloch)

Bacoli borders the municipalities of Monte di Procida and Pozzuoli.

Its territory, of volcanic origin, is part of the Phlegraean Fields. The volcano of Cape Miseno and the Miseno port date from c. 35,000-10,500 years ago.

== History ==
Bacoli was founded by the ancient Romans in the 2nd or 1st century. BC, who called it Bauli. In Roman times it was a popular resort almost as famous as the nearby Baiae. Many luxurious villas were built on the coast there and the headland. Symmachus said of Bauli in the late 4th century. AD:

I left that place because there was a danger that if I became too fond of Bauli, all the other places I have left to see would not have pleased me.

== Main sights ==
Several major ancient Roman structures can be seen in Bacoli, including the Piscina Mirabilis, the Cento Camerelle, and the so-called Tomba Agrippina, a theatre belonging to an ancient villa.

The frazione of Cuma - Fusaro includes the site of Cumae, the first settlement in Italy by the ancient Greeks.

The archaeological remains of Baiae are also located in the commune

The frazione of Miliscola (from the Latin militum schola) was, in the Roman Empire, the seat of a military school.

== Twin towns ==
- Kymi, Greece, since 1983
- Marche region, Italy, since 2001
- Kobani, Syria, since 2015
