= Torregaveta railway station =

Railway station in Bacoli, Naples, Italy

Torregaveta
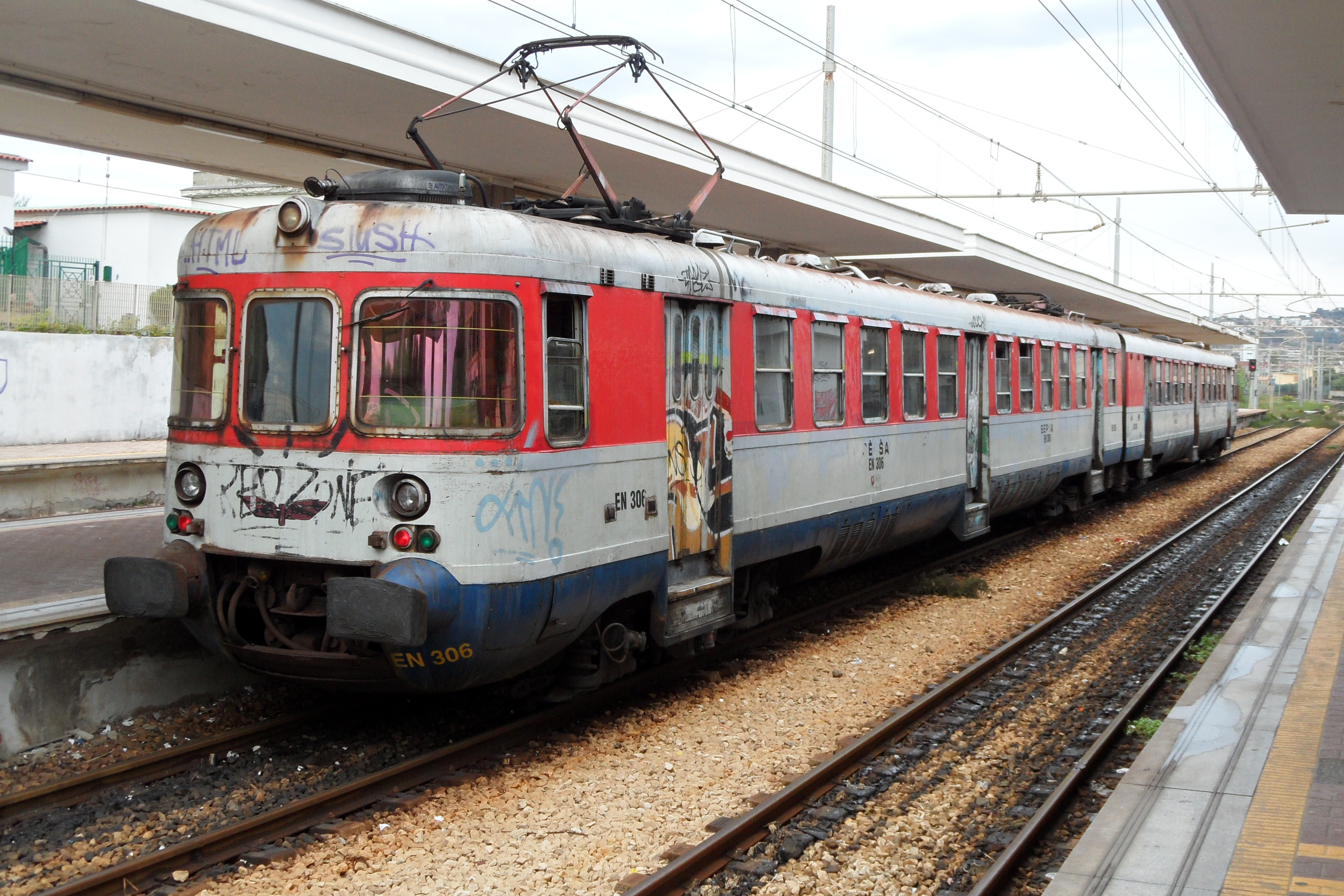
- A train stopped at the station in October 2011.

General information
- Location: Bacoli, Metropolitan City of Naples, Campania; Italy
- Coordinates: 40°48′42″N 14°02′44″E
- Line: Cumana
- Train operators: EAV

History
- Opened: 12 July 1890; 136 years ago
Location
- Location within Campania Location within Italy

Torregaveta railway station is a railway station in Torregaveta, zone of Bacoli, Metropolitan City of Naples, Italy. It is served by the Cumana and Circumflegrea railway lines, both managed by EAV.

== History ==
The station was inaugurated on July 12, 1890, as an extension from Fusaro railway station (then known as Cuma-Fusaro).

== Building ==
The terminus station of Torregaveta marks the end of both railway lines. It has four tracks, just like Montesanto railway station. The Circumflegrea railway line operates only up to Licola railway station, so the Licola-Torregaveta section is served by buses.

== Connections ==
- Bus stop

== See also ==
- List of railway stations in Campania
