= Montesanto railway station =

Railway station in Naples, Italy

Montesanto
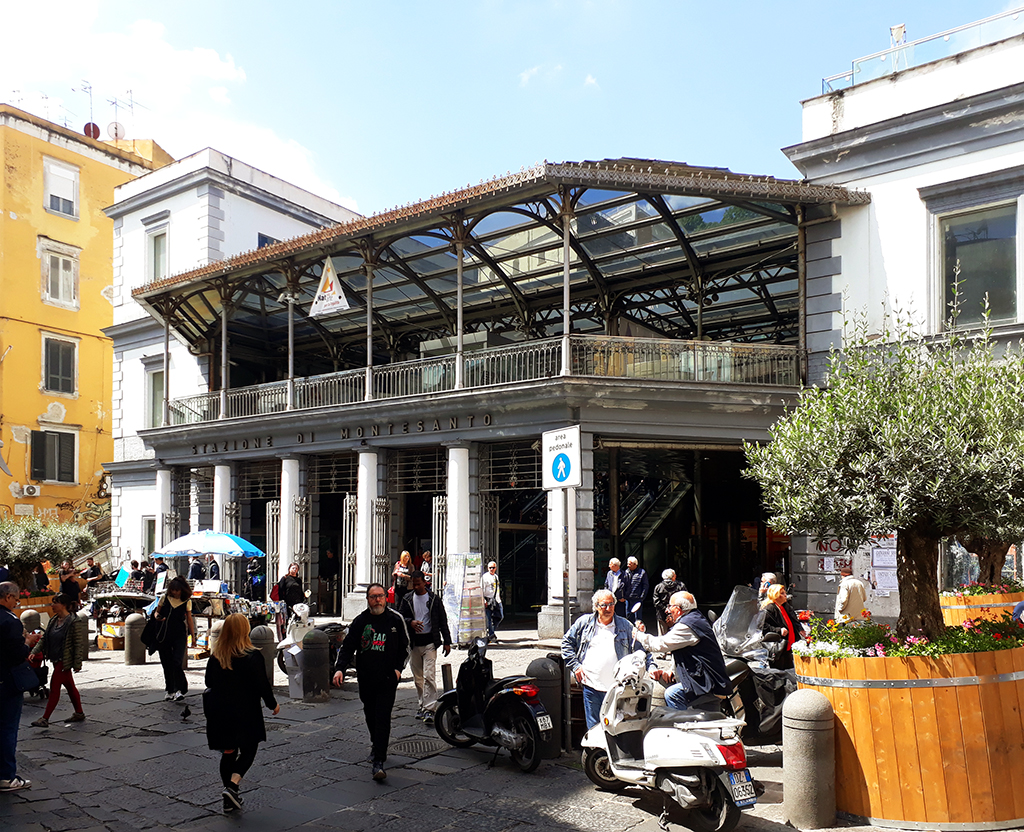

General information
- Location: Naples, Campania; Italy
- Coordinates: 40°49′21″N 14°11′41″E
- Lines: Cumana and Circumflegrea
- Train operators: EAV
- Connections: Line 2 (Napoli Montesanto)

History
- Opened: 1889; 137 years ago

Services
Preceding station	Naples SFM	Following station
Terminus	Cumana railway	Corso Vittorio Emanuele towards Torregaveta
Preceding station	Naples SFM	Following station
Terminus	Circumflegrea railway	Piave towards Licola
Route map
- Source: Italian railway atlas
- Source: Italian railway atlas
Location
- Location within Campania Location within Italy

Montesanto railway station (Italian: Stazione di Montesanto) is a railway station in Naples, Italy. It is located at the terminus of the Cumana and Circumflegrea railway lines, both managed by EAV.

== Structures and systems ==
The building, in the 1880s on a design by the engineer Antonio Liotta inspired by the liberty style, was the subject, between 2005 and 2008, of a demanding and radical restoration conceived by the neapolitan architect Silvio D'Ascia who the original structure has been completely transformed thanks to the use of large glazed surfaces (1,700 m^{2} of glass roofs) and metal members (3,500 m^{2} of stainless steel cladding).

The station has 4 tracks: the first and second are part of the Cumana railway, the third and fourth are part of the Circumflegrea railway. Both lines, after different routes, rejoin Torregaveta, the opposite terminus.

The station is directly connected to the Montesanto Funicular, while you can easily walk to the RFI station, served by the convoys of line 2, and the Dante stop of line 1.

On 25 May 2016, the station was named after Petru Birladeanu, an innocent victim of the Camorra, who was mistakenly killed in the station on 26 May 2009.

Work is underway for the construction of the Monte Sant'Angelo link road, which will make the station also the terminus of Line 7.

== Passenger movement ==
Being in the historic center of Naples, and being the terminus of the two railways, passenger traffic is very strong.

The frequency of trains is one every 20 minutes for both the Cumana railway and the Circumflegrea railway.

The station is frequented by 60,000 users daily, with a traffic of 200 trains per day. During the restoration work, the building continued to perform its function without interruption.

== Services ==
The station has:

- Ticket office
- Accessibility for handicapped people
- Bar
- Elevators
- Escalators
- Toilet

== See also ==
- List of railway stations in Campania
