= Ente Autonomo Volturno =

Public transportation company

Ente Autonomo Volturno (EAV)
- Type: Società a responsabilità limitata
- Founded: 1904
- Headquarters: Campania, Italy, Naples
- Area served: Naples, Italy, urban area and portion of suburban area
- Key people: Pietro Diamantini (Sole administrator)
- Products: Transport
- Services: Regional public transport
- Net income: 1 600 000 € (2022)
- Owner: Comune di Napoli
- Number of employees: 3 029 (2020)
- Website: www.eavsrl.it

The Ente Autonomo Volturno S.r.l., also known by the acronym EAV, is a company that operates in the sector of public transport by road, rail and cableway, in the Campania Region.

It was born in 1904 on the initiative of the municipality of Naples as an independent body for the construction and management of a hydroelectric plant on the Volturno river, completed in 1909 and operational since 1916. Subsequently the body entered various other sectors including that of public transport with the purchase, in 1931, of the Azienda Tramviaria of the Municipality of Naples. Subsequently, it performed the tasks of contracting station and group which included railway and automobile transport operators as well as cable cars, such as Circumvesuviana, MetroCampania NordEst and SEPSA. In 2012, on the initiative of the Campania Region, it incorporated the aforementioned companies, taking over the management of services as both infrastructure manager and railway company.

== Activities ==
=== Public transport ===
==== Railway services ====
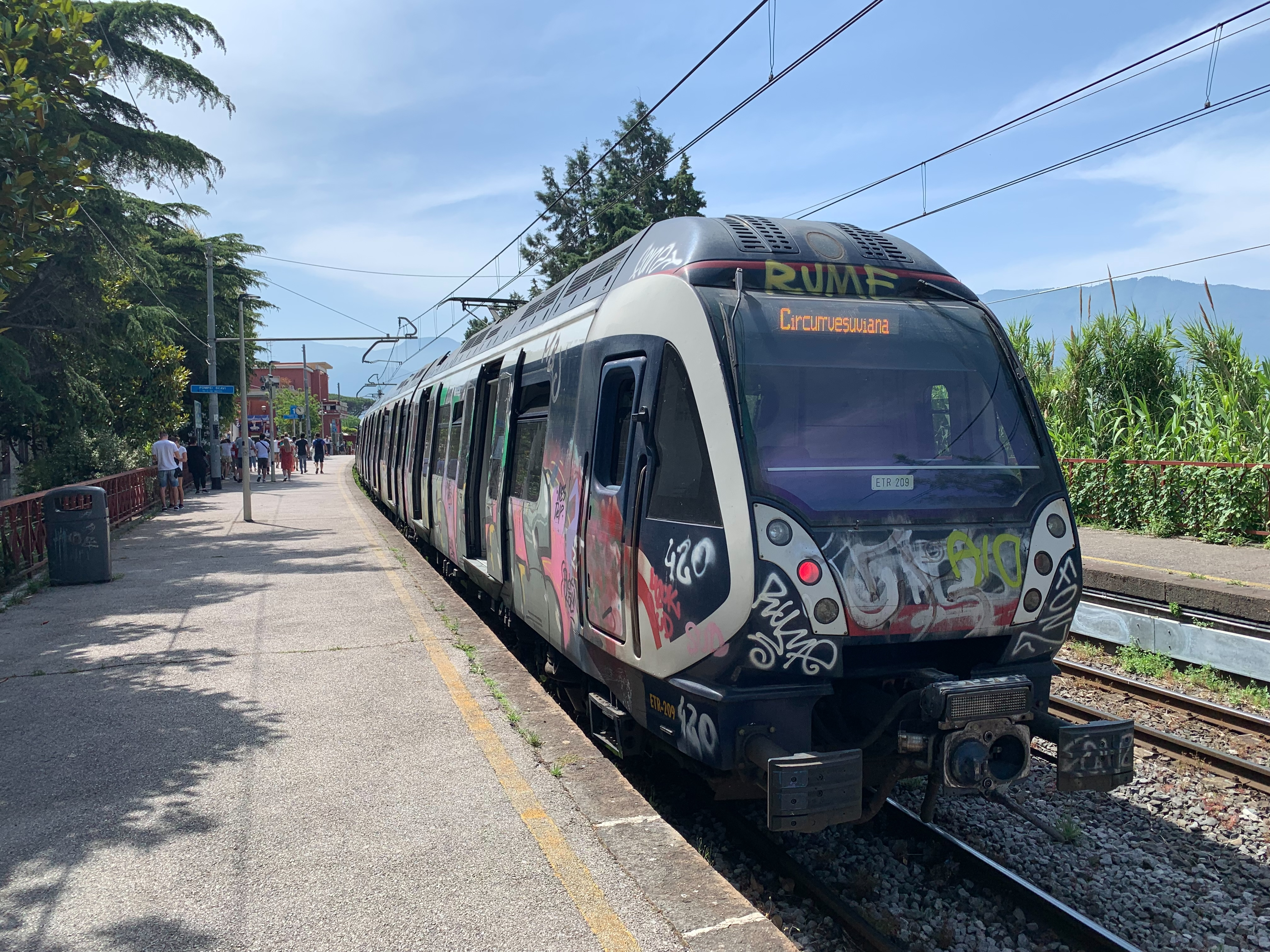
The Pompei Scavi station while a Circumvesuviana train is passing.

Ente Autonomo Volturno manages on behalf of the Campania Region, which owns it, the isolated railways Circumflegrea, Circumvesuviana and Cumana to which are added the Alifana, Benevento-Cancello railways (also called Caudina railway) and the Line 11 of Naples Metro.

The Circumvesuviana railway network includes the following sections: Botteghelle-San Giorgio a Cremano, Naples-Nola-Baiano, Naples-Ottaviano-Sarno, Naples-Pompeii-Poggiomarino, Pomigliano d'Arco-Acerra and Torre Annunziata-Sorrento. The overall length of the six relations is 142.367 km for a total extension of 203.447 km. All reports are Italian narrow gauge (950 mm); there are a total of 96 stations, with a density of one station every 1.5 km, all with railway platforms. Tourist services are also available on the network: Sorrento Express, connection between Naples and the centers of the Sorrento peninsula carried out with the first restored electromotives, Napoli Express, connection between Naples and Sorrento carried out with a more modern electric train, and the Campania Express, which connects the stations of Naples, Herculaneum, Pompeii and Sorrento with a Metrostar train. The entire Circumvesuviana network carries about 70,200 travelers a day for a total of nearly 26 million passengers a year.

The network made up of the Circumflegrea and Cumana railways boasts a total length of 47 km and connects the stations of Montesanto, in Naples, and Torregaveta, in Bacoli. It carries about 37,000 travelers a day, for a total of 13.5 million travelers a year.

Line	Service	Opening	Traction	Length (in km)	N. of stations
Alifana	Piedimonte Matese-Santa Maria Capua Vetere	1913	Diesel	41 km	15
Benevento-Cancello	Benevento-Cancello	1913	Electric	48 km	11
Botteghelle-San Giorgio a Cremano	Botteghelle-San Giorgio a Cremano	2001	Electric	8 km	7
Circumflegrea	Montesanto-Licola-Torregaveta	1962	Electric	27 km	16
Cumana	Montesanto-Pozzuoli-Torregaveta	1889	Electric	19,81 km	19
Napoli-Giugliano-Aversa	Aversa Centro-Piscinola Scampia	2005	Electric	10,5 km	5
Napoli-Nola-Baiano	Napoli Porta Nolana-Baiano	1884	Electric	38 km	28
Napoli-Ottaviano-Sarno	Napoli Porta Nolana-Sarno	1891	Electric	38 km	28
Napoli-Pompei-Poggiomarino	Napoli Porta Nolana-Poggiomarino	1904	Electric	35 km	25
Pomigliano d'Arco-Acerra	Pomigliano d'Arco-Acerra	1974	Electric	3 km	4
Torre Annunziata-Sorrento	Torre Annunziata Oplonti-Sorrento	1934	Electric	26 km	16

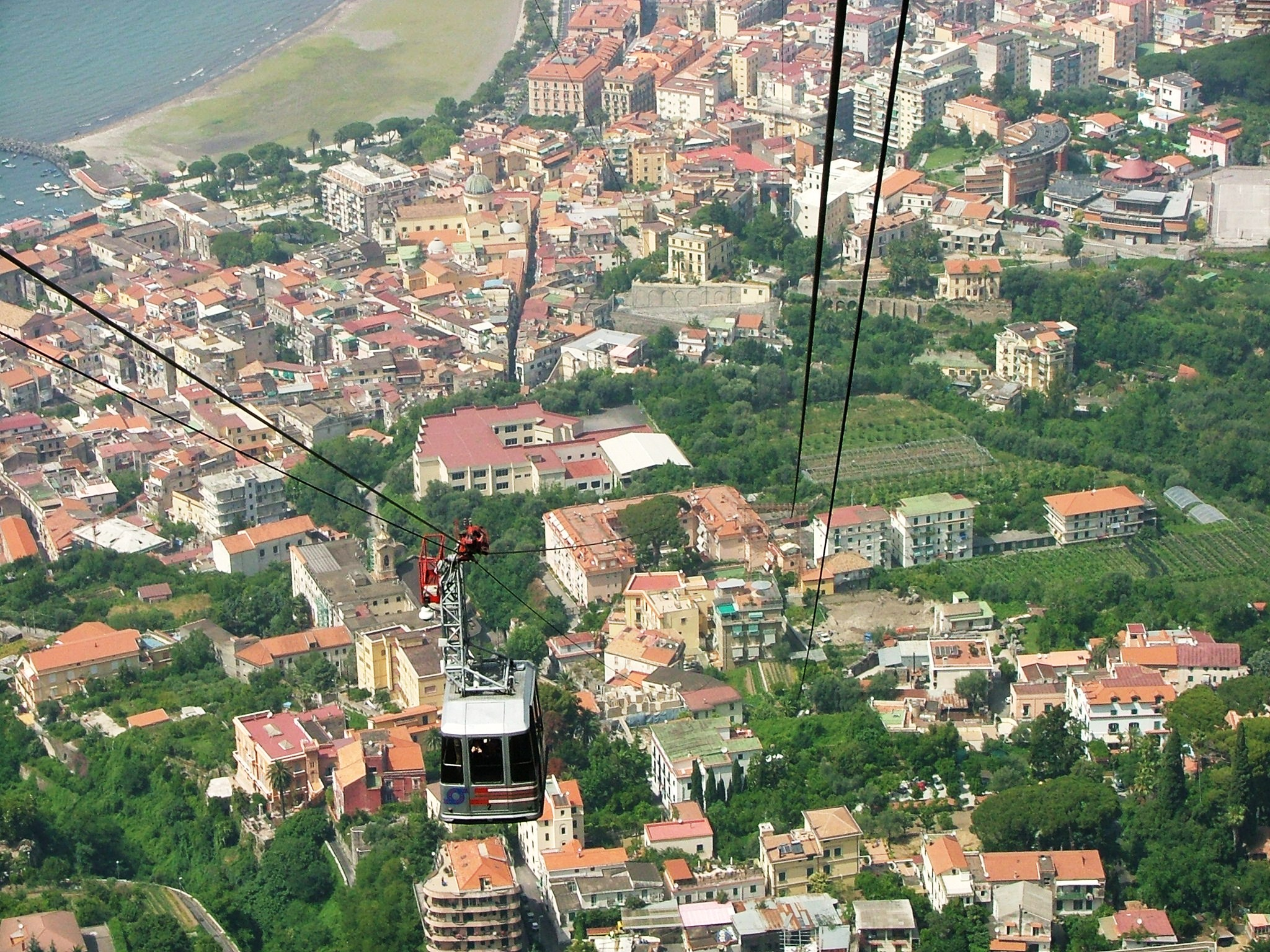
The Faito tramway going to Castellammare di Stabia.

==== Automotive services ====
===== Faito tramway =====
The Faito tramway connects the center of Castellammare di Stabia with Monte Faito in the summer period, right in the part that falls within the city of Vico Equense, in 8 minutes. The lift was opened in 1952 and completely modernized in 1990. The cableway service was suspended in 2013. The reopening, after modernization and consolidation works, initially scheduled for 25 April 2016, took place on 4 May of the same year.

== Part of the rolling stock ==
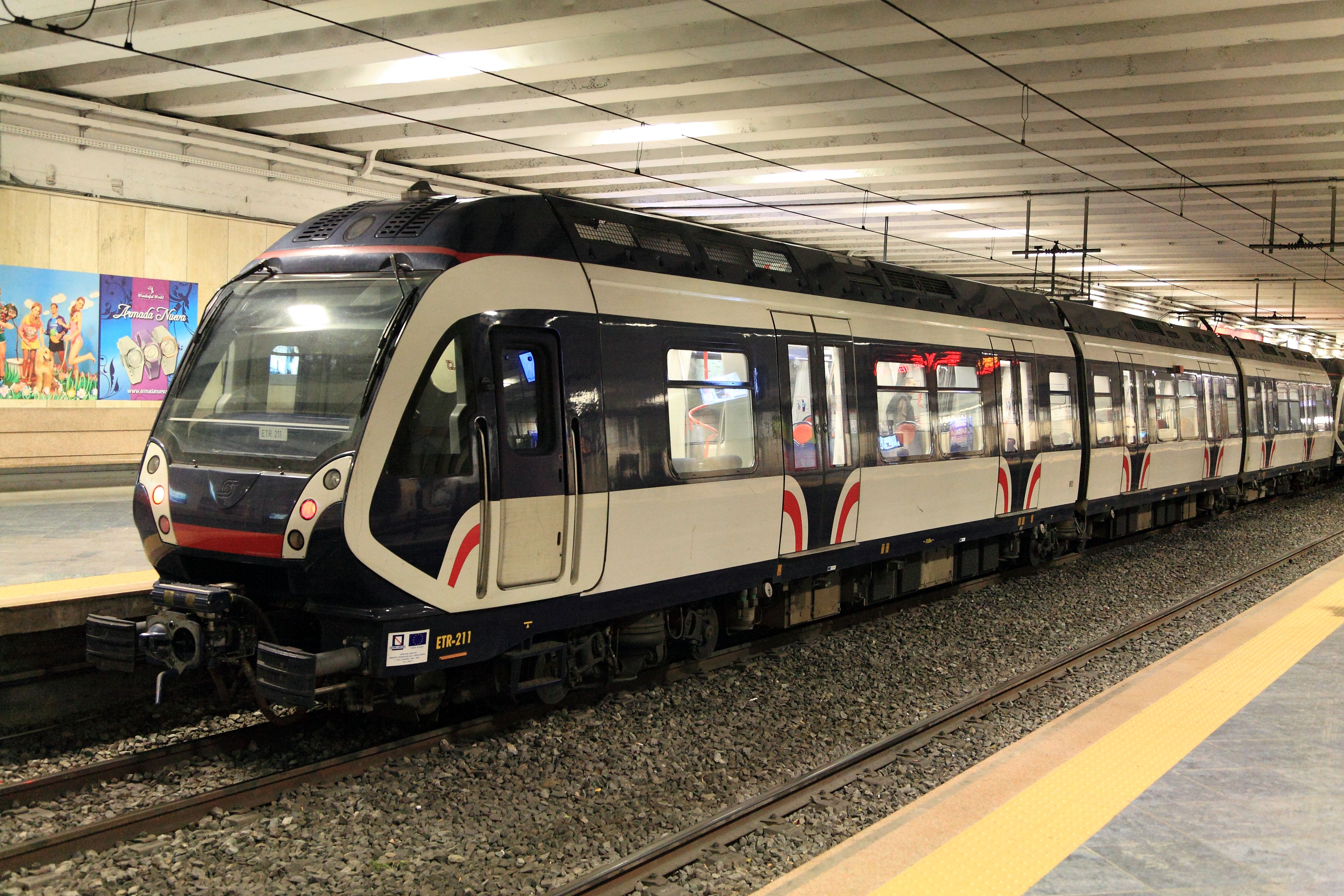
ETR 201-226

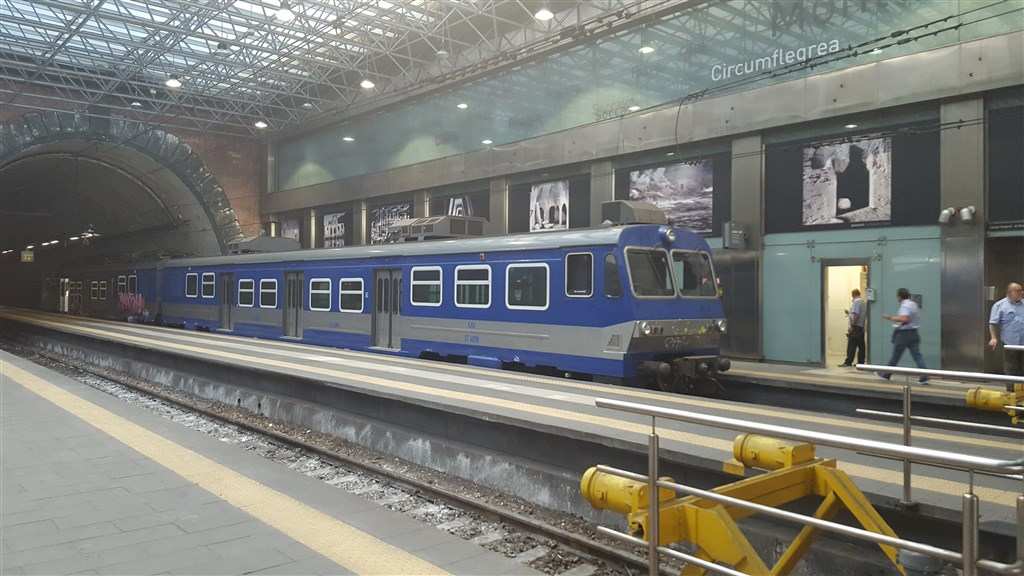
Elettrotreno EAV ET.400

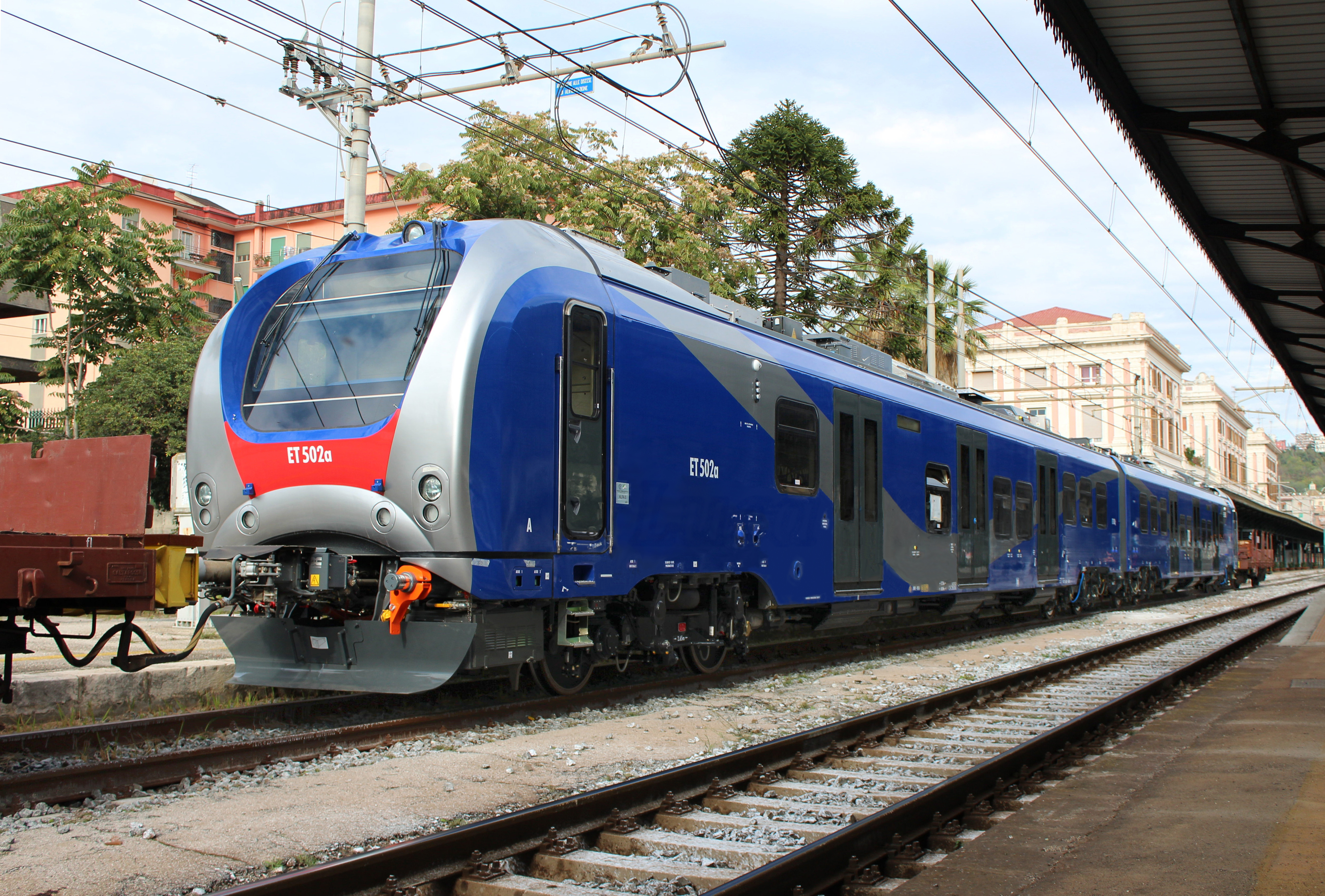
Elettrotreno EAV ET.500

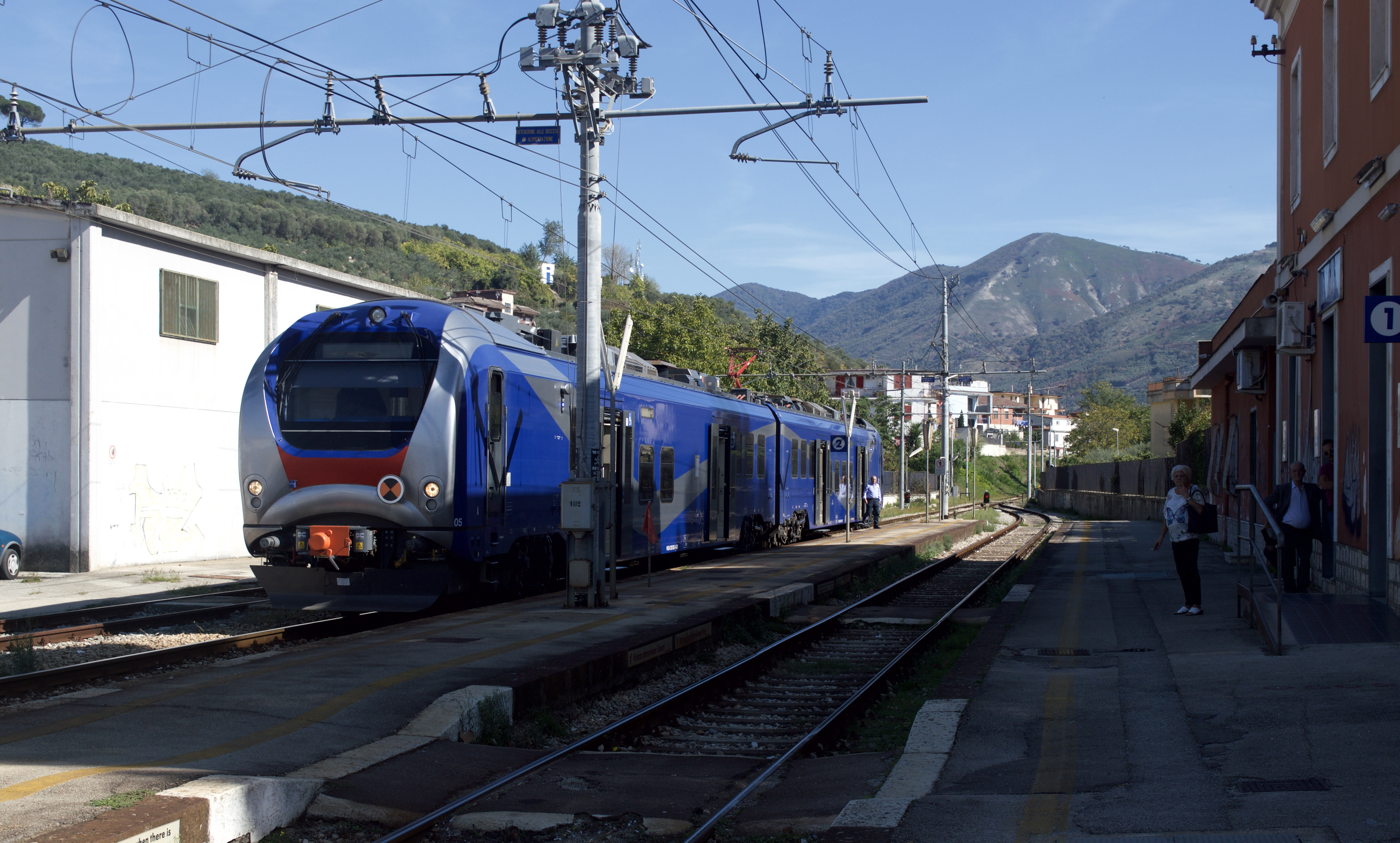
Elettrotreno EAV TFA Alfa 2
