= Barra, Naples =

Coordinates: 40°50′N 14°19′E

Barra
- Quarter of Naples
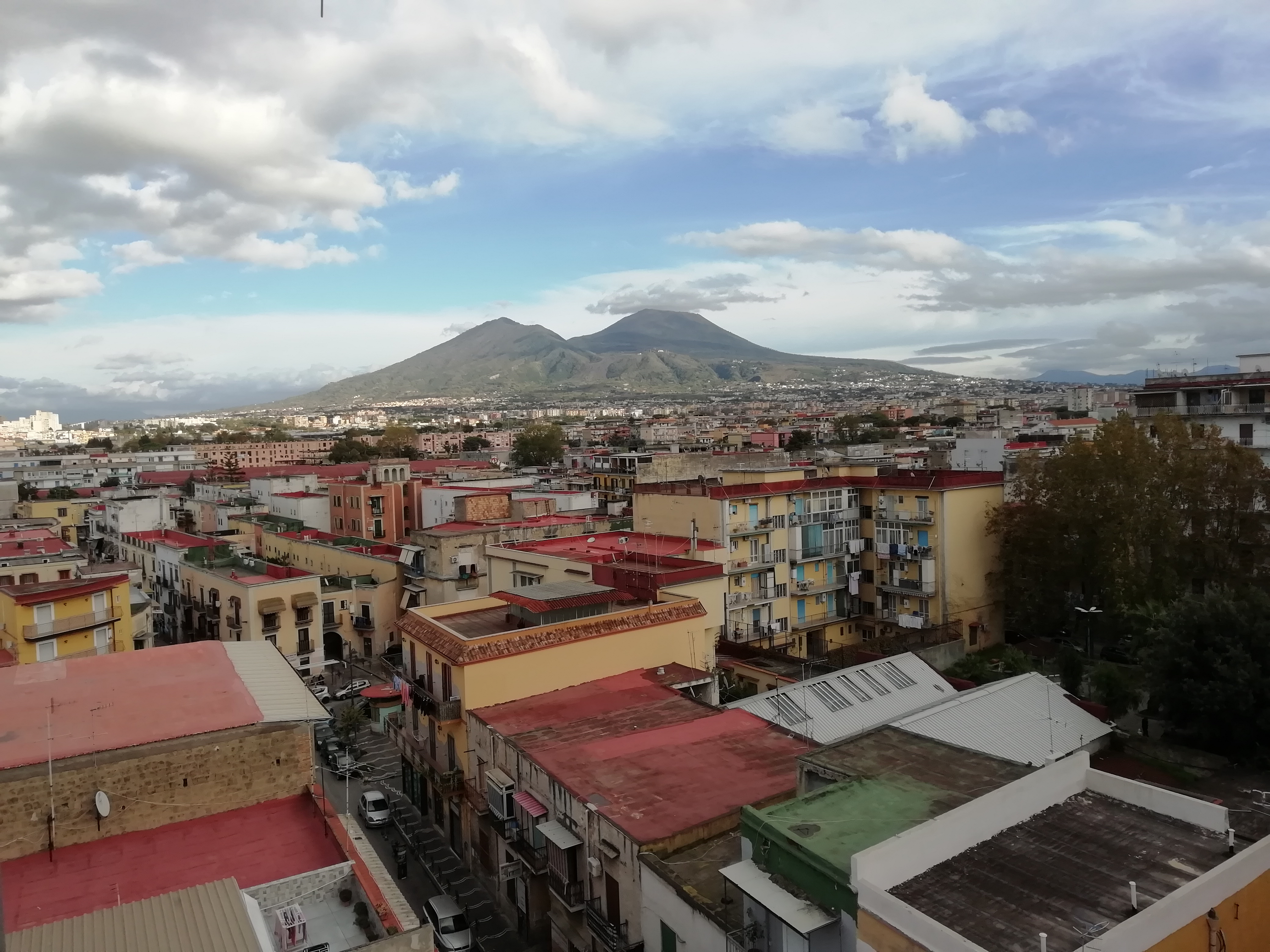

- Location of Barra within Naples
- Country: Italy
- Region: Campania
- City: Naples
- Municipalità: 6th

Area
  - Total: 7.82 km^{2} (3.02 sq mi)

Population
  - Total: 36.642
  - Density: 4.69/km^{2} (12.1/sq mi)
- Demonym: barresi
- Postal code: 80147

Barra is an eastern quarter of Naples, southern Italy, with a population of some 40,000 inhabitants (36,642 in the 2011 census).

Barra occupies the easternmost section of the territory of the comune of Naples, ranging from the sea to the slopes of Mount Vesuvius. Its territory is predominantly flat and lies at an elevation of 15 metres above sea level. It borders the quarter of Ponticelli and the comune of Cercola to the north, the comuni of San Giorgio a Cremano and San Sebastiano al Vesuvio to the east, the quarter of San Giovanni a Teduccio to the south, and the quarters of Poggioreale and Zona Industriale to the west.

== History ==
The settlement of Barra has very ancient origins: as early as the Roman period, rustic villas stood in this territory, which was highly fertile owing to its proximity to the Sebeto river.

With the fall of the Roman Empire, this territory gradually fell into abandonment, and the once-fertile land turned to marshland. In the early Middle Ages, however, this and other territories were "wrested" from the "water lavas" that had formed over the centuries, by tenacious serfs, and the territory came to be called "Tresano", which may mean either "three times wholesome" or, tracing the name to a Gallicism, "very healthy".

Already before the year 1000, two settlements had formed in this territory (not yet called casali, since they did not yet have that legal status): Sirinum and Casavaleria. As the casali took shape, these settlements acquired that status as well, and in 1275 Charles I of Anjou granted most of the territory of Tresano to the Coczi family; this casale was called Barra de Coczi because of the numerous towers present there. In 1494 the territories of Barra de Coczi and Sirinum were united.

In 1642 the territory of Casavaleria (now the area known as Santa Maria del Pozzo) was also joined to it, and at around the same time the farmers of Barra expanded their boundaries northward, reclaiming the marshy land (including part of the ancient village of Tertium, on the border with Ponticelli). This is how the "university" (self-governing community) was formed, whose main congregation was the church of Ave Gratia Plena, known as the church of St Anne, patron saint of Barra.

During the Spanish Viceroyalty, in order to avoid coming under feudal control, it remained crown property by "redeeming itself" - that is, covering the cost of remaining a Royal Casale (Casale Regio).

Between the 17th and 18th centuries, numerous noble villas were built which are still visible today in the historic centre of Barra, where the famous painter Francesco Solimena also lived; he died there in 1747 and was buried in the church of the Dominican friars, Santa Maria della Sanità, known as San Domenico, located on Corso Sirena. In the same hypogeum, opposite the altar, is the tomb slab of the noblewoman Maria Camilla Cantelmo Stuart di Tocco, Princess of Pettorano and Duchess of Popoli, who died in Barra on 24 September 1750. Beside this slab can be seen another commemorating restoration work funded by the aforementioned noblewoman's great-great-nephew, Francesco Maria di Tocco Cantelmo Stuart. Also buried here is Federigo Zuccari, inventor and founder of the Astronomical Observatory of Capodimonte. In the last months of his life, the astronomer lived in Barra in the house of Angelo Cheibis. He died on 15 December 1817, attended by his friend, the zoologist Giosuè Sangiovanni, and receiving the last rites from Father Gaetano Ascione. At his own wish he was buried in the church of San Domenico in Barra.

The festa dei Gigli dates back to 1822; brought from Nola, it was instituted so that the wooden obelisks would not be carried during the feast of Saint Anne.

Of Bourbon loyalty, it did not take part in the plebiscite of 1860. The "risanamento" (redevelopment) works, similar to those carried out in the historic centre, date to 1890, along with the resulting construction of Corso Bruno Buozzi, Piazza De Franchis and Corso 4 Novembre.

The two-tailed siren surmounted by a crown was the ancient coat of arms of the formerly autonomous comune of Barra, autonomous until 1925, when it was later annexed to the Comune of Naples - although as early as 1918, owing to the presence of the refinery in the northern part of the comune, that area had already been annexed to the Comune of Naples.

…in the totality of the two "universities", under the name of Sirena and SIRENA VESUVIANA… for the ancient little village of Sirena, the original embryo of the present single settlement, will shortly also have its own water from the Serino aqueduct through the gate siphons, if it could not have it once, when the delights recalled to us by Strabo were still spread out here, from the aqueduct of the Roman emperor, and it will then have become, beyond compare, the most charming and most economical summer residence on the majestic flanks of Queen Parthenope, equal to one of her faithful and dearest handmaidens!

— Pasquale Cozzolino, La Barra e sue origini, 1899

Affected from the late 1940s by the growth of worker and public housing, and from the late 1950s also by residential development, after the 1970s - and especially after the 1980 Irpinia earthquake - it fell, like the whole eastern periphery, into civic, administrative and cultural decline.

Until 2005 it was the 19th circoscrizione of the Comune of Naples; then, with the city's administrative reform (resolutions No. 13 of 10 February 2005, No. 15 of 11 February, No. 21 of 16 February, No. 29 of 1 March, and No. 68, of the Naples city council), the Municipalities of Naples were established, and Barra, together with the quarters of Ponticelli and San Giovanni a Teduccio, forms the 6th Municipality of Naples.

== Bibliography ==
- Pasquale Cozzolino, La Barra e sue origini, Napoli 1889.
- Nicola Lapegna, Origini e storia di Barra, Napoli 1929.
- Vittorio Gleijeses, La storia di Napoli, Napoli 1977.
- Cesare De Seta, I casali di Napoli, Bari 1984.
- Pompeo Centanni, Il nobile casale della Barra, Napoli 1997.
- Comune di Napoli - Assessorato all'Identità, cultura e promozione dell'immagine, Per una guida turistica di Barra, Napoli 1997/98.
- Pompeo Centanni, Angelo Renzi, La Repubblica Napoletana del 1799 e il casale della Barra, Edizioni Magna Graecia, Napoli 1999.
- Angelo Renzi, Barra (Ristampa e approfondimenti di due documenti sulla storia di Barra), Edizioni Magna Graecia, Napoli 1999.
- Raffaele Ciaravolo, La storia di Barra, Napoli 2000.
- Anna Ferrara, Le Chiese e le ville vesuviane di Barra, Edizioni Magna Graecia, Napoli 2000.
- Tommaso Lomonaco, Barra: da Comune a Circoscrizione, Edizioni Magna Graecia, Napoli 2004.
- Romano Marino, La sirena racconta, Napoli 2003.
- Romano Marino, Tradizionale Festa dei Gigli di Barra 1800-2000 Vol.I 1800-1954, Napoli 2004.
- Romano Marino, Le strade di Barra, Napoli 2004.
- Romano Marino, Tradizionale Festa dei Gigli di Barra 1800-2000 Vol.II 1955-2000, Napoli 2005.
- Raffaele Ciaravolo, Sirinum, Casabalera e Barra de' Coczis, Napoli 2006.
- Romano Marino, Cari paesani, Napoli 2007.
- Romano Marino, Barra da riscoprire e... altre storie, Napoli 2008.
- Romano Marino, Barra un Comune... dentro la città, Napoli 2010
