= Fino al mare =

Italian comedy short film

- Directed by: Daniele G. De Stefano; Pasquale Fresegna
- Written by: Noemi Perfetto; Pasquale Fresegna; Francesco Izzo; Daniele G. De Stefano; Mario Donato Pilla; Santa Verde; Ottavio Gelone; Roberto Todisco
- Produced by: Martina Romanello; Roberto Todisco
- Music by: Francesco Izzo; Mario Donato Pilla; Ottavio Gelone
- Release date: 2022
- Running time: 9 minutes
- Country: Italy
- Language: Italian

Fino al mare (lit. 'To the sea') is a 2022 Italian comedy short film directed by Daniele G. De Stefano and Pasquale Fresegna. It stars Noemi Perfetto as Arianna, Ilaria Cerere as Princess Theodosia and Mario Di Donna as The Orge. The story uses the Theseus and Ariadne myth to describe San Giovanni a Teduccio, the only coastal suburb of Naples where the sea is almost invisible.

== Plot ==
Arianna works as rider for Il Filo, delivering packages for the unusual characters that live in the maze of streets of San Giovanni a Teduccio: a forgotten princess, a dreamy pirate and a worker orge.

== Cast ==
- Noemi Perfetto as Arianna
- Mario Di Donna as the Orge
- Ilaria Cecere as Princess Theodosia
- Gennaro Pilla as Trucchetto
- Ottavio Gelone as the Pirate
- Alessio Ferrara as the Centaur
- Carlo Di Vivo as Arianna's son

== Production ==
=== Development and filming ===
The film was produced by Art. 33 - Cultural Hub, an association that operates in south-east Naples with the help of the Ministry of Culture. Initially, the film was supposed to be a documentary on the history and contradictions of the Municipality, the core of "San Giovanni tra fuoco e mare" project. However, after two weeks of touring the neighborhood and brainstorming in the artist residence, the idea of a fictional short prevailed. The filming phase was postponed from September 2020 to Spring 2021.

=== Locations ===
It was filmmed across different Naples and San Giorgio a Cremano landscapes including the Jorit's Diego Maradona graffiti in Taverna del Ferro, the Vigliena fortress, Parco Massimo Troisi and the Villa Pignatelli.

== Reception ==
The University of Naples Federico II awarded Fino al mare as best short film at 27th Premio Penisola Sorrentina. In the same year it was distributed on ON, the video platform of Teatro di San Carlo. Since 2022 it was selected in 19 festival across the globe, winning 14 different awards.

== Accolades ==
Awards and nominations of Fino al mare (2022)
Festival	Year	Award	Result	Ref.
Benevento Cinema Televisione	2022	Best Short Film	Nominated	
Premio Penisola Sorrentina	2022	Best Short Film "Racconti di mare"	Won	
Marano Ragazzi Spot Festival	2022	International Youth Contest Italia	Nominated	
Tulipani di Seta Nera	2023	Sorriso RAI Cinema Award	Nominated	
Tulipani di Seta Nera	2023	Sorriso Anmil Award	Nominated	
Student World Impact Film Festival	2023	Best Short Film	Nominated	
Giffoni School Experience	2025	Short Experience +11	Nominated	
