= Maria Grazia Tarallo =

Blessed Maria Grazia Tarallo CAE
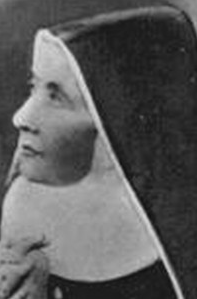
- Maria della Passione Tarallo

Nun, Mystic
- Born: 23 September 1866; Barra, Naples, Kingdom of Italy
- Died: 27 July 1912 (aged 45); San Giorgio a Cremano, Naples, Kingdom of Italy
- Venerated in: Roman Catholic Church
- Beatified: 14 May 2006, Naples, Italy by Cardinal José Saraiva Martins
- Feast: 27 July
- Attributes: Nun's habit; Scapular
- Patronage: Crucified Sisters Adorers of the Holy Eucharist; Against demonic possessions

Maria Grazia Tarallo, CAE (in religion, Maria of the Passion of Our Lord Jesus Christ; 23 September 1866 – 27 July 1912) was an Italian Catholic member of the Crucified Sisters Adorers of the Holy Eucharist. She was well known for her charitable nature as well as her strong devotion to the Eucharist.

Tarallo was beatified in Naples in 2006. Cardinal José Saraiva Martins presided over the celebration on behalf of Pope Benedict XVI.

== Life ==
Maria Grazia Tarallo was born on 23 September 1866 in Naples to Leopoldo Tarallo and Concetta Borriello; she was the second of seven children. Tarallo was baptized on 24 September 1866. She received a Christian education and at the age of five had even made private vows at the foot of a statue of the Mother of God in the church of Ave Gratia Plena to remain a virgin. She made her First Communion at the age of seven (7 April 1873) and received confirmation at the age of ten; she received First Communion so soon because her parish priest deemed her prepared enough to take the sacrament.

Tarallo felt drawn to religious life and decided at the age of 22 to enter a convent despite the opposition of her parents who desired her to consider marriage. Such a man – Raffaele Aruta – indeed proposed to her but died of tuberculosis before a wedding could be planned.

She entered the convent of the Sisters Crucified Adorers of the Eucharist in Barra on 1 June 1891 and assumed the name of "Maria of the Passion of Our Lord Jesus Christ" upon her solemn profession on 20 November 1892. She was a student of Maddalena Rosa Notari – a future Servant of God – and served as a novice mistress and spiritual guide to the sisters. She also worked in the kitchen, laundry, and as porter. She is believed to have been granted the gift to receive prophetic visions, which she used to help guide her sisters and others.

In 1894 she established a home in Salerno and another close to Naples to spread the work of the sisters. Tarallo died in 1912.

== Veneration ==
The beatification process commenced in Naples under Pope Pius X in 1913 in a process that spanned until 1918. Tarallo's spiritual writings were approved by theologians on 27 July 1921. The formal introduction for the cause came on 14 March 1928 under Pope Pius XI – this granted her the title Servant of God. Both processes were given the formal decree of ratification so that the cause could proceed to the next level for further evaluation in 1937.

However the Positio – documents on her life and virtues – was not given to the Congregation for the Causes of Saints in Rome until 1995. It allowed Pope John Paul II to proclaim her to be Venerable on 19 April 2004 after he had recognized her life of heroic virtue.

The miracle required for beatification was investigated and ratified on 10 October 1995. It received the formal approval of Pope Benedict XVI on 19 December 2005 and allowed for her beatification in 2006.
