= 45th Signal Regiment (Italy) =

Italian Army signal unit

- 45° Reggimento Trasmissioni
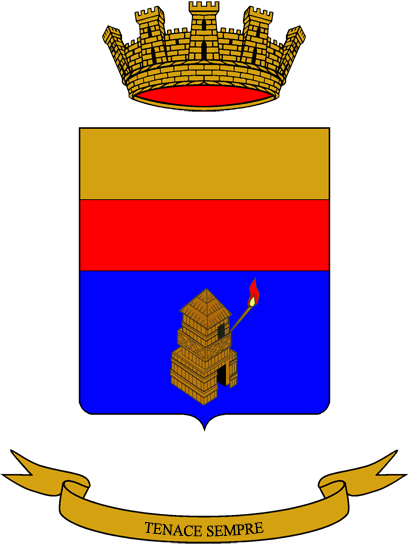
- Regimental coat of arms
- Active: 1 Oct 1975 — 31 Dec. 2000
- Country: Italy
- Branch: Italian Army
- Role: Military signals
- Part of: 46th Signal Regiment
- Garrison/HQ: Nocera Inferiore
- Motto(s): "Tenace sempre"
- Anniversaries: 20 June 1918 - Second Battle of the Piave River

Insignia
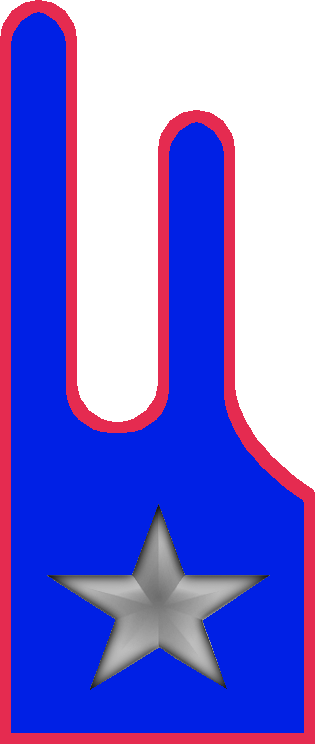
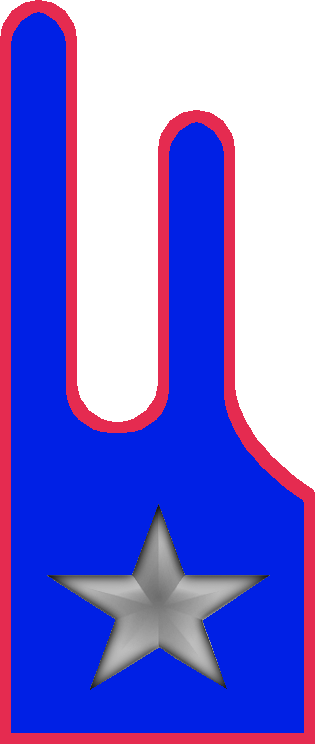
- Signallers gorget patches

The 45th Signal Regiment (Italian: 45° Reggimento Trasmissioni) is an signals regiment of the Italian Army. The unit was formed as a battalion in 1957 and operated the army's telecommunications network in the Apulia, Basilicata, Calabria, Campania and Molise regions. In 1975, the battalion was named for Monte Vulture and received its own flag. In 1993, the battalion lost its autonomy and entered the newly formed 45th Signal Regiment. In 2001, the 45th Signal Regiment was disbanded and the Signal Battalion "Vulture" transferred to the 46th Signal Regiment. The regiment's anniversary falls, as for all signal units, on 20 June 1918, the day the Austro-Hungarian Army began its retreat across the Piave river during the Second Battle of the Piave River.

== History ==
=== Cold War ===
On 1 October 1957, the XLV Signal Battalion was formed in Bagnoli with the personnel and materiel of the existing 9th Territorial Signal Company in Bari and the 10th Territorial Signal Company in Bagnoli. The battalion consisted of a command, a command and services platoon, and three signals companies. The battalion was assigned to the X Territorial Military Command in Naples. On 1 August 1971, the battalion moved from Bagnoli to Naples.

During the 1975 army reform the army disbanded the regimental level and newly independent battalions were granted for the first time their own flags. During the reform signal battalions were renamed for mountain passes. On 1 October 1975, the XLV Signal Battalion was renamed to 45th Signal Battalion "Vulture". The battalion was named for the extinct volcano Monte Vulture. This made the battalion, together with the 46th Signal Battalion "Mongibello", only one of two Italian Army signal battalions not named for an Alpine or Apennine mountain pass. After the reform the battalion consisted of a command, a command and services platoon, and two signal companies. The battalion was assigned to the Southern Military Region's Signal Command and operated the army's telecommunications network in the Apulia, Basilicata, Calabria (minus the province of Reggio Calabria), Campania and Molise regions. On 12 November 1976, the President of the Italian Republic Giovanni Leone granted with decree 846 the battalion a flag.

On 1 September 1984, the battalion was reorganized and consisted afterwards of a command, a command and services company, the 1st TLC Infrastructure Managing Company, and the 2nd TLC Infrastructure Managing Company, which was detached to Bari. On 1 January 1985, the battalion added the 3rd Field Support Company. On 2 April 1991, the battalion moved from Naples to San Giorgio a Cremano. On 1 June of the same year, the 2nd TLC Infrastructure Managing Company moved from Bari to San Giorgio a Cremano.

=== Recent times ===
On 15 September 1993, the 45th Signal Battalion "Vulture" lost its autonomy and the next day the battalion entered the newly formed 45th Signal Regiment as Signal Battalion "Vulture". On the same day the flag of the 45th Signal Battalion "Vulture" was transferred from the battalion to the 45th Signal Regiment. The newly formed regiment continued to operate the army's telecommunications network in southern Italy.

On 4 May 1998, the battalion's command and the 2nd TLC Infrastructure Managing Company moved from San Giorgio a Cremano to Nocera Inferiore. On 1 June 1999, the Signal Speciality left the Italian Army's Engineer Arm and was elevated to Signal Arm. On 31 December 2000, the 45th Signal Regiment was disbanded and the next day the Signal Battalion "Vulture" joined the 46th Signal Regiment, which at the time operated the army's telecommunications network on the island of Sicily. Since then the 46th Signal Regiment operates the army's telecommunications network in all of southern Italy and on Sicily. Subsequently, the flag of the 45th Signal Regiment was transferred to the Shrine of the Flags in the Vittoriano in Rome for safekeeping.

== Organization ==
As of 2024 the Signal Battalion "Vulture" is organized as follows:

- Signal Battalion "Vulture", in Nocera Inferiore
  - Command and Logistic Support Company
  - 3rd Signal Company — Area Support
  - 4th Signal Company — C4 Systems Center
