= 46th Signal Regiment (Italy) =

Active Italian Army signal unit

- 46° Reggimento Trasmissioni
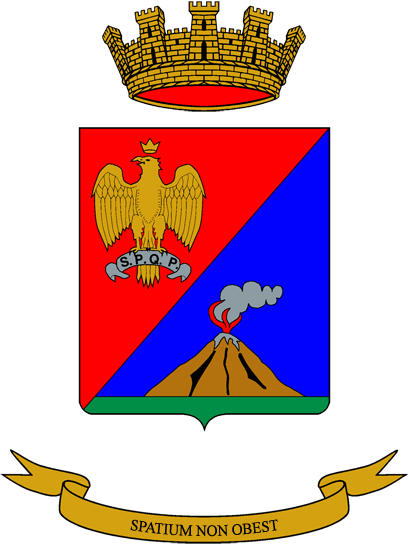
- Regimental coat of arms
- Active: 1 May 1976 — today
- Country: Italy
- Branch: Italian Army
- Role: Military signals
- Part of: Signal Command
- Garrison/HQ: Palermo
- Motto(s): "Spatium non obest"
- Anniversaries: 20 June 1918 - Second Battle of the Piave River
- Decorations: 1× Bronze Cross of Army Merit

Insignia
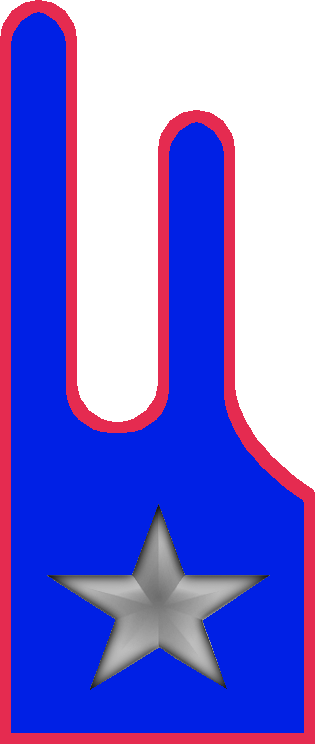
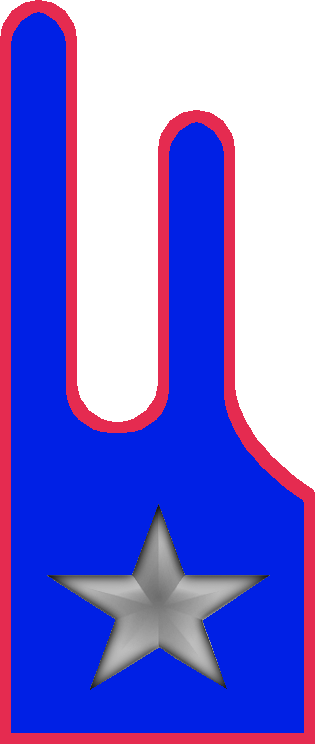
- Signallers gorget patches

The 46th Signal Regiment (Italian: 46° Reggimento Trasmissioni) is a national support signals regiment of the Italian Army based in Palermo in Sicily and Nocera Inferiore in Campania. The unit was formed as a battalion in 1976 and named for Mount Mongibello. At the time the battalion operated the army's telecommunications network on the island of Sicily. In 1997, the battalion lost its autonomy and entered the newly formed 46th Signal Regiment. In 1998, the 46th Signal Regiment was assigned to the army's Signal Command. On 1 January 2001, the regiment received the Signal Battalion "Vulture" from the disbanded 45th Signal Regiment, which operated the army's telecommunications network in southern Italy. Since then the regiment operates the army's telecommunications network in southern Italy and Sicily. The regiment's anniversary falls, as for all signal units, on 20 June 1918, the day the Austro-Hungarian Army began its retreat across the Piave river during the Second Battle of the Piave River.

== History ==
=== Cold War ===
On 1 January 1953, the 11th Connections Company was formed for the XI Territorial Military Command in Palermo. On 1 September 1956, the 11th Connections Company was renamed 6th Signal Company.

During the 1975 army reform the army disbanded the regimental level and newly independent battalions were granted for the first time their own flags. During the reform signal battalions were renamed for mountain passes or volcanoes. On 15 November 1975, the reform the 6th Signal Company was renamed 46th Signal Company and, on 1 May 1976, the company was expanded to 46th Signal Battalion "Mongibello". The battalion was named for the volcano Mongibello, which is also known as Mount Etna. This made the battalion, together with the 45th Signal Battalion "Vulture", only one of two Italian Army signal battalions not named for an Alpine or Apennine mountain pass. The battalion consisted of a command, a command and services platoon, and two signal companies. The battalion was assigned to the Sicily Military Region's Signal Command and operated the army's telecommunications network on the island of Sicily and in the province of Reggio Calabria. On 12 November 1976, the President of the Italian Republic Giovanni Leone granted with decree 846 the battalion a flag.

In 1985, the battalion's Command and Services Platoon was expanded to Command and Services Company and the 3rd Field Support Company was formed. Afterwards the battalion consisted of a command, a Command and Services Company, the 1st TLC Infrastructure Managing Company, the 2nd TLC Infrastructure Managing Company, which was detached to Catania, and the 3rd Field Support Company.

=== Recent times ===
On 1 September 1997, the battalion was transferred to the Southern Area Logistic Command. On 27 October 1997, the 46th Signal Battalion "Mongibello" lost its autonomy and the next day the battalion entered the newly formed 46th Signal Regiment as Signal Battalion "Mongibello". On the same day, the flag of the 46th Signal Battalion "Mongibello" was transferred from the battalion to the 46th Signal Regiment.

On 1 October 1998, the regiment was assigned to the army's C4 IEW Command. On 1 June 1999, the Signal Speciality left the Italian Army's Engineer Arm and was elevated to Signal Arm. On 1 January 2001, the regiment received the Signal Battalion "Vulture" from the disbanded 45th Signal Regiment in Nocera Inferiore. On 10 September of the same year, the regiment received the 25th C4 Maintenance Unit in San Giorgio a Cremano.

== Organization ==
As of 2024 the 46th Signal Regiment operates the army's telecommunications network in the Apulia, Basilicata, Calabria, Campania, Molise, and Sicily regions and is organized as follows:

- 46th Signal Regiment, in Palermo
  - Command and Logistic Support Company, in Palermo
  - Signal Battalion "Mongibello", in Palermo
    - 1st Signal Company — Area Support
    - 2nd Signal Company — C4 Systems Center
  - Signal Battalion "Vulture", in Nocera Inferiore
    - Command and Logistic Support Company
    - 3rd Signal Company — Area Support
    - 4th Signal Company — C4 Systems Center
  - 11th C4 Maintenance Unit, in Palermo
  - 25th C4 Maintenance Unit, in San Giorgio a Cremano
    - C4 Maintenance Detachment, in Bari
  - Computer Incident Response Team, in Palermo

The Battalion "Mongibello" covers Sicily and Calabria, while the Battalion "Vulture" covers Campania, Basilicata, and Apulia.
