= Corso Sirena =

- Interactive map of Corso Sirena
- Namesake: two-tailed siren (the coat of arms of Barra)
- Location: Naples, Italy
- Arrondissement: Municipality VI
- Quarter: Barra
- Postal code: 80147
- Nearest metro station: Circumvesuviana (Barra station)

Corso Sirena is a historic thoroughfare of Naples, at the heart of the quarter of Barra, in the eastern part of the city. Along it unwinds the ribbon-shaped historic centre of the old hamlet, marked by the presence of Vesuvian villas (Miglio d'oro) and old churches. The name comes from the two-tailed siren, the ancient coat of arms of the quarter.

== History ==
The territory of Barra has been inhabited since Greek times, and the remains of a Roman villa have been found there. The place name Sirena is tied to the ancient settlement of Sirinum, whose emblem bore a single-tailed siren; around 1490 the coat of arms with the two-tailed siren was created to mark the unification of that settlement with the villages of Casabalera and Tresano, and to this day the main thoroughfare of the built-up area bears the name Corso Sirena.

During the early modern period Barra took on the form of a royal hamlet (casale regio) with its characteristic ribbon shape, surrounded by thriving countryside and adorned with villas, along the route leading to the Vesuvian area and to the Golden Mile. The view over the gulf and the closeness to the royal residence attracted the Neapolitan nobility, who had holiday houses built there. The 1631 eruption of Mount Vesuvius and, above all, the 1656 plague, which halved the population, left a deep mark on the area. The construction, in 1658, of the church of Santa Maria di Costantinopoli allo Scassone is tied to the end of the epidemic.

From the early nineteenth century onward, and increasingly after the special law for Naples of 1904, an important industrial hub developed in Barra, gradually transforming its appearance and turning the old holiday resort into an urban periphery. The "risanamento" ("urban renewal") works, similar to those carried out in Naples itself, date to 1890 and included the opening of Corso Bruno Buozzi (formerly Corso Vittorio Emanuele III), of Piazza De Franchis and of Corso IV Novembre.

== Monuments and places of interest ==
=== Churches ===
Along Corso Sirena and in its immediate surroundings stand several religious buildings, among them the Church of the Annunziata, the Church of San Domenico, with its adjoining Dominican convent; the so-called Chiesa del Fanciullo, which preserves a canvas attributed to Francesco Solimena; and the church of Santa Maria di Costantinopoli allo Scassone, built by the inhabitants in 1658 in thanksgiving for the end of the plague.

=== Vesuvian villas ===
Corso Sirena and the surrounding streets preserve some of Barra's seventeenth- and eighteenth-century Vesuvian villas, part of the Golden Mile circuit. Among the most notable are Villa Pignatelli di Monteleone, an eighteenth-century building realised with the involvement of the leading architects active in Naples; Villa Mastellone, built in 1678 by Domenico Mastellone and fitted in 1699 with a chapel dedicated to Saint Rose; Villa De Cristofaro, at number 177, and Villa Damiano, at number 197, both by now fragmentary witnesses of former splendour. Nearby also stand Villa Salvetti, Villa Letizia, a princely 17th-century residence protected under the law on the Vesuvian villas, Villa Bisignano, and the villa that belonged to Solimena.

== Traditions ==
Corso Sirena is linked to Barra's Festa dei Gigli. The dance of the Gigli historically followed this route until 1954, after which it moved to a circuit taking in via Serino, Corso Bruno Buozzi and via Luigi Martucci.

== Bibliography ==
- Raffaele Ciaravolo, La storia di Barra, Naples, 2000.
- Anna Ferrara, Le chiese e le ville vesuviane di Barra, Naples, Edizioni Magna Graecia, 2000.
- Tommaso Lomonaco, Barra: da Comune a Circoscrizione, Naples, Edizioni Magna Graecia, 2004.
- Romano Marino, La sirena racconta, Naples, 2003.

== See also ==
- Vesuvian villas of the Golden Mile
