= Franking =

Marking qualifying mail to be postally serviced

Franking comprises all devices, markings, or combinations thereof ("franks") applied to mails of any class which qualifies them to be postally serviced. Types of franks include postage stamps (both adhesive and printed on postal stationery, whether uncanceled or precanceled), impressions applied via postage meter (via so-called "postage evidencing systems"), official use "Penalty" franks, Business Reply Mail (BRM), and other permit Imprints (Indicia), manuscript and facsimile "franking privilege" signatures, "soldier's mail" markings, and any other forms authorized by the 192 postal administrations that are members of the Universal Postal Union.

== Types and methods ==
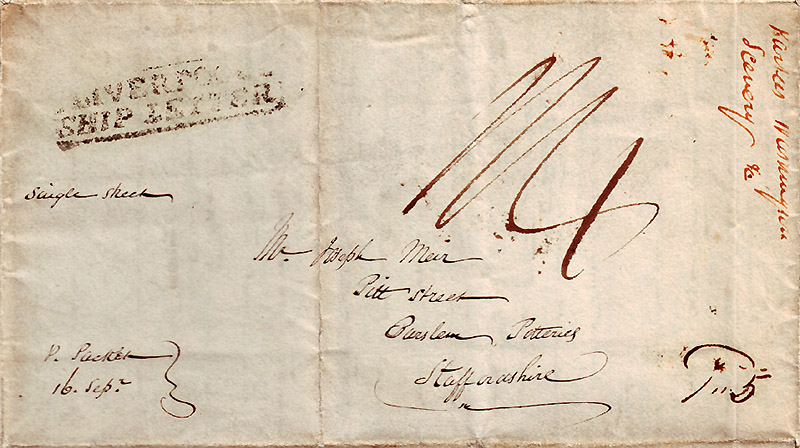
An 1832 stampless single-sheet "Liverpool Ship Letter" pen franked "Paid 5" by a U.S. postal clerk in Philadelphia, PA

While all affixed postage stamps and other markings applied to mail to qualify it for postal service is franking, not all types and methods are used to frank all types or classes of mails. Each of the world's national and other postal administrations establishes and regulates the specific methods and standards of franking as they apply to domestic operations within their own postal systems. Although there are differences in the manner that the postal systems of the 192 nations that belong to the Universal Postal Union (UPU) apply and regulate the way their mails are franked, most mail types fall under one (and sometimes more) of four major types and/or methods of franking: postage (stamps, etc.), privilege, official business, and business reply mail.

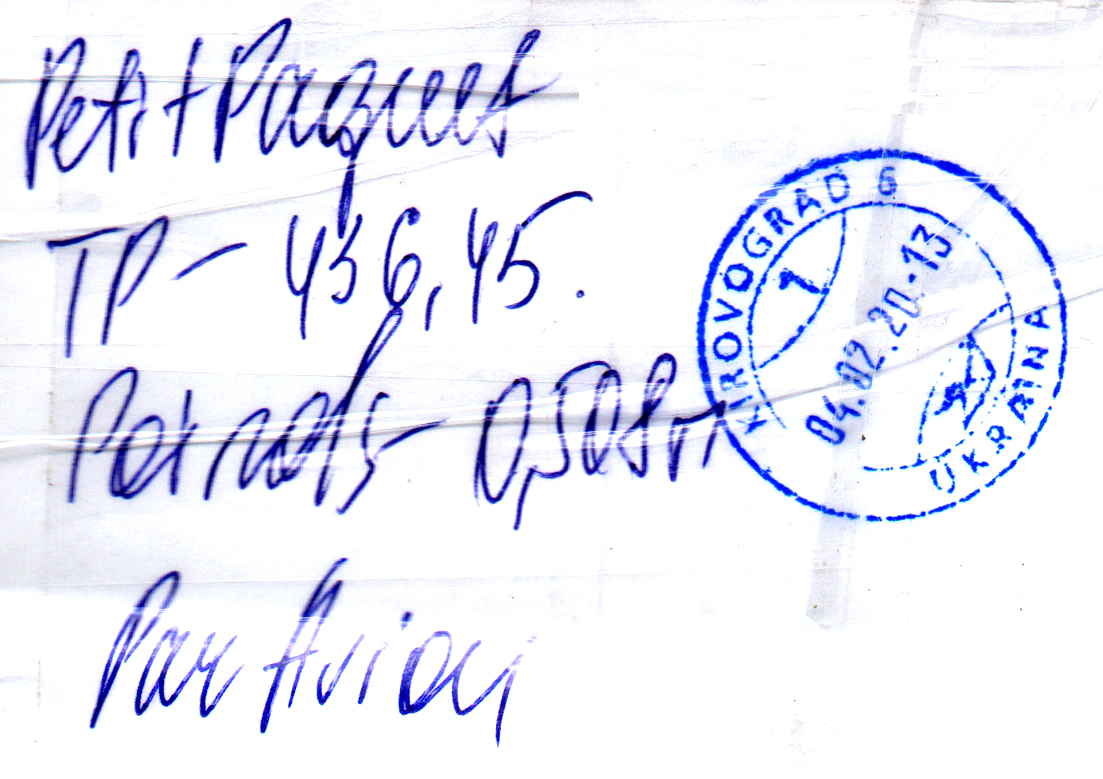
Modern postal clerk script franking with circular date stamp (Ukraine)

Any and all conflicts that might arise affecting the franking of mail types serviced by multiple administrations which result from differences in these various postal regulations and/or practices are mediated by the UPU, a specialized agency of the United Nations which sets the rules and technical standards for international mail exchanges. The UPU co-ordinates the application of the regulations of postal systems of its member nations, including as they relate to franking, to permit the servicing and exchange of international mail. Prior to the establishment of the UPU in 1874, international mails sometimes bore mixed franking (the application of franking of more than one country) before the world's postal services universally agreed to deliver international mails bearing only the franking of the country of origin.

=== Postage (stamps, etc) ===
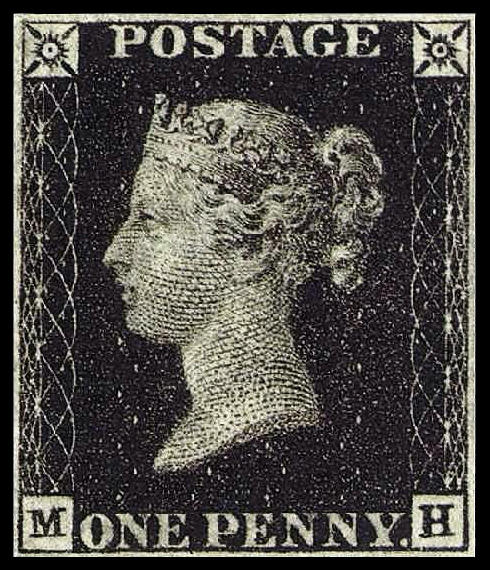
1840 (UK)

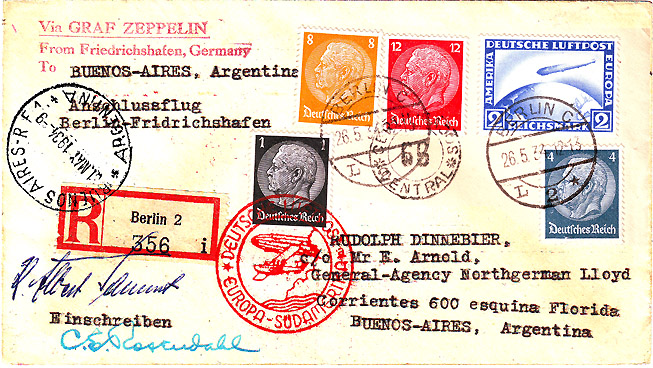
Postally franked German Air Mail cover (Berlin-Buenos Aires via D-LZ127 Graf Zeppelin (1934))

"Postage" franking is the physical application and presence of postage stamps, or any other markings recognized and accepted by the postal system or systems providing service, which indicate the payment of sufficient fees for the class of service which the item of mail is to be or had been afforded. Prior to the introduction to the world's first postage stamps in Britain in 1840 ("Penny Black") and 1841 ("Penny Red"), pre-paid franking was applied exclusively by a manuscript or handstamped "Paid" marking and the amount of the fee collected. The first US postage stamp was the red brown Five cent Franklin (SC-1) issued in 1847.

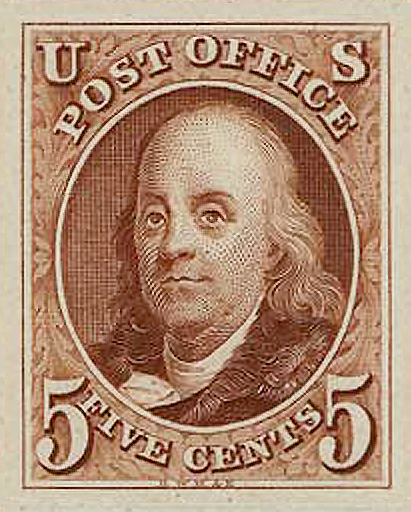
1847 (US)

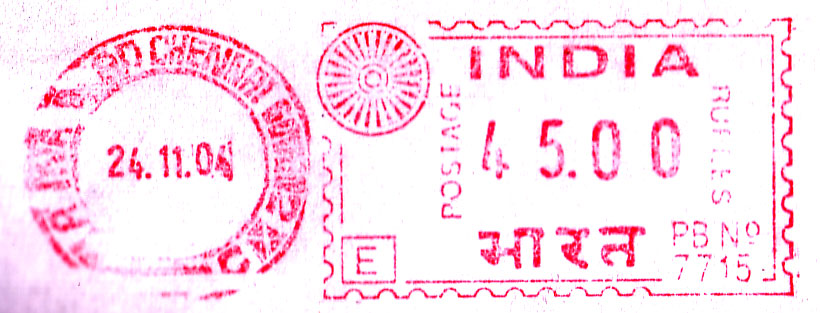
Machine printed postal frank (India)

In addition to stamps, postage franking can be in the form of printed or stamped impressions made in an authorized format and applied directly by a franking machine, postage meter, computer generated franking labels or other similar methods ("Postage Evidencing Systems"), any form of preprinted "Postage Paid" notice authorized by a postal service permit ("Indicia"), or any other marking method accepted by the postal service and specified by its regulations, as proof of the prepayment of the appropriate fees. Postal franking also includes "Postage Due" stamps or markings affixed by a postal service which designate any amount of insufficient or omitted postage fees to be collected on delivery. Some countries allow senders to purchase one-time codes online that can be hand-written onto the piece of mail, such as the Netherlands' Postzegelcodes introduced in 2013.

=== Franking privilege ===
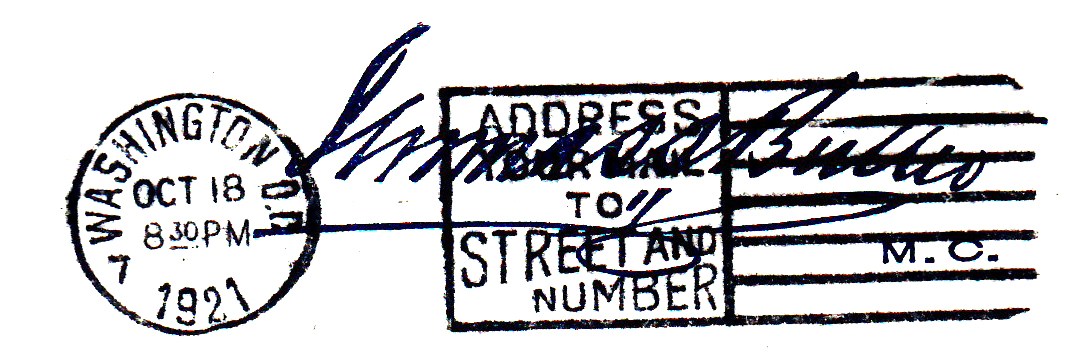
Machine cancelled U.S. Congressional frank

"Privilege" franking is a personally pen-signed or printed facsimile signature of a person with a "franking privilege" such as certain government officials (especially legislators) and others designated by law or postal regulations. This allows the letter or other parcel to be sent without the application of a postage stamp. In the United States this is called the "Congressional frank" which can only be used for "Official Business" mail. In Hong Kong, the Postmaster General possesses, by virtue of the Post Office Ordinance, the exclusive privilege of carrying letters from place to place, and of performing all incidental services such as those of collecting and delivering letters.

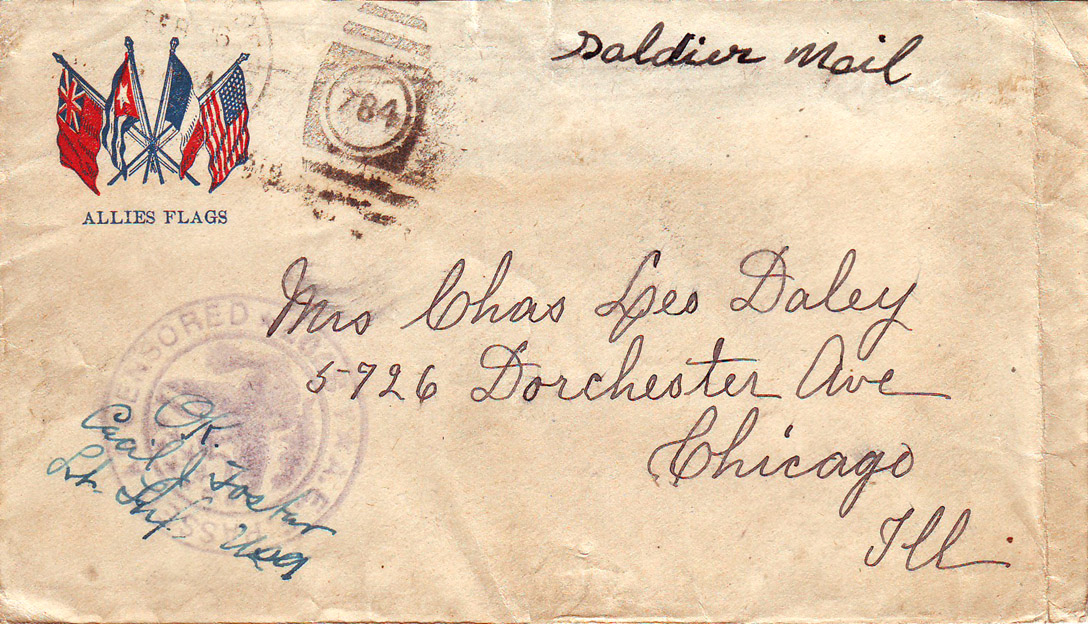
WWI pen franked "Soldier Mail"

In addition to this type of franking privilege, from time to time (especially during wartimes) governments and/or postal administrations also authorize active duty service members and other designated individuals to send mail for free by writing "Free" or "Soldier's Mail" (or equivalent) on the item of mail in lieu of paid postal franking, or by using appropriate free franked postal stationery. In the United States, unless otherwise designated, such mail is serviced by both the military and civil postal systems that accept them as First Class letter mail. In Mainland China, conscripts are entitled to the privilege of free postage on ordinary mail of up to 20 grams for personal correspondence from their units, which are stamped with a triangular red "Free Letter for Conscripts" franking.

=== "Official Business" ===
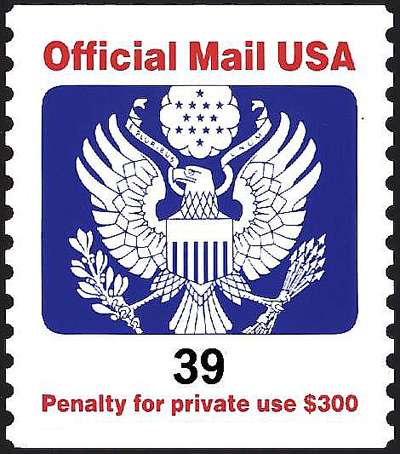
"Penalty Mail Stamp"

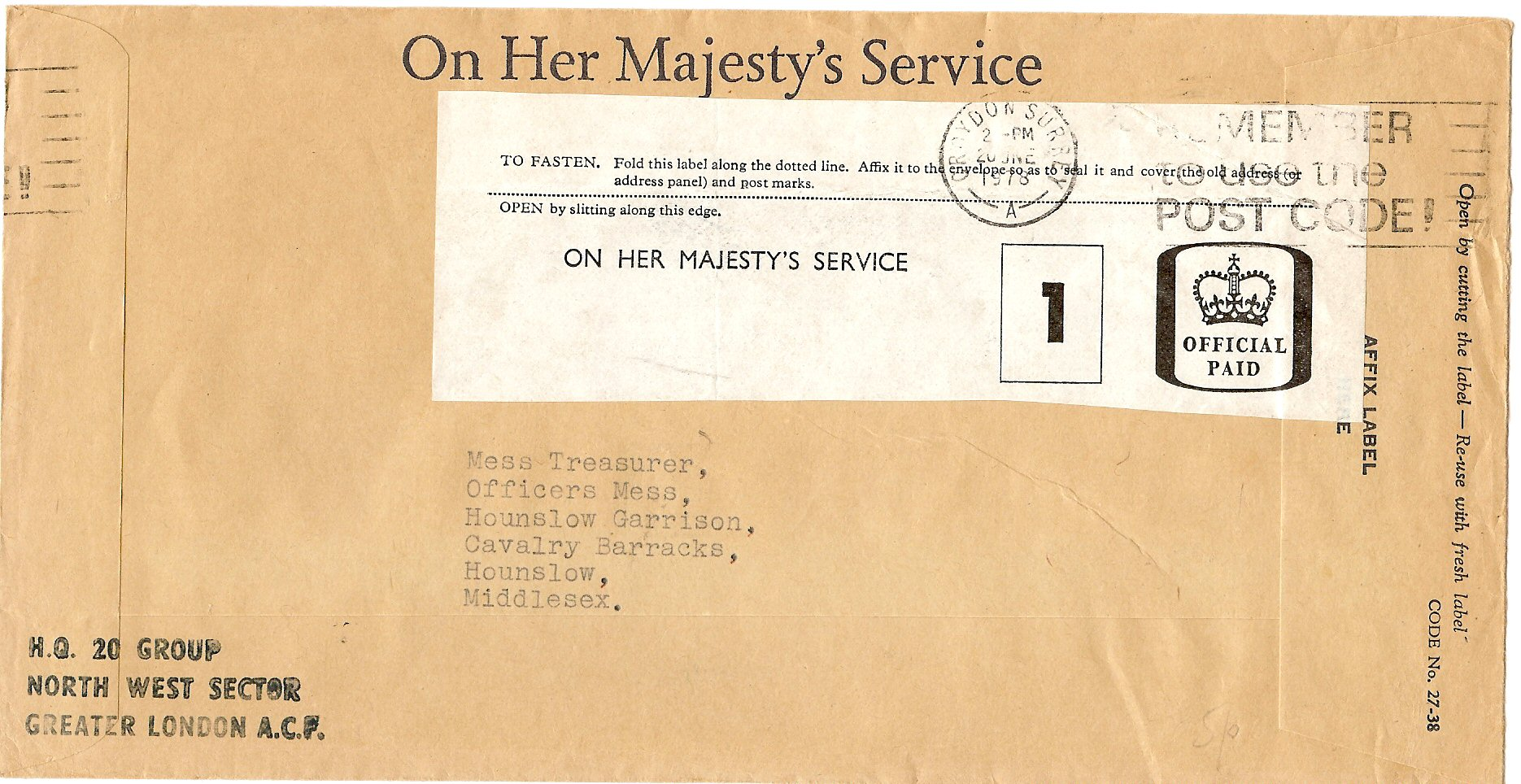
"Official Business" franking from Great Britain (c. 1978)

"Official Business" franking is any frank printed on or affixed to mail which is designated as being for official business of national governments (i.e. governments which also have postal administrations) and thus qualify for postal servicing without any additional paid franking. In Commonwealth countries the printed frank reads "Official Paid" and is used by government departments on postmarks, stationery, adhesive labels, official stamps, and handstruck or machine stamps.

In Canada, the Governor General, Senators, members of the House of Commons, the Clerk of the House of Commons, Parliamentary Librarian and Associate Parliamentary Librarian, the Director of the Parliamentary Protective Service, the Parliamentary Budget Officer, the Conflict of Interest and Ethics Commissioner, and the Senate Ethics Officer all have franking privilege. Mail sent to or from these offices is free of charge if the mail is sent exclusively within Canada. Bulk mail from members of the House of Commons is limited to four mailings per year, and can only be sent within the member's own electoral district.

US "Penalty" frank

In the United States, such mails are sent using postal stationery or address labels that include a "Penalty" frank ("Penalty For Private Use To Avoid Payment of Postage $300") printed on the piece of mail, and/or is franked with Penalty Mail Stamps (PMS) of appropriate value. Such mails are generally serviced as First Class Mail (or equivalent) unless otherwise designated (such as "bulk" mailings).

=== "Business Reply Mail" ===
BRM franking (US)

"Business Reply Mail" (BRM) franking is a preprinted frank with a Permit number which authorizes items so marked to be posted as First Class Mail with the authorizing postal service without advance payment by the person posting the item. (International Reply Mail may specify Air Mail as the class of service.) Postage fees for BRM are paid by the permit holder upon its delivery to the specified address authorized by the permit and preprinted on the item of business reply mail. Governments also use BRM to permit replies associated with official business purposes.

== History of the "franking privilege" ==
A limited form of franking privilege originated in the British Parliament in 1660, with the passage of an act authorizing the formation of the General Post Office. By 1772, the abundance of franked letters represented lost revenue of more than one third the total collections of the Post Office. In the 19th century, as use of the post office increased significantly in Britain, it was expected that anybody with a Parliament connection would get his friends' mail franked.

In the United States, the franking privilege predates the establishment of the republic itself, as the Continental Congress bestowed it on its members in 1775. The First United States Congress enacted a franking law in 1789 during its very first session. Congress members would spend much time "inscribing their names on the upper right-hand corner of official letters and packages" until the 1860s for the purpose of sending out postage-free mail. Yet, on January 31, 1873, the Senate abolished "the congressional franking privilege after rejecting a House-passed provision that would have provided special stamps for the free mailing of printed Senate and House documents." Within two years, however, Congress began to make exceptions to this ban, including free mailing of the Congressional Record, seeds, and agricultural reports. Finally, in 1891, noting that its members were the only government officials required to pay postage, Congress restored full franking privileges.

In 1892, Congressman Tom Johnson and his allies read Henry George's Protection or Free Trade, in its entirety, into the Congressional Record, and franked it to millions of constituents; protectionist members responded by entering Robert Percival Porter's Free-Trade Folly and D. G. Harriman's American Tariffs from Plymouth Rock to McKinley. By 1895, Congress had limited insertions to the Congressional Record to no more than two pages without unanimous consent. The franking of congressional mail has since been subject to ongoing review and regulation.

The phrase franking is derived from the Franks, a Germanic tribe that conquered Gallia—modern-day France—during the last days of the Western Roman Empire. The Franks held more legal rights than the Gallo-Roman natives. To be a Frank was to be "free" under the law. Another use of that term is speaking "frankly", i.e. "freely". Because Benjamin Franklin was an early United States Postmaster General, satirist Richard Armour referred to free congressional mailings as the "Franklin privilege".

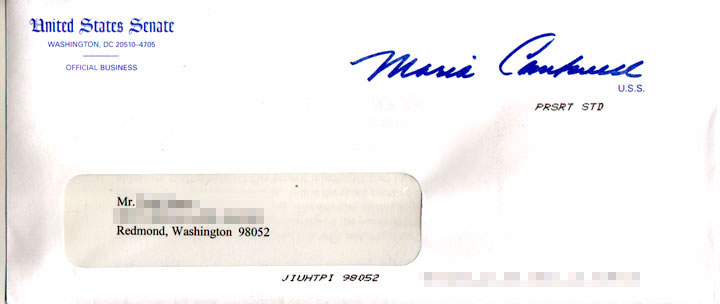
A U.S. Congressional franked mailing

The use of a franking privilege is not absolute but is generally limited to official business, constituent bulk mails, and other uses as prescribed by law, such as the "Congressional Frank" afforded to Members of Congress in the United States. This is not "free" franking, however, as each member is appropriated a budgeted amount to compensate the USPS for servicing the mail.

A six-member bipartisan Commission on Congressional Mailing Standards, colloquially known as the "Franking Commission", is responsible for oversight and regulation of the franking privilege in the Congress. Among the Commission's responsibilities is to establish the "Official Mail Allowance" for each Member based proportionally on the number of constituents they serve. Certain other persons are also accorded the privilege such as Members-elect and former presidents and their spouse or widow as well. A president who is convicted in the Senate as a result of an impeachment trial would not have a franking privilege after being forced to leave office. The sitting president does not have personal franking privileges but the vice president, who is also President of the Senate, does.

In Italy, mail sent to the President was free of charge until this franking privilege was abolished in 1999.

In New Zealand, individuals writing to a Member of Parliament can do so without paying for postage.

== See also ==
- Postage meter
- Postzegelcode
