= Digital stamp =

A digital stamp in crafting, stamping, card making and scrapbooking is a digital image printed onto paper from the user's printer. Digital stamps come in a variety of formats, including PNG, JPG, and TIFF. Digital stamps offer many advantages over traditional rubber stamps because of their ability to be flipped, resized, rotated and easily stored.

In addition, digital stamps can be printed on a variety of papers and cardstocks, and when properly heat sealed can be used with a variety of coloring mediums including colored pencil, copic markers, even watercolors.

There are many digital stamping companies today.

A digital stamp, in mail or philately, is similar to a conventional postage stamp except it is resident on or in a computer. A digital stamp can typically be downloaded and printed onto envelopes or packages by authorized individuals.

Some artistamp-issuing entities have issued "digital stamps", which have usually remained only pictures on a computer.

A digital stamp can also be an encoded way of "approving" or "remarking on" a digital copy of a document. Paper/hard copies of documents continue to be popular because they can be signed/initialed/remarked on in a manner that is unique and traceable to the reviewer. A digital stamp seeks to duplicate or replace this and enable a paperless exchange of information that still manages to have a verifiable comment and review.

== See also ==
- Computer vended postage
- Postzegelcode
