= Postzegelcode =

Hand-written method of postal franking in the Netherlands

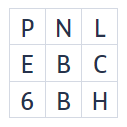
Example of a postzegelcode

A postzegelcode is a hand-written method of franking in the Netherlands. It consists of a code containing nine numbers and letters that customers can purchase online from PostNL and write directly on their piece of mail within five days as proof of payment in place of a postage stamp.

For mail within the Netherlands, the nine letters and numbers are written in a three-by-three grid. For international mail there is a fourth additional row that contains P, N, L.

The system was started in 2013. Initially the postzegelcode was more expensive than a stamp because additional handling systems were required. Then for a while the postzegelcode was cheaper. Eventually the rates were set to the same price.

In December 2020, 590,000 people sent cards with postzegelcodes.

== Safety ==
Since the codes are valid for only five days, the chance that someone would guess a recently purchased code is quite low. Assuming 26 letters and 9 digits (the zero is not used to avoid confusion with the letter O), there are 35^{9} (78.8 trillion) possibilities. Even if a postzegelcode were used for all mail items in the Netherlands, the probability is about 1 in 2 million that any stamp code has been sold in the past five days.
