= Giosuè Sangiovanni =

Italian zoologist (1775–1849)

Giosuè Edoard Sangiovanni (15 January 1775 – 17 May 1849) was an Italian zoologist, the first professor of comparative anatomy in Italy and an early exponent of evolution.

Born at Laurino in the kingdom of Naples, he followed his education in philosophy and mathematics at Naples with medical study at the Ospedale degli Incurabili there. With the fall of the Napoleonic Neapolitan Republic of 1799, Sangiovanni fled to exile in Paris. There, during the Napoleonic Empire he was a pupil of the prominent French zoologists Jean-Baptiste de Lamarck. In his distinguished career Sangiovanni was enrolled as a Chevalier of the Legion of Honor.

Sangiovanni was supportive of Lamarck and Erasmus Darwin's evolutionary ideas. He obtained a copy of Zoonomia and walked around Paris for several weeks with it in his pocket.

Called to Naples in 1806, at the reorganization of the university, he planned and brought to fruition the university's Museo Zoologico and held the first chair of comparative anatomy in the faculty of natural sciences.

He died after an extended illness, in retirement at Posillipo near Naples.
