= 6th municipality of Naples =

Sixth Municipality of Naples Municipalità 6 Sesta Municipalità
- Borough
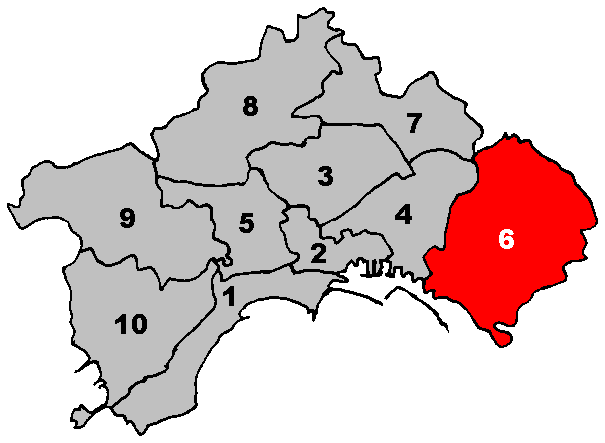
- Location within Naples
- Coordinates: 40°50′24.16″N 14°19′8.67″E
- Country: Italy
- Municipality: Naples
- Established: 2005
- Seat: Corso Sirena, 305

Government
  - President: Anna Cozzino
  - Vice President: Massimo Cilenti

Area
  - Total: 19.28 km^{2} (7.44 sq mi)

Population (2007)
  - Total: 117,641
  - Density: 6,100/km^{2} (16,000/sq mi)
- Website: M6 on Naples site

The Sixth Municipality (In Italian: Sesta Municipalità or Municipalità 6) is one of the ten boroughs in which the Italian city of Naples is divided. It is the largest municipality in the city by surface area.

== Geography ==
The municipality represents the easternmost suburb of the city and borders with Portici, San Giorgio a Cremano, San Sebastiano al Vesuvio, Cercola, Volla and Casoria.

Its territory includes the zone of Pietrarsa, in front of San Giorgio, famous for the railway museum.

== Administrative division ==
The Sixth Municipality is divided into 3 quarters:

Quarter	Population	Area (km²)
Barra	38,183	7.82
Ponticelli	54,097	9.11
San Giovanni a Teduccio	25,361	2.35
Total	117,641	19.28
