= San Giovanni a Teduccio =

Quarter of Naples, Italy

Coordinates: 40°50′N 14°19′E

- Quarter of Naples
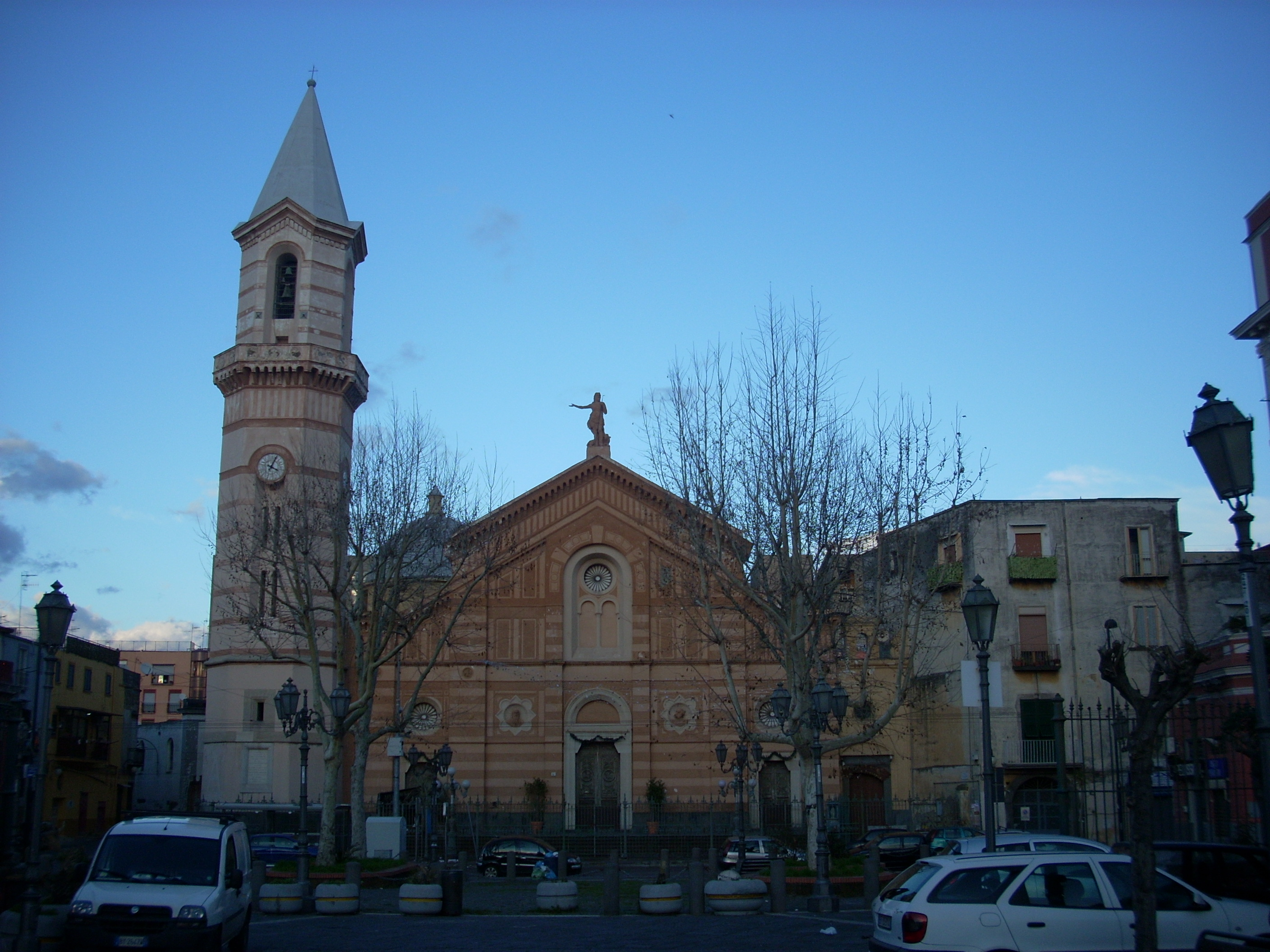

- Location of San Giovanni a Teduccio within Naples
- Country: Italy
- Region: Campania
- City: Naples
- Municipalità: 6th

Area
  - Total: 2.35 km^{2} (0.91 sq mi)

Population
  - Total: 23,839
  - Density: 10,100/km^{2} (26,300/sq mi)
- Demonym: sangiovannesi
- Postal code: 80146

San Giovanni a Teduccio (Neapolitan: San Giuanne a Teduccio) is a coastal quarter in the east of Naples, in southern Italy.

== Etymology ==
The area took its name after the discovery of a marble bust of John the Baptist in the 4th century which was found in a building that belonged to Theodosia, one of the daughters of Roman Emperor Valentinian I. The name "Teduccio" is a deformation of her name and in Latin the settlement was known as Sanctus Johannis ad Theodociam.

== Geography ==
The area has a population of about 30,000 inhabitants.

== History ==
The area was incorporated into the city of Naples under Fascist rule. It has been heavily developed since the end of World War II and it suffers the same problems of unemployment and crime that afflict many of the suburbs in Naples.

== Economy ==
Historically, the area was at the centre of early industry in Naples and contains the building that produced the first railway in Italy, Pietrarsa, which is now a railway museum. In the past the area also hosted the factory of one of the most important canning industries in the Mediterranean, Cirio. Unemployment is still a big issue for the suburb.

== Monuments and important places ==
Among the most important places to visit in San Giovanni a Teduccio there are some churches like The Church of Saint Giuseppe and Madonna of Lourdes, The Church of Saint Maria del Soccorso, and a fort called Forte di Vigliena. The Church of Saint Giuseppe and Madonna of Lourdes was designed by the famous Neapolitan architect Giulio De Luca. Its construction started in 1959, and it was built in the centre of the Rione Nuova Villa. It took a lot of time to build the church, in fact the construction was completed in 1964. It is constituted by a single rectangular nave, the roof is made of self-supporting reinforced concrete and, its entrance is preceded by a front porch. Many sacred images are framed in each pillar. Its exterior is completely covered by bricks. As regards the Church of Saint Maria del Soccorso, it is a neoclassical church which was built in 1517 but it was fully completed in 1930. The church hosts some frescoes attributed to Umberto Colonna, two paintings attributed to Francesco Celebrano, and the wooden simulacrum of Madonna del Soccorso by Francesco Verzella. As regards Forte di Vigliena, it was an historical building but, nowadays there are only its ruins. The fort was built in 1502 by the viceroy Juan Manuel Fernàndez Pacheco, marquis of Villena, and took its name from him. It was used during the Kingdom of the Two Sicilies as a place where to teach the practise of artillery to the cadets of the military academy Nunziatella. In 1799 the fort was theatre of the battle between the supporters of the Repubblica Partenopea and the supporters of Cardinal Ruffo who supported the Kingdom. During the battle the fort was almost totally destroyed. In 1891 some members of Parliament, for example Pasquale Villari, proclaimed the fort "National Monument", and it was also restored. Near Forte di Vigliena there is one of the buildings of the University Federico II, which was built in 2016. Among the important places, there is also important a park with an artificial lake dedicated to the famous actor, screenwriter and film director Massimo Troisi which takes its name from him. In order to improve the suburb, the Neapolitan muralist Jorit made in 2017 a mural painting dedicated to the Argentinian footballer Diego Armando Maradona in Taverna del Ferro Street. As the artist himself said, the painting was made in order to give visibility to the suburb and to adorn it.

== Cinema and Television ==
Since the end of 2010s, San Giovanni a Teduccio has been chosen as location for both expensive international productions as My Brilliant Friend (TV series), a tv-series created by Saverio Costanzo in 2018 and produced by Rai and HBO, and low-budget local production as Fino al mare, a short-film directed by Daniele De Stefano and Pasquale Fresegna and produced by Art 33

== Notes and references ==
https://www.ilmattino.it/spettacoli/televisione/l_amica_geniale_nuove_riprese_marzo-4185300.html#
