= San Giorgio a Cremano =

- Comune
- Città di San Giorgio a Cremano
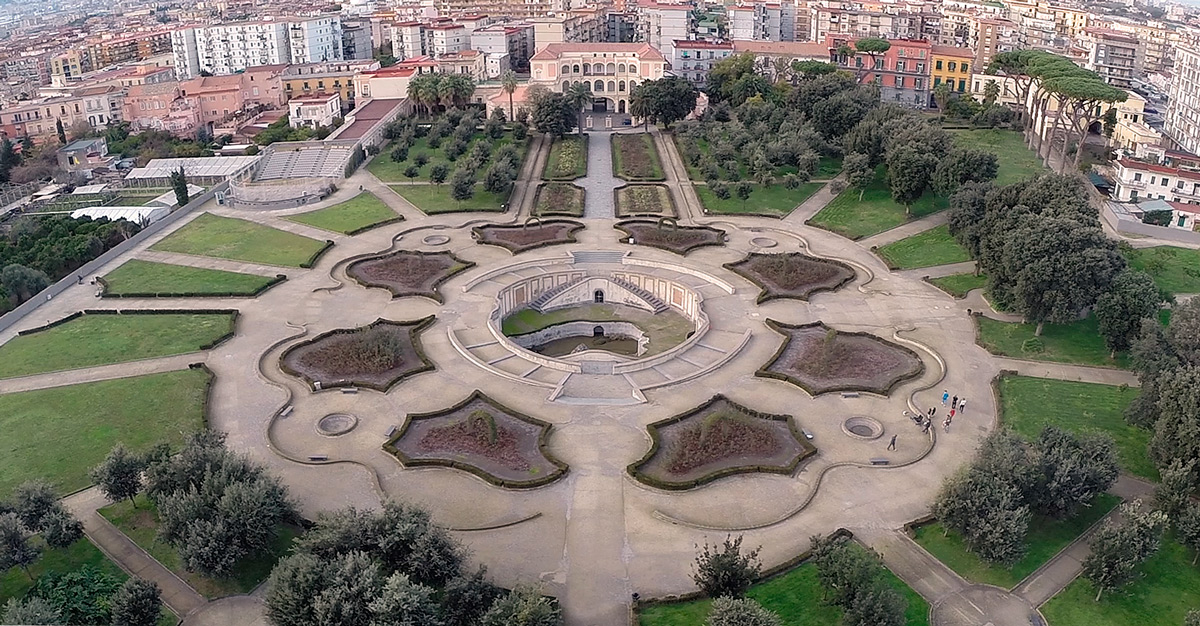
- Aerial view of Villa Vannucchi and the city

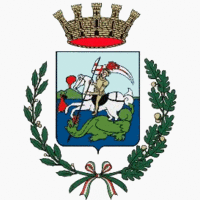
- Coat of arms

- Location within Italy Location within Campania
- Coordinates: 40°50′N 14°20′E
- Country: Italy
- Region: Campania
- Metropolitan city: Naples (NA)

Government
  - Mayor: Giorgio Zinno (PD)

Area
  - Total: 4.11 km^{2} (1.59 sq mi)
- Elevation: 56 m (184 ft)

Population (2026)
  - Total: 41,585
  - Density: 10,100/km^{2} (26,200/sq mi)
- Demonym: Sangiorgesi
- Time zone: UTC+1 (CET)
  - Summer (DST): UTC+2 (CEST)
- Postal code: 80046
- Dialing code: 081
- Patron saint: Saint George
- Saint day: 23 April
- Website: Official website

San Giorgio a Cremano is a city and comune (municipality) in the Metropolitan City of Naples in the region of Campania in southern Italy. It is located on the foothills of Mount Vesuvius to the west of the volcano and the Tyrrhenian Sea, and is five kilometres to the south east of the centre of Naples. The municipality has views of Mount Vesuvius, Mount Somma and the Bay of Naples. It has 41,585 inhabitants.

San Giorgio a Cremano was first settled in the 10th and 11th centuries, and has since been fairly regularly affected by the eruptions of Mount Vesuvius. Along with Portici, Ercolano, Torre del Greco, and Torre Annunziata, San Giorgio a Cremano is one of the five traditional towns that were to be found heading south from Naples on the coastal road along the Bay of Naples. In the 18th century the comune had become a popular tourist resort, and attracted wealthier residents and the aristocracy from the Kingdom of the Two Sicilies, before going into decline following Italian unification, although primary industries and agriculture have persisted within the comune from its foundation to the modern day.

By the 19th century San Giorgio a Cremano had been absorbed by the expanding urban conglomeration of Naples, and it is now one of the most densely populated areas in the whole European Union. San Giorgio a Cremano is served by the Naples–Salerno railway network of Trenitalia and the Circumvesuviana metropolitan railway which connects it with central Naples, and is easily accessible by a number of major roads.

A comune of the Somma–Vesuvio National Park, San Giorgio a Cremano is known for hosting a huge number of so-called Ville Vesuviane (Vesuvian Villas), built between 18th and 19th centuries century for the nobility of the Kingdom of the Two Sicilies. These are a part of the Miglio d'Oro (the Golden Mile), an urbanistic and artistic complex which in 1997 have been included in the World Biosphere Network list of UNESCO (Somma–Vesuvius and Golden Mile).

It is also known for having a strong theatre tradition, whose highest representative was the actor and producer Massimo Troisi, who was one of only seven actors to be posthumously nominated for an Academy Award for Best Actor for his role in the movie Il Postino.

== Etymology ==
The name "San Giorgio a Cremano" (literally "Saint George of the Cremated"), is a reference to the reverence with which the residents of the area in the 10th century held for the Vesuvius. The superstitious and devoutly religious locals saw an analogy between the eruptions of Vesuvius, and a dragon breathing fire, and quickly adopted Saint George as their patron saint, due to the legend of Saint George and the Dragon in which he slays the Dragon. The residents believed by adopting Saint George as their patron saint he would protect them from the 'dragon' or the eruptions of Vesuvius.

The term "Cremano" is an ancient name for a strip of land between Portici and San Giorgio (the site is referred to as the Cupa di Cremano and Pozzo di Cremano). It derives directly from the Latin word crematum which refers to the earth having been cremated by the lava flows of Vesuvius. Others believe though, that the name actually refers to Cambrano, a shortening of Cambarus who was a Roman landowner of the area in ancient times. Another theory also believes it simply refers to the Latin word "crambe", which means "Cabbage", speculating that cabbage crops may once have been grown in the area.

Residents of San Giorgio a Cremano are referred to as Sangiorgesi.

== History ==
=== Early history ===
The landscape of the region in which San Giorgio a Cremano is located has been drastically altered over time by the continuing eruptions of Vesuvius. As a result, it is difficult to find evidence of pre-historic occupation in the area. It is known that from Roman times, nearby Herculaneum and Pompeii were well populated settlements, and it is likely that some parts of the region were utilised for agriculture. There are suggestions that wine growing may have been common on the hills of the area.

However the eruption of 79CE in which Pompeii and Herculaneum was destroyed, made much of the region in which San Giorgio is now located, and neighbouring regions, completely uninhabitable and no longer of any use for agriculture. This remained the situation until the 10th century CE. Until its reoccupation, the region was usually referred to as Foris Flubeum, indicating that it was separated from Naples by the legendary ancient Sebeto River, which has now disappeared.

=== Middle Ages ===
The earliest post-Roman references to the region indicate that by the mid-8th century weavers had begun production in and around the area, and industry that persists to the modern era. The shirts and cloths produced in the Province of Naples soon gained an excellent reputation, and were often sought after by nobles throughout Europe.

In 993 CE a small votive chapel named the Capitiniano was erected on a hill in the area, and dedicated to Saint George. It is believed that it is from around this time that the legend of the locals adopting Saint George as their patron saint to protect them from the 'dragon' of Vesuvius' eruptions was born. By the end of the 11th century, a church had been erected over the previous site of the chapel, and the first Casale, or houses, were built nearby to the church. It is believed there was also a monastery, however no trace remains if this was the case. Very soon a cemetery was also consecrated next to the church, and it is from around this time that records indicate the name San Giorgio a Capitiniano was first used to refer to the area.

It has been suggested that around 1200 is one of the likeliest dates for the beginning of the origin of the local religious procession. Held on 23 April (or the first Sunday after), the patron saint's day of Saint George, the procession involves the carrying of a statue of the saint, hoisted onto the shoulders of a group of the devotees, accompanied by loud music, songs, folk dancing, competitions of all kinds, and stalls with sweets and toys. The statue itself is a carved wooden depiction of the saint, originally mounted but the current one is without horse, and it is placed upon a pedestal which is surrounded by garlands of local flowers, and illuminated by candles. The statue was once also plated in silver, but repeated attempts at theft (the most recent in 1981) resulted in the metal being removed.

The statue of a saint was carried in procession for many reasons, such as to fertilise the ground for crops and harvests, to protect from natural disasters such as the risks of drought, floods and further eruptions, and to defend the commune from fatal dangers such as enemies, wars, and plagues. The original route of the procession is not known, but is believed to have begun near the Capitiniano, with the trip not clearly defined, and amended according to the demands and needs of devotees participating.

Some local scholars believe the procession may even have dated from as early as the 8th century, but the wooden statue of Saint George that is carried, depicts him mounted on a horse, in the armour of a crusader. The crusader image cannot date before 1200, and such imagery of Saint George as a crusading knight is thought to only date from the 15th century. It is believed that the wooden statue used in the procession cannot be earlier than 1600, although it is indeed possible the current statue may have replaced an earlier one that had been used in processions before this time.

Over the course of the next few hundred years, houses were increasingly being built down the gentle slope of the hill towards the seaside Cambrano, and the growing town was often being referred to as San Giorgio a Cambrano by the 14th century, which is confirmed in references from 1334, during the reign of Charles of Anjou. In this time, a better road, connecting San Giorgio with Naples in the northwest was completed.

By the late 14th century San Giorgio had grown into a town, and had two main residential zones, above and below the church. These were referred to as di sopra (above), and di bascio (below). At the same time, San Giorgio grew large enough to absorb the nearby town of San Aniello a Cambrano, and the centre of the new larger town remained the hilltop church venerated to Saint George. By the 15th century, this church had once again been renovated, this time in high Gothic architecture, and incorporated three new naves. Despite the improvements to the hilltop church, in 1570 the religious centre of San Giorgio was moved further downhill with the opening of the newly built church of Santa Maria del Principio, around which a prosperous new town centre soon grew. Following the opening of the new church, the procession route was altered to begin at Santa Maria del Principio and run a more regular course through the streets to the hills and back down to the lower end of the commune, giving greater access to the residents to the processional route.

=== Renaissance ===
Between 1140 and 1631 Mount Vesuvius had remained dormant for nearly 500 years, but a violent and sudden eruption in December 1631 was particularly devastating for San Giorgio a Cremano, destroying the new town centre and the sixty-year-old church of Santa Maria del Principio. The 1631 eruption was particularly violent, with several lava flows pouring down different faces of the volcano accompanied by torrents of boiling water, as well as throwing pumice and hot ash into the sky.

Many historical documents, manuscripts and archives from the old church had been moved to the new church of Santa Maria del Principio, and were also lost in the destruction caused by the eruption. Ironically the hilltop church was not as badly damaged. However very few buildings in the town were spared, including another church, San Giorgio Vecchio and the Torre Ummarino – a newly constructed tower. It is not known how many people from San Giorgio, if any, were killed in the 1631 eruption, but records indicate the population was decimated. Whether this was from loss of live, or evacuation is unclear. It has been estimated though, that more than 3,000 people were killed throughout the region in the December 1631 eruption, and from the physical destruction within San Giorgio a Cremano, it can be surmised that many of the dead may have lived there.

The 1631 eruption seems to have led to a re-invigoration of the locals' devotion to their patron saint, Saint George, and the tradition of the local procession is thought to have begun at this time. Saint George had originally been chosen for his reputation as the heroic fighter, an attribute that the devastated locals needed in their protector. The procession was definitely resumed soon after the eruption, and has continued uninterrupted into modern times. Following the destruction of the new church of Santa Maria del Principio, the route of the procession was again altered. The original statue was destroyed in the eruption, but they received as a gift from Emmanuela Caracciolo Pignatelli, Duchess of Montecalvo, a new statue of St. George, in half bust, and that is the statue still venerated today.

By 1670, the church of Santa Maria del Principio had been rebuilt upon the ruins of its second incarnation, in time for the centennial of its original consecration. Once again the Church Casale and town houses had been repopulated, and the new town centre restored. The town experienced an economically prosperous period under the Spanish Kingdom of Naples. The economic prosperity continued under the Bourbon rulers, who had replaced the Habsburgs as the dynastic rulers of the Kingdom of Naples by the 18th century as a result of the War of the Spanish Succession. The rule of Charles III of Spain (1735–59) was a particularly successful period for the whole Province of Naples, including San Giorgio, as he invested heavily in the economy of the region.

It was during this time that the town started to become a holiday resort for Neapolitan noble families. San Giorgio soon developed a reputation as a desirable town to live or holiday in, and became home to many wealthy residents who constructed many of the ornate villas in and around the town, some of which survive to this day. Some of these villas had elaborate walled gardens, such as Villa Bruno.

The Habsburg Spanish King Ferdinand II of Aragon gained control of the Kingdom of Naples in 1559 under the terms of the Treaty of Cateau-Cambrésis, and Spanish migrants began to arrive in the south of Italy. During his rule in the late 16th century, the Camorra first made their presence felt in the Campania region. Originally members primarily consisted of strong family clans that were closely related to Spanish Garduna criminals.

Under the Bourbon rulers that the Camorra truly started to flourish throughout Campania. By the 19th century the Bourbon monarchy were using Camorra clans as police, as soldiers in the army, and as members of the civil service throughout Naples, including in San Giorgio a Cremano.

In 1800 the parish priest Don Domenico de Somma announced there would be a double procession from that year onwards. The first was to take place in April, accompanied by music and detachments of cavalry and infantry. During this procession, the statue was kept for a week in the church of San Giorgio Vecchio to allow it to be venerated by as many people who wished to. Then on the first Sunday in May, the statue was to be once again paraded throughout the commune, riding on a wagon, and accompanied by choir boys dressed as angels, who sang holy praises along with music; however the custom of two processions was abandoned in 1867.

The rule of the House of Bourbon was generally popular throughout Naples, but especially so amongst the strongly religious and royalist residents of San Giorgio a Cremano. However the French Revolution reached the Kingdom of Naples during the rule of Ferdinand IV of Naples, who provoked by his opposition. Horatio Nelson arrived in Naples to warn Ferdinand of the dangers of the revolution, but the Neapolitan King attacked Rome following its fall into French hands. When he was defeated by French forces in Rome, he fled back to Naples, and took the offer from the British there to take refuge in Sicily, leaving Naples in anarchy.

Despite efforts by some revolutionary thinkers, there was not much support for the French Revolution amongst the residents of San Giorgio a Cremano, as even the poorest families, such as the Lazzaroni lived comparatively comfortable lives by the standards of the time. The Bourbon monarchy was popular, and received little opposition. Despite this, the fall of the French monarchy, the successes of the revolution in other parts of Europe, and the absence of King Ferdinand led to the creation of the Parthenopaean Republic in 1799, which incorporated San Giorgio a Cremano.

=== 19th century ===
Very soon all of Europe was in revolutionary turmoil, and not long after the declaration of the Parthenopaean Republic, the Carbonari, a secret society of revolutionaries moved into Naples, and San Giorgio a Cremano as well. Primarily opposed to the pro-Napoleonic policies of Joachim Murat, the Carbonari soon focused their attention on the gaining of political freedoms and the granting of constitutional rights and powers.

After the fall of Napoleon, King Ferdinand IV of Naples resumed control of the Province of Naples and soon after the Congress of Vienna allowed him to re-unify the Kingdom with that of the Kingdom of Sicily, and he became King Ferdinand I of the Two Sicilies. Although popular with artisans and merchants, most of the population of San Giorgio a Cremano were wealthier aristocrats, and welcomed the return of the King rather than siding with the Carbonari.

In 1848 the revolutionary fervour within the kingdom became widespread, and soon the Sicilian revolution of independence of 1848 broke out, although this affected the residents of San Giorgio very little. Although unaffected by the revolutions of 1848, the area suffered badly from the Italian unification twelve years later. The creation of the Kingdom of Italy saw many of the area's wealthier residents moving north to be closer to the seat of national power, and although San Giorgio a Cremano remained a resort destination, the commune went into a long period of economic decline.

With the northern Liberals in power, the north was increasingly developed in areas of industry and agriculture, with the south (Mezzogiorno) increasingly excluded from development and investment. Many of the fine houses and resorts of the region, some occupied for centuries, soon went without maintenance and fell into terminal decline.

Mount Vesuvius again exploded spectacularly on both 1 May and 6 May in 1855. The lava began flowing towards San Giorgio a Cremano, but at a slow pace. The local parish priest at the time, pastor Don Domenico Baldari allowed the locals to seek sanctuary within Santa Maria del Principio. According to locals, the statue was placed between the comune and the slowly approaching lava, and the locals invoked the protection of Saint George, and Mary the Immaculate, and the lava approached to the outskirts of the town and then stopped. In honour of their being saved, the parishioners of Santa Maria del Principio held another procession in the presence of the Cardinal of Naples Sisto Riario Sforza.This tradition remains alive nowadays, since on May 19 of every year - the day when traditionally lava was stopped - the statue of the Saint is brought in procession to the place of the event, thus celebrating the "Festa della Lava".

The later part of the 19th century saw San Giorgio a Cremano revert to a subsistence agriculture economy, with much of the commune's needs being supplied locally. Although many of the villas were abandoned, or even if still occupied, went un-maintained, many of them did remain well looked after, and as a result survive to this day. Although on a much smaller scale than in the 18th century, the natural environment and climate of San Giorgio a Cremano were such that tourism persisted to a lesser degree, and some of the resorts survived.

=== 20th century ===
The March 1944 eruption of Vesuvius, by Jack Reinhardt, B24 tailgunner in the USAAF during World War II

Little changed for the residents of San Giorgio a Cremano during the first half of the 20th century. The population had stagnated, but the localised agrarian and weaving economies persisted.

During the dark days of World War II, Mount Vesuvius erupted on 22 March 1944. Santa Maria del Principio's parish priest Don Giorgio Tarallo, repeated the offer of refuge within the church, and as in 1855 the statue of Saint George was used to protect the commune from the approaching lava. The lava reached virtually all the way to the steps of the church before stopping (at zone via Amendola). Another procession was added ten years later in honour of the 'miracle'. In 1968 under the parish priest Don Francesco Sannino the two processions of the first and second Sunday of May were reduced to one on the second Sunday of May. In 1972, with the parish priest Don Pasquale Ascione changed the main procession to the fourth Sunday of May.

By the second half of the 20th century, the central part of Naples could no longer withstand the post-war population growth, and residents began to increasingly move into neighbouring communes to the south, such as Portici or San Giorgio a Cremano. The large derelict residential areas of the former stately homes and apartments were ripe for development, and many fine homes were knocked down, often illegally, to make way for new housing developments. From 1951 to 1981 the population of San Giorgio a Cremano more than tripled.

According to the Commerce Office of the Municipality of San Giorgio a Cremano, in 1970 there still existed 58 weavers within the commune but at the present time are all definitely closed.

The Camorra were once again at the forefront of the illegal building and development industry. The authorities soon realised what was happening, and the saw the risk to existing cultural heritage, and stamped down upon the illegal constructions, which the Camorra simply moved their developments from previously occupied land into either the red zones (areas where the government had banned development due to the dangers posed by an eruption) on the slopes of Vesuvius, or they developed housing on land which they had used previously for illegal waste dumping, often making the ground unstable, and unusable for development in connection with local mayors and bureaucrats used to take money to close all two eyes. Undercutting the tenders of other contractors, the Camorra would first excavate and sell the volcanic pozzuolana, used in the construction industry, and then refill the cavities with tons of refuse and toxic waste, often imported from northern Italy, before recovering the waste and selling the land illegally for housing construction and residential development. It has been estimated that this industry was worth upwards of 11 billion euro a year to the Camorra. Anyway, it is impossible to trace a clear line of demarcation between local government and criminal associations for the simple reason that sometimes they work together for the same strike.

This has led to an unfortunate situation in San Giorgio a Cremano, where some of the illegal developments have been left half built, leaving unsightly concrete skeletons, or land that had been cleared for development has been left unused, leaving open spaces in an increasingly crowded commune.

Despite the illegal developments, many new legal apartment buildings were also constructed, particularly in the 1970s and 1980s. The sometimes quite fine apartments of five or six stories were constructed along tree-lined widened avenues such as Via Guglielmo Marconi and Via San Martino, and the area soon became known affectionately amongst local residents as Piccola Parigi ('Little Paris').

=== 21st century ===
San Giorgio a Cremano is primarily a residential commune; however, despite the large area of the commune that is occupied by high-density apartment buildings, small scale agriculture still prevails upon sections of private land.

Like many parts of Naples, the commune of San Giorgio a Cremano has suffered badly in the years around 2008 from the crippling garbage crisis that has affected the whole city. Particularly during festive seasons such as Easter and Christmas, large piles of uncollected garbage have regularly been allowed to build up in the streets, creating an unsightly image and a serious health concern. As with other parts of the city, the frustration of local residents has sometimes boiled over in the form of them setting fire to the piles, which often contain chemicals and plastics that give off toxic fumes, creating a further health hazard, and posing a serious threat to firemen called to tackle the dangerous blazes.

After having suffered for some months, San Giorgio a Cremano was one of the first communes of the Province of Naples to engage population in an extensive campaign of garbage differentiation. Traditional indifferentiate garbage collecting boxes were removed from the streets, and it was started up a new system, according to which different materials are collected door-to-door in different days. The new approach was so efficacious that San Giorgio was awarded a €480,000 prize by the Campania Region for being a benchmark for the whole area, with a differentiated garbage collection quota reaching a value of 65% in 2012, thus topping the ranking of the Province of Naples.

In July 2008, San Giorgio a Cremano was selected by Poste Italiane to be one of several communes around Italy to participate in an experimental pilot scheme in which citizens are able to apply for official certificates and documents using a 'digital stamp' system.

== Geography ==
San Giorgio a Cremano is located on the foothills to the west of the Vesuvius and the sea. With a total area of 4.11 km^{2} (1.6 sq mi), it is a fairly small, cramped comune which runs in a narrow corridor from the slopes of the volcano down toward the Bay of Naples. The highest point in the comune is 107 metres above sea level, and the lowest point is eight metres above sea level, giving an altimetric difference of 97 metres from the coastward side of the comune (west) to the inland side (east). The average height within the comune is 56 metres above sea level.

San Giorgio is also geographically surrounded by major roads on all sides. The coastal road of Corso San Giovanni follows the shoreline to the west of San Giorgio, and the Autostrada (motorway) Napoli-Salerno (E45, which also becomes the A3) runs to the north-east of San Giorgio.

=== Adjacent municipalities ===
To the east, San Giorgio a Cremano faces Vesuvius, which dominates the view in that direction. As the commune climbs uphill from west to east, many houses within San Giorgio have views over the Bay of Naples to the west. The main centre of Naples is located 6 kilometres to the north-west of San Giorgio. The town is bordered by Barra to the north, San Giovanni a Teduccio to the north-west, the Bay of Naples to the west, Ercolano and Portici to the south, and San Sebastiano al Vesuvio to the east. Nearby to the south is Ercolano, which is home to the famous archaeological site of Herculaneum, Pompeii's neighbouring Roman town, that was also destroyed by the eruption of Vesuvius in 79CE.

=== Climate ===
San Giorgio a Cremano, as with the rest of Naples is located at 40°N facing the Bay of Naples on the west side of the Italian Peninsula. This location gives the region a typical Mediterranean climate with mild, wet winters caused by the outer edges of polar fronts, and warm to hot, dry summers, due to the domination of the subtropical high pressure systems, according to the Köppen classification (Csa/Csb). The west coast tends to be slightly wetter than the east coast, with the southern 'Sirocco' wind bringing higher humidity and precipitation.

The proximity of the Bay of Naples sometimes moderates high summer temperatures with off-shore breezes, although temperatures in excess of 30°C are common in summer months, and July tends on average, to be the hottest month of the year. The warm temperatures and moderate to low precipitation led to the area's popularity as a tourist resort during the Renaissance and in early modern times. Whilst Mount Vesuvius is susceptible to snow covers in winter that cause the temperature in the commune to drop into the low single digit figures, winters do tend to be quite mild, with sunny days commonly experienced.

Climate data for San Giorgio a Cremano
Month	Jan	Feb	Mar	Apr	May	Jun	Jul	Aug	Sep	Oct	Nov	Dec	Year
Mean daily maximum °C (°F)	12 (54)	12 (54)	15 (59)	17 (63)	22 (72)	26 (79)	29 (84)	29 (84)	26 (79)	21 (70)	16 (61)	13 (55)	20 (68)
Mean daily minimum °C (°F)	4 (39)	5 (41)	6 (43)	8 (46)	12 (54)	16 (61)	18 (64)	18 (64)	16 (61)	12 (54)	8 (46)	5 (41)	11 (52)
Average precipitation mm (inches)	90 (3.5)	80 (3.1)	70 (2.8)	70 (2.8)	50 (2.0)	30 (1.2)	20 (0.8)	30 (1.2)	70 (2.8)	130 (5.1)	120 (4.7)	110 (4.3)	940 (37.0)
Source: Weatherbase

== Demographics ==
Historical population
Year	Pop.	±%
1861	3,693	—
1871	4,102	+11.1%
1881	4,853	+18.3%
1901	5,978	+23.2%
1911	7,309	+22.3%
1921	9,302	+27.3%
1931	12,026	+29.3%
1936	13,023	+8.3%
1951	17,922	+37.6%
1961	22,423	+25.1%
1971	45,635	+103.5%
1981	62,129	+36.1%
1991	62,258	+0.2%
2001	50,763	−18.5%
2011	45,523	−10.3%
2021	43,057	−5.4%
Source: ISTAT

As of 2026, the population is 41,585, of which 47.1% are male, and 52.9% are female. Minors make up 14.8% of the population, and seniors make up 26.0%.

As of 2001, 6,103 people from San Giorgio a Cremano are in full-time work within the commune, which is a total of 12.02%, and the most common form of employment is within the service industry, which makes up 30.43% of all work within the commune.

=== Immigration ===
As of 2025, immigrants make up 2.0% of the population. The 5 largest foreign countries of birth are Ukraine, Germany, Brazil, Georgia, and Romania.

== Government ==
San Giorgio a Cremano city hall located facing Piazza Vittorio Emanuele is the seat of local government

As a comune within the Province of Naples, San Giorgio a Cremano is run by a local council (Consiglio Comunale) that consists of a mayor (Sindaco) and a committee of aldermen (Assessore comunale). The current mayor is Giorgio Zinno of the Democratic Party. The council meets at San Giorgio a Cremano City Hall which is located facing Piazza Carlo di Borbone, formerly Piazza Vittorio Emanuele, at the end of Corso Roma, one of the main central streets of San Giorgio a Cremano.

== Crime ==
Like all comunes of Italy, San Giorgio a Cremano is home to a Carabinieri base. They are responsible for national security within the region. Crime prevention and detection duties are shared between the Polizia di Stato (State Police), and the Polizia Municipale di San Giorgio a Cremano.

Minor crime is quite unusual in San Giorgio a Cremano and major crimes like homicides are very rare. The residents of San Giorgio are very family and community oriented in general, and it remains quite a safe comune in which to live.

== Economy ==
Although primarily a residential area, the commune of San Giorgio a Cremano has maintained a local textiles industry since the Middle Ages, possibly as early as the 8th century. Threatened in recent times by cheap imported textiles from Asia, the local industry has managed to survive through the local economic support that can be found amongst Italian communities. Hand-weaving and industrial textile industries are both still found in the commune, and shirts and ties of a high quality which are exported internationally are manufactured there.

Likewise, small scale agriculture has resisted the pressure from high-density apartment developments, and small orchards and farms can be occasionally seem dotted throughout the commune. One of the few remaining heavier industries is canning, and there are several canning factories within the commune.

San Giorgio also has a strong retail sector, located primarily along the Via Manzoni and Via De Lauzieres, and in the streets around one of the main squares, Piazza Massimo Troisi and the Circumvesuviana station, many small retail outlets and fashion stores can be found. Streetside news stands, open-air fish-mongers and old-fashioned green-grocers are still a common sight mixed in with modern convenience stores and supermarkets. Many residents prefer to do their shopping locally, rather than take the rail link into central Naples.

== Culture ==
The commune of San Giorgio a Cremano has a typical Italian culture, similar to the rest of Naples. The commune is very community oriented, with the local football team well supported despite playing in a lower division. As with much of Italy, the residents of San Giorgio tend to be quite religious, and attendances at all of the commune's major Roman Catholic churches are quite high.

For festive occasions such as Easter, and Christmas residents can often be seen engaging in religious processions with great pageantry, the loud playing traditional music, songs, and folk dances. Dating back to at least the 16th or 17th century, but possibly much earlier, the procession forms and integral part of the religious lives of local residents.

A statue of Saint George is carried throughout the comune to bring good fortune, and ward of evils, but primarily to protect the comune from future eruptions of Mount Vesuvius. The processions are normally accompanied by local devotees of the Christian 'sect' of Saint George carrying the large statue of Saint George aloft at the head of the procession. It is said by locals that in the 1630s, the church of St. Maria del Principle received as a gift from Emmanuela Caracciolo Pignatelli, Duchess of Montecalvo, a new statue of St. George, half bust, and that is what they venerate today. However the statue depicts Saint George in crusader costume, so must date post-13th century. Whether the procession dates from the 8th century, or the 16th, it is now part of a long, well entrenched tradition embraced by local Sangiorgesi.

Festive seasons form an important element of the calendar throughout Italy, and especially so for the locals of San Giorgio a Cremano. New Year's Eve is greeted with displays of often high powered fireworks, and almost all residents engage is creating personal shows.

There are a variety of bars, restaurants and cafes in the commune, controibuting to a relatively vibrant nightlife, together with one major cinema, the Cinema Flaminio, and three theatres, Sonora Centro Musica, Associazione Teatrale Spazio Uno Per il Teatro, and Associazione Culturale Teatro Sanacore. There are also various live music venues, often located in bars.

=== Sports ===
The home ground of Polisportiva San Giorgio a Cremano, known as 'The Den' to locals, has a gravel pitch.

There is very little room for sporting facilities within the crowded commune of San Giorgio a Cremano, although some facilities do exist. A small stadium with a running track and grass field exists on Via Picenna. There is an artificial turf 5-a-side pitch located on Via Guglielmo Marconi. Next door to this pitch is a gymnasium. In Villa Bruno there is also a dedicated Bocce pitch, which is used by the older men of the commune.

The commune only has one major football team, known as Polisportiva San Giorgio a Cremano, who currently play in the Eccellenza Campania league, equivalent to the sixth highest division in Italian football, or the second highest amateur league. The club was founded in 1926, and play their home matches in the local "R. Paudice stadium" on Via Sandriana known affectionately as "The Den", which has a gravel pitch, and grandstands on one side and one end of the pitch with a total capacity of 1,200. Attendances for home matches are quite reasonable for the level of competition. San Giorgio play in all-maroon shirts, shorts and socks, and the club crest is a vertical oval shape with a maroon circle in the centre. Inside the circle is a depiction of Saint George on horseback, above the circle is the name "San Giorgio" and underneath, the year of the club's foundation, "1926".

=== Media ===
San Giorgio a Cremano receives all the major Italian television channels as well as all of the major Italian radio stations. Quite often English language television signals that are broadcast from the nearby NATO base can be picked up throughout the comune. All of the major Italian daily newspapers are available regularly in San Giorgio a Cremano. Some International newspapers such as International Herald Tribune and the Daily Mail (English), Bild and Die Welt (German), and Le Monde (French), as well as some English magazines can often be found as well.

Film is an important part of the local culture, and the celebrated Italian comic actor Massimo Troisi, originally from San Giorgio a Cremano, is commemorated in the first week of July when the Massimo Troisi Prize, a comic film festival is held locally in his honour. San Giorgio a Cremano is also home to the Nick La Rocca European Jazz Festival.

Local folk music has long been a part of the local traditions. Neapolitan music is distinctive, a very popular throughout the province, including within San Giorgio a Cremano.

=== Famous citizens ===
- Luca Giordano (1635–1705), Baroque artist; besides his house, a chapel dedicated to him is located in San Giorgio a Cremano
- Bernardo Tanucci (1698–1783), politician and statesman of the Kingdom of Two Sicilies
- Guglielmo Massaia (1809–1889), Roman Catholic missionary and cardinal
- Maria Grazia Tarallo (1866–1912), Roman Catholic nun who bwas beatified in 2006
- E. A. Mario (1884–1961), poet and songwriter
- Alighiero Noschese (1932–1979), actor, comedian and impressionist
- Massimo Troisi (1953–1994), actor, comedian director and screenwriter
- La Niña (born 1991), musician and actress

== Main sights ==
Villa Bruno is one of San Giorgio a Cremano's most famous landmarks

The silver dome of Ill Tempio della Madonna dominates the centre of San Giorgio a Cremano, it is also referred to as the Temple of the Queen of the Lilies

San Giorgio a Cremano is a primarily residential commune, meaning much of the cityscape is dominated by apartment buildings. There are some notable features of the commune.

San Giorgio is home to five churches Church of San Giorgio Vecchio, Church of Santa Maria del Principio, Church of Saint Anne, Church of St. Anthony of Padua and the Ill Tempio della Madonna (Temple of the Madonna, Queen of the Lilies).

There are a number of nearby villas (as listed below), the so-called Vesuvian Villas, the most notable of which are Villa Bruno, Villa Vannucchi and Villa Pignatelli all of which were built by architect Ferdinando Sanfelice.

Various architectural types can be found throughout San Giorgio a Cremano, and the commune certainly represents a harmonic blend of several different eras of construction. Many new (sometimes incomplete and abandoned) structures sit alongside apartment blocks from the 19th century or earlier. Stark fascist era modernist architecture is less common than within Naples, but can be seen.

Other Villas in San Giorgio a Cremano include:

- Villa Avallone ora Tufarelli
- Villa Bonocore
- Villa Borrelli
- Villa Bruno
- Villa Caracciolo di Forino
- Villa Carafa of Percuoco
- Villa Carsana
- Villa Cerbone
- Villa Cosenza
- Villa F. Galante
- Villa GA Galante
- Villa Giarrusso e Maria
- Villa Giulia o de Marchi
- Villa Jesu
- Villa Leone
- Villa Lignola
- Villa Marulli
- Villa Marullier
- Villa Menale
- Villa Olimpia
- Villa Pignatelli di Montecalvo
- Villa Pizzicato
- Villa Righi
- Villa Salvetella
- Villa Sinicropi
- Villa Tanucci
- Villa di Sotto Tufarelli
- Villa Ummarino
- Villa Vannucchi
- Villa Zampaglione

== Infrastructure ==
San Giorgio a Cremano is one of the most densely populated areas in Europe, and therefore space for housing is at a premium. As of 2008, there was 17,017 housing units within the commune's area of 4.11 km^{2} (1.6 sq mi). Most residents of San Giorgio live in high density apartment buildings, usually within complexes that may consist of up to 50 apartments.

=== Transport ===
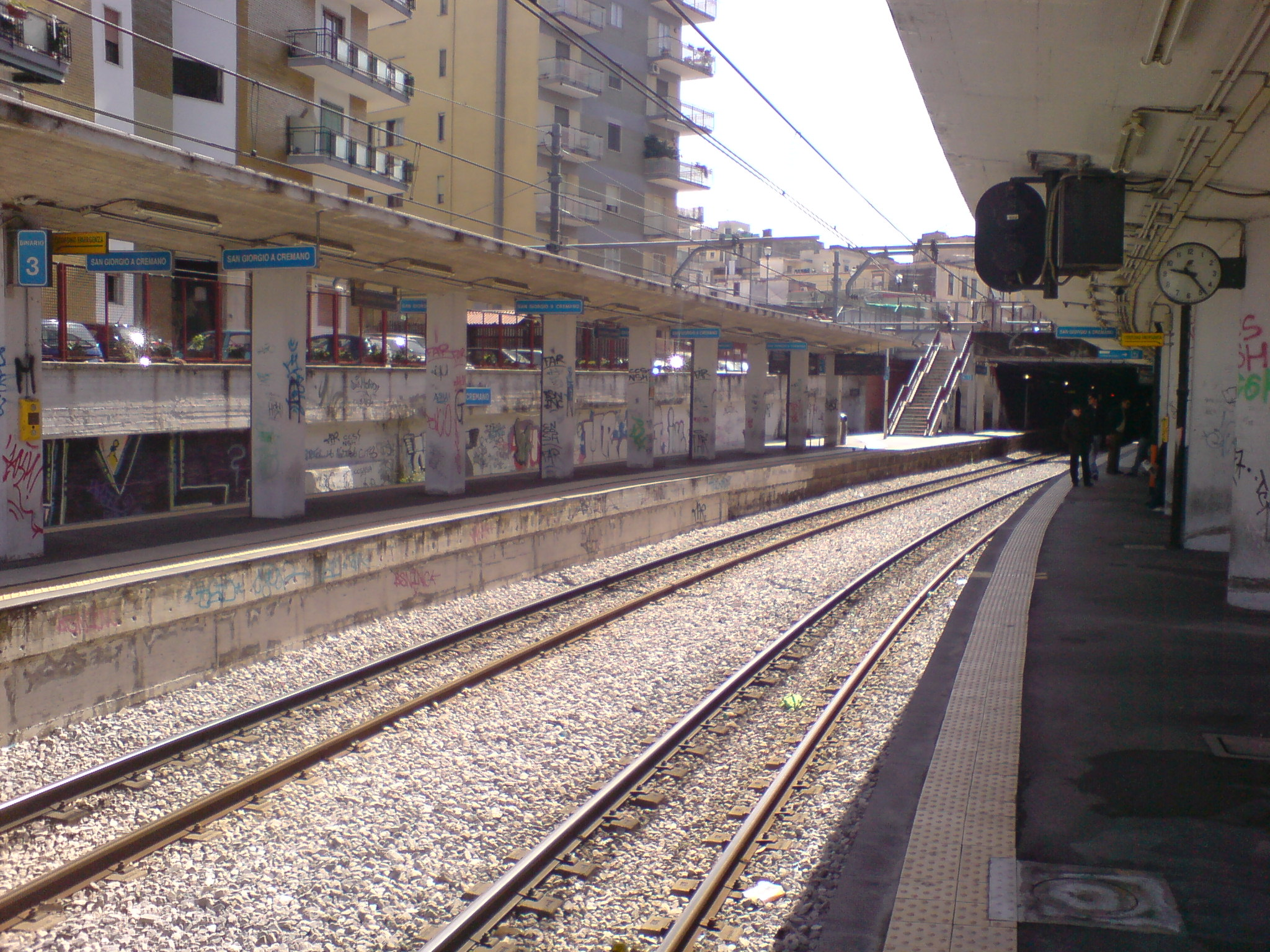
Stazione San Giorgio a Cremano is the comune's main rail link, and Circumvesuviana trains on Linea 3 and Linea 6 pass through

San Giorgio a Cremano benefits from a strategic position in the regional transport network, allowing direct access to key archaeological and touristic sites such as Pompei, Herculaneum, Sorrento, Naples making it a convenient base for exploring the broader Campania region.The main public transportation in San Giorgio a Cremano are: by Trenitalia railway Napoli-Salerno as well as the Circumvesuviana rail lines 3 and 6, for which there is a stop in San Giorgio a Cremano. Moreover, bus routes 156 Piazza Garibaldi – Via Manzoni (San Giorgio a Cremano); 159 Piazza Municipio (Cercola) – Via Alveo (Ercolano); 175 Palazza IACP (Pollena) – Via Brin. Services between San Giorgio, Naples, Salerno are regular and quite reliable, and with many residents commuting to Naples for work.

San Giorgio a Cremano Station was opened on the original Naples – Poggiomarino line, but was unpopular and soon neglected. The station was soon after becoming very dilapidated, and in major need of renovation. However it was improved with the electrification of the network, and again in the 1990s when major renovations were undertaken. The track area was widened, and a platform on Line 3 was added, with an overpass for access.

=== Utilities ===
There are no local utilities providers in San Giorgio a Cremano, or indeed Naples. The major utility suppliers in Italy have now officially all been privatised, but the majority of supply still comes from the old formerly state-run monopolies. Italians tend to be conservative in choosing suppliers, and so the old government suppliers still tend to be preferred by consumers unwilling to switch to alternative providers.

The major telecommunications provider throughout Italy is Telecom Italia, which although now privatised, is protected from competition by regulation allowing it to continue to monopolise the provision of such service. Telecom Italia is also a popular provider of mobile service under the brand banner of Telecom Italia Mobile, more commonly referred to as TIM, and also provides internet services under the brand Alice. TIM is also the primary holder of three Italian television stations, La7, MTV Italy, and QOOB.

The major electricity supplier is Ente Nazionale per l'energia ELettrica (ENEL), which although also privatised, is subject to strict governmental controls. It has an annual revenue of €38.153 billion, making it the third largest energy provider in the world. Electricity supply can be unpredictable in the Naples region, although has been more regular in recent years. Residential power supply generally provided between 1.5 kW and 6 kW, although commercial premised and industries are supplied at higher wattages. Most Italian homes run at 3 kW, which often results in blown fuses if too much demand is placed on the supply. Gas provision has slightly more choice for the consumer than electricity, but surprisingly tends to be more expensive. SIG and Italgas are the major suppliers, and most properties in San Giorgio a Cremano are connected to mains supply, although bomboli, or small portable gas canisters are still used by some residents.

Water is supplied through Azienda Comunale Energia e Ambiente (ACEA), and prices are fixed locally by the comune. Most residents in San Giorgio a Cremano have metered water supply.

== Education ==
There are 22 schools in San Giorgio a Cremano catering for the high population density. Of these there are 14 State, or government schools, and 8 are privates schools, most of which have religious affiliations to the Catholic faith.

Further Education facilities include the Scuola di Lingue ('British' Language School), L'Arcobaleno primary school, Istituto A. Manzoni Srl, Istituto Regina Mundi Suore Di Maria Ss. Addolorata, Istituto Tecnico Industriale, Liceo Scientifico Statale San Giorgio A Cremano, Pia Unione A.M.I., Scuola Materna, Scuola Materna I Cuccioli, Scuola Media Statale G. D Orso Presidenza, Scuola Media Statale Marconi, Scuole Pubbliche, Suore Di Carita' Materna Beatrice D'Amato, Scuola Auto Moto Nautica Di Manda Carla, Comune Di San Giorgio A Cremano Scuola Elementare, and Scuola Delta Di Vitiello Giulia & C. S.A.S.

San Giorgio a Cremano is directly served by a university within the comune, but many students from within the comune attend one of the four major universities located within Naples itself. These universities are: University of Naples Federico II (Italian: Università degli Studi di Napoli Federico II), Second University of Naples (Italian: Seconda Università degli Studi di Napoli), Naples Eastern University (Italian: Università degli Studi di Napoli "L'Orientale), Parthenope University of Naples (Italian: Università degli Studi di Napoli "Parthenope"), and Suor Orsola Benincasa University of Naples (Italian: Università degli Studi Suor Orsola Benincasa – Napoli).
