= List of films about the unification of Italy =

Below is an incomplete list of feature films, television films or television series which include events of the unification of Italy (Risorgimento). This list does not include documentaries, short films.

== 1910s ==
Year	Country	Main title (Alternative title)	Original title (Original script)	Director	Subject
1912	Italy	A Sicilian Heroine	I mille	Alberto Degli Abbati	Drama. Giuseppe Garibaldi
1918	Italy		Tosca	Alfredo De Antoni	Drama. Based on the play La Tosca. Battle of Marengo

== 1920s ==
Year	Country	Main title (Alternative title)	Original title (Original script)	Director	Subject
1922	Weimar Republic	Vanina	Vanina oder Die Galgenhochzeit	Arthur von Gerlach	Drama. Based on the short story Vanina Vanini.
1927	Italy	The martyrs of Italy	I martiri d'Italia	Domenico Gaido	
1928	Soviet Union	The Gadfly	Овод კრაზანა	Kote Marjanishvili	Action, Adventure, Drama, Romance, War. Based on a novel The Gadfly.

== 1930s ==
Year	Country	Main title (Alternative title)	Original title (Original script)	Director	Subject
1934	Italy	1860		Alessandro Blasetti	Drama, History. Giuseppe Garibaldi, Landing at Marsala, Battle of Calatafimi, Expedition of the Thousand
1934	Italy	Villafranca		Giovacchino Forzano	Based on the play Villafranca. Camillo Benso, Count of Cavour, Victor Emmanuel II
1934	Italy	Loyalty of Love	Teresa Confalonieri	Guido Brignone	Drama. Based on the play Il conte Aquila. Teresa Casati, Federico Confalonieri.
1935	Italy	I Love You Only	Amo te sola	Mario Mattoli	Comedy. Based on the play Il gatto in cantina.
1937	Italy	Doctor Antonio	Il dottor Antonio	Enrico Guazzoni	Drama. Based on a novel Doctor Antonio.
1939	Italy	The Knight of San Marco	Il cavaliere di San Marco	Gennaro Righelli	

== 1940s ==
Year	Country	Main title (Alternative title)	Original title (Original script)	Director	Subject
1940	Italy	Beyond Love	Oltre l'amore	Carmine Gallone	Drama. Based on the short story Vanina Vanini.
1941	Italy	The Story of Tosca	Tosca	Carl Koch	Drama, Musical. Based on the play La Tosca. Battle of Marengo
1941	Italy	Old-Fashioned World	Piccolo mondo antico	Mario Soldati	Drama. Based on a novel The Little World of the Past.
1942	Italy	The Countess of Castiglione	La contessa Castiglione	Flavio Calzavara	Drama, History. Virginia Oldoini, Countess of Castiglione
1942	Italy	A Garibaldian in the Convent	Un garibaldino al convento	Vittorio De Sica	Comedy, Drama. Expedition of the Thousand
1942	Italy	Luisa Sanfelice		Leo Menardi	Drama. Based on a novel La Sanfelice. Luisa Sanfelice
1945	Italy		All'ombra della gloria	Pino Mercanti	Drama, History.
1949	Italy	The Mill on the Po	Il mulino del Po	Alberto Lattuada	Drama, History. Based on a novel Il mulino del Po.
1949	Italy	Dead Woman's Kiss	Il bacio di una morta	Guido Brignone	Drama, War. Based on the novel Il bacio d'una morta.

== 1950s ==
Year	Country	Main title (Alternative title)	Original title (Original script)	Director	Subject
1950	Italy	The Count of Saint Elmo	Il Conte di Sant'Elmo	Guido Brignone	Drama.
1950	Italy	Cavalcade of Heroes	Cavalcata d'eroi	Mario Costa	Siege of Rome (1849)
1952	Italy; France	Red Shirts	Camicie rosse	Goffredo Alessandrini; Francesco Rosi	Drama, History. Anita Garibaldi
1952	Italy	They Were Three Hundred	Eran trecento	Gian Paolo Callegari	Drama, History. Sapri Expedition
1952	Italy	The Secret of Three Points	Il segreto delle tre punte	Carlo Ludovico Bragaglia	Adventure, Romance.
1952	Italy	Lieutenant Giorgio	Il Tenente Giorgio	Raffaello Matarazzo	Drama. Based on a novel Il tenente Giorgio.
1953	Italy	The Life and Music of Giuseppe Verdi	Giuseppe Verdi	Raffaello Matarazzo	Biography, Drama, Music, Romance. Giuseppe Verdi
1954	France; Italy	The Contessa's Secret	La Castiglione; La Contessa di Castiglione	Georges Combret	Drama, History, Romance. Virginia Oldoini, Countess of Castiglione
1954	Italy; France	House of Ricordi	Casa Ricordi	Carmine Gallone	Biography, Drama, Music, Romance. Casa Ricordi
1954	Italy	Senso		Luchino Visconti	Drama, Romance, War. Based on a novel Senso.
1954	Italy	100 Years of Love	Cento anni d'amore	Lionello De Felice	Comedy, Drama, Romance, War. Battle of Monterotondo
1954	Italy		La pattuglia sperduta	Piero Nelli	
1955	Soviet Union	The Gadfly	Овод	Aleksandr Faintsimmer	Action, Drama, History. Based on a novel The Gadfly.
1955	Italy	Count Aquila	Il conte Aquila	Guido Salvini	Based on the play Il conte Aquila. Teresa Casati, Federico Confalonieri
1955	Italy		Un giglio infranto	Giorgio Walter Chili	Drama, History. Based on the play I congiurati di Belfiore.
1956	Italy	Tosca		Carmine Gallone	Drama, Musical, Romance. Based on the play La Tosca. Battle of Marengo

== 1960s ==
Year	Country	Main title (Alternative title)	Original title (Original script)	Director	Subject
1961	Italy; France	The Betrayer	Vanina Vanini	Roberto Rossellini	Drama. Based on the short story Vanina Vanini.
1961	Italy; France	Garibaldi	Viva l'Italia!	Roberto Rossellini	Drama, History. Giuseppe Garibaldi, Expedition of the Thousand
1963	Italy; France	The Leopard	Il Gattopardo	Luchino Visconti	Drama, History. Based on a novel The Leopard.
1965	Italy	Sons of the Leopard	I figli del leopardo	Sergio Corbucci	Comedy. Parody of the movie The Leopard.
1969	Italy; France	The Conspirators	Nell'anno del Signore	Luigi Magni	Comedy, Drama, History.

== 1970s ==
Year	Country	Main title (Alternative title)	Original title (Original script)	Director	Subject
1970	Italy	Paths of War	Franco e Ciccio sul sentiero di guerra	Aldo Grimaldi	Comedy, Western.
1971	Italy	1870	Correva l'anno di grazia 1870	Alfredo Giannetti	Drama, History.
1971	Italy	My father monsignor	Mio padre monsignore	Antonio Racioppi	Comedy.
1971	Italy; Yugoslavia	Liberty	Bronte: cronaca di un massacro che i libri di storia non hanno raccontato	Florestano Vancini	Drama, History. The Events of Bronte, Nino Bixio
1972	Italy	St. Michael Had a Rooster	San Michele aveva un gallo	Paolo and Vittorio Taviani	Drama, History. Based on the short story The Divine and the Human.
1973	Italy	The Five Days	Le cinque giornate	Dario Argento	Comedy, Drama, History. Five Days of Milan
1973	Italy	La Tosca		Luigi Magni	Drama, Musical. Based on the play La Tosca. Battle of Marengo
1974	Italy	Allonsanfàn		Paolo and Vittorio Taviani	Drama, History.
1976	Italy	How Wonderful to Die Assassinated	Quanto è bello lu murire acciso	Ennio Lorenzini	Drama, History. Carlo Pisacane
1977	Italy	In the Name of the Pope King	In nome del papa re	Luigi Magni	Drama, History. Based on a novel I misteri del processo Monti e Tognetti. Giuseppe Monti, Gaetano Tognetti

== 1980s ==
Year	Country	Main title (Alternative title)	Original title (Original script)	Director	Subject
1980	Italy	The sharpshooters are arriving	Arrivano i bersaglieri	Luigi Magni	Comedy, Drama. Capture of Rome
1980	Romania	The Stake and the Flame	Rug și flacără	Adrian Petringenaru	War. Based on a novel Rug și flacără.
1981	Italy; France	Passion of Love	Passione d'amore	Ettore Scola	Drama, History, Romance. Based on a novel Fosca.
1986	Italy	Superfantozzi		Neri Parenti	Comedy.
1986	Soviet Union	The Mysterious Prisoner	Таинственный узник	Valeriu Gagiu	Adventure, Drama. Based on a novel Clad in Stone. Mikhail Beideman
1989	Italy	'O Re		Luigi Magni	Comedy, Drama, History. Maria Sophie of Bavaria, Francis II of the Two Sicilies

== 1990s ==
Year	Country	Main title (Alternative title)	Original title (Original script)	Director	Subject
1990	Italy; France; Germany	In the Name of the Sovereign People	In nome del popolo sovrano	Luigi Magni	Drama, History. First Italian War of Independence
1994	Italy	The Hero of Two Worlds	L'eroe dei due mondi	Guido Manuli	Animation.
1995	France	The Horseman on the Roof	Le hussard sur le toit	Jean-Paul Rappeneau	Adventure, Drama, Romance, War. Based on a novel The Horseman on the Roof. Angelo Pardi, 1826–1837 cholera pandemic
1999	Italy; France	Ferdinando and Carolina	Ferdinando e Carolina	Lina Wertmüller	Comedy, History. Ferdinand I of the Two Sicilies, Maria Carolina of Austria

== 2000s ==
Year	Country	Main title (Alternative title)	Original title (Original script)	Director	Subject
2000	Italy	La Carbonara		Luigi Magni	Drama. Carbonari
2001	Italy; France; United Kingdom; Germany	Tosca		Benoît Jacquot	Drama, Music, Musical. Based on the play La Tosca. Battle of Marengo
2004	Italy	The Remains of Nothing	Il resto di niente	Antonietta De Lillo	Drama, History. Based on a novel Il resto di niente. Eleonora Fonseca Pimentel, Parthenopean Republic
2006	Italy	Fire at My Heart	Fuoco su di me	Lamberto Lambertini	History. Joachim Murat
2007	Italy; Spain; Germany; United States	The Viceroys	I Viceré	Roberto Faenza	Drama, History. Based on a novel The Viceroys.
2007	Brazil; Italy	Anita, a Life for Garibaldi	Anita - Una vita per Garibaldi	Aurelio Grimaldi	Adventure, Drama, History. Anita Garibaldi

== 2010s ==
Year	Country	Main title (Alternative title)	Original title (Original script)	Director	Subject
2010	Italy; France	We Believed	Noi credevamo	Mario Martone	History. Based on the novel Noi credevamo. Young Italy

== 2020s ==
Year	Country	Main title (Alternative title)	Original title (Original script)	Director	Subject
2020	Italy	The Battle of Rome 1849	La battaglia di Roma 1849	Luigi Cozzi	History, War. Based on the novel Un garibaldino a casa Giacometti. Siege of Rome (1849)
2023	Italy; France; Germany	Kidnapped	Rapito	Marco Bellocchio	Drama, History. Based on the book Il caso Mortara. Mortara case
2023	Italian	Godfrey and Italy called	Goffredo e l'Italia chiamò	Angelo Antonucci	Goffredo Mameli
2025	Italy	The Illusion	L'abbaglio	Roberto Andò	Drama, History. Giuseppe Garibaldi, Vincenzo Giordano Orsini, Landing at Marsala, Battle of Calatafimi, Expedition of the Thousand

== Science fiction, fantasy, and horror films ==
Year	Country	Main title (Alternative title)	Original title (Original script)	Director	Subject
1974	Italy	The Kiss	Il bacio	Mario Lanfranchi	Drama, Horror. Based on the novel Il bacio d'una morta.

== Television films ==
Year	Country	Main title (Alternative title)	Original title (Original script)	Director	Subject
1963	East Germany	Vanina Vanini	Der furchtlose Rebell	Helmut Schiemann	Drama. Based on the short story Vanina Vanini.
1964	Italy	Antonello, Calabrian brigand leader	Antonello capobrigante calabrese	Ottavio Spadaro	Drama. Based on the play Antonello capobrigante calabrese. Bandiera brothers
1972	Italy		Giuseppe Mazzini	Pino Passalacqua	Biography, Drama, History. Giuseppe Mazzini
1976	Italy; West Germany		Tosca	Gianfranco De Bosio	Crime, Drama, Musical, Romance, Thriller. Based on the play La Tosca. Battle of Marengo
1987	Soviet Union	Rivares	Риварес	Bidzina Chkheidze	Music. Based on a novel The Gadfly.
2003	Italy	Pasquino's Night	La notte di Pasquino	Luigi Magni	Comedy.
2004	Italy; France	Luisa Sanfelice		Paolo and Vittorio Taviani	Drama, History, Romance. Based on a novel La Sanfelice. Luisa Sanfelice

== Television series ==
Year	Country	Main title (Alternative title)	Original title (Original script)	Director	Subject
1954	Italy	Doctor Antonio	Il dottor Antonio	Alberto Casella	Based on a novel Doctor Antonio.
1956	Italy		L'Alfiere	Anton Giulio Majano	Based on a novel L'Alfiere. Expedition of the Thousand
1957	Italy		Piccolo mondo antico	Silverio Blasi	Drama. Based on a novel The Little World of the Past.
1959	Italy		Il romanzo di un maestro	Mario Landi	Based on a novel Il romanzo di un maestro.
1959	Italy		Ottocento	Anton Giulio Majano	Drama. Based on a novel Ottocento and on the memoirs of Costantino Nigra.
1960	Italy		La Pisana	Giacomo Vaccari	Drama, History. Based on a novel Le confessioni d'un italiano.
1963	Italy		Il mulino del Po	Sandro Bolchi	Drama. Based on a novel Il mulino del Po.
1963-4	Italy		Giuseppe Verdi	Mario Ferrero	Giuseppe Verdi
1966	Italy		Luisa Sanfelice	Leonardo Cortese	Drama. Based on a novel La Sanfelice. Luisa Sanfelice
1967	Italy		Vita di Cavour	Piero Schivazappa	Biography, History. Camillo Benso, Count of Cavour
1968	Italy		Le mie prigioni	Sandro Bolchi	Drama. Based on the memoirs of Le mie prigioni. Silvio Pellico, The Maroncelli-Pellico Trial
1970	Italy		Le cinque giornate di Milano	Leandro Castellani	Five Days of Milan
1970	Italy		Napoli 1860 - La fine dei Borboni	Alessandro Blasetti	Drama. Expedition of the Thousand
1971	Italy		Il mulino del Po	Sandro Bolchi	Drama, History. Based on a novel Il mulino del Po.
1974	Italy; France; West Germany		Il giovane Garibaldi	Franco Rossi	Drama. Giuseppe Garibaldi
1980	Soviet Union	The Gadfly	Овод	Nikolai Mashchenko	Action, Drama, War. Based on a novel The Gadfly.
1981	Japan	The Story of Cuore, School of Love	愛の学校クオレ物語	Eiji Okabe	Animation, Drama, Family, History. Based on a novel Heart.
1982	Italy; France; West Germany; United Kingdom; Sweden	The Life of Verdi		Renato Castellani	Biography, Drama, Music, Romance. Giuseppe Verdi
1983	Italy		Piccolo mondo antico	Salvatore Nocita	Drama. Based on a novel The Little World of the Past.
1987	Italy; France; West Germany; Yugoslavia	Garibaldi the General	Il generale	Luigi Magni	Drama. Giuseppe Garibaldi
1994	Austria; Germany; France	Radetzky March	Radetzkymarsch	Axel Corti; Gernot Roll	Drama, History. Based on a novel Radetzky March.
2001	Italy; Germany	Tides of Change	Piccolo mondo antico	Cinzia TH Torrini	Drama. Based on a novel The Little World of the Past.
2001	Italy		Cuore	Maurizio Zaccaro	Drama. Based on a novel Heart.
2004	Italy		Le cinque giornate di Milano	Carlo Lizzani	Drama. Five Days of Milan
2004	Ukraine; China	The Gadfly	牛虻; Овод	Wu Tianming	Drama, History. Based on a novel The Gadfly.
2006	Italy; Spain; France		La contessa di Castiglione	Josée Dayan	Drama, History. Virginia Oldoini, Countess of Castiglione
2007	Italy		Eravamo solo mille	Stefano Reali	Drama. Expedition of the Thousand
2008	Italy		Il sangue e la rosa	Salvatore Samperi; Luciano Odorisio; Luigi Parisi	Drama. Based on a novel The Mysteries of Paris and on films about Angelica.
2012	Italy; Portugal; Bulgaria	Anita Garibaldi		Claudio Bonivento	Biography, Drama, History, Romance. Anita Garibaldi, Giuseppe Garibaldi
2012	Italy		Né con te né senza di te	Vincenzo Terracciano	Drama.
2013	Italy		L'ultimo papa re	Luca Manfredi	Comedy. Based on a novel I misteri del processo Monti e Tognetti. Giuseppe Monti, Gaetano Tognetti
2024	Italy		Mameli - Il ragazzo che sognò l'Italia	Luca Lucini; Ago Panini	History. Goffredo Mameli
2025	Italy; United Kingdom	The Leopard	Il gattopardo	Tom Shankland; Giuseppe Capotondi; Laura Luchetti	Drama, History. Based on a novel The Leopard.
2025	Italy; Belgium; France		Belcanto	Carmine Elia	Drama.

== Post-unification Italian brigandage ==
=== Films ===
Year	Country	Main title (Alternative title)	Original title (Original script)	Director	Subject
1952	Italy	The Bandit of Tacca Del Lupo	Il brigante di Tacca del Lupo	Pietro Germi	Action, Drama. Carmine Crocco
1962	Italy; France	The Italian Brigands	I briganti italiani	Mario Camerini	Drama, War.
1993	Italy	Bandits: Love and Liberty	Briganti - Amore e libertà	Marco Modugno	Drama.
1999	Italy	They called them... brigands!	Li chiamarono... briganti!	Pasquale Squitieri	Drama. Carmine Crocco
2018	Italy	The Grossi Gang	La banda Grossi	Claudio Ripalti	Adventure, Crime, Drama, History. Terenzio Grossi, Banda Grossi
2021	Italy	My Body Will Bury You	Il mio corpo vi seppellirà	Giovanni La Parola	Drama, History.

=== Television series ===
Year	Country	Main title (Alternative title)	Original title (Original script)	Director	Subject
1980	Italy		L'eredità della priora	Anton Giulio Majano	Drama. Based on a novel L'eredità della priora.
2012	Italy		Il generale dei briganti	Paolo Poeti	Drama, History. Carmine Crocco
2024	Italy	Brigands: The Quest for Gold	Briganti	Antonio Le Fosse; Steve Saint Leger; Nicola Sorcinelli	Action, Adventure, Drama, History.
