= List of films set during the French Revolution and French Revolutionary Wars =

Below is an incomplete list of feature films, television films or television series which include events of the French Revolution and French Revolutionary Wars. This list does not include documentaries, short films.

== 1910s ==
Year	Country	Main title (Alternative title)	Original title (Original script)	Director	Subject
1913	United States	Robespierre		Herbert Brenon	Drama.
1914	United States	Ireland a Nation		Walter MacNamara	Drama, History. Irish Rebellion of 1798
1914	United States	Charlotte Corday		William F. Adler	Drama, History.
1914	France	The Knight of Maison-Rouge	Le Chevalier de Maison-Rouge	Albert Capellani	Drama, History.
1915	United States	The Two Orphans		Herbert Brenon	Drama. Based on the play The Two Orphans.
1915	Denmark	The Heart of Lady Alaine	Revolutionsbryllup	August Blom	Drama. Based on the play Revolutionsbryllup.
1916	Italy	Storming of the Bastille	La presa della Bastiglia	Eleuterio Rodolfi	Historical drama. Storming of the Bastille
1916	Italy	Madame Guillotine	Madame Tallien	Enrico Guazzoni; Mario Caserini	Drama. Based on the play Madame Tallien.
1917	United States	The Scarlet Pimpernel		Richard Stanton	Adventure. Based on a novel The Scarlet Pimpernel.
1917	United States	Madame Du Barry		J. Gordon Edwards	Drama, History. Based on a novel Memoirs d’un médecin. Madame du Barry
1917	United States	A Tale of Two Cities		Frank Lloyd	Drama, History, Romance, War. Based on a novel A Tale of Two Cities.
1918	Italy		Tosca	Alfredo De Antoni	Drama. Based on the play La Tosca. Battle of Marengo
1919	Weimar Republic	Charlotte Corday		Frederic Zelnik	Drama, History.
1919	Weimar Republic	Madame Dubarry		Ernst Lubitsch	Biography, Drama, Romance. Madame du Barry
1919	United Kingdom	The Elusive Pimpernel		Maurice Elvey	Adventure, Drama. Based on a novel The Elusive Pimpernel.

== 1920s ==
Year	Country	Main title (Alternative title)	Original title (Original script)	Director	Subject
1920	France	Ninety-three	Quatre-vingt-treize	André Antoine; Albert Capellani; Léonard Antoine	Drama, History. Based on a novel Ninety-Three.
1920	Denmark	Leaves from Satan's Book	Blade af Satans bog	Carl Theodor Dreyer	Drama.
1921	United States	Orphans of the Storm		D. W. Griffith	Drama, History, Romance. Based on the play The Two Orphans.
1921	Weimar Republic	Danton		Dimitri Buchowetzki	Drama. Based on the play Danton's Death. Georges Danton
1922	France		Jocelyn	Léon Poirier	Drama, Romance. Based on the poem Jocelyn.
1922	Weimar Republic	Marie Antoinette, the Love of a King	Marie Antoinette – Das Leben einer Königin	Rudolf Meinert	Drama, History. Marie Antoinette
1923	United Kingdom; United States	I Will Repay		Henry Kolker	Adventure, Drama, History. Based on a novel I Will Repay.
1923	France	The Child King	L'Enfant-roi	Jean Kemm	Louis XVII
1923	United States	Scaramouche		Rex Ingram	Drama, Romance. Drama. Based on a novel Scaramouche.
1923	France	The Courier of Lyon	L'Affaire du courrier de Lyon	Léon Poirier	Drama, Historical. Courrier de Lyon case
1926	United Kingdom	The Only Way		Herbert Wilcox	Adventure, Drama. Based on a novel A Tale of Two Cities.
1927	France	Napoleon	Napoléon	Abel Gance	Biography, Drama, History, War. Napoleon
1928	Weimar Republic	The Last Night	Revolutionshochzeit	A.W. Sandberg	Drama. Based on the play Revolutionsbryllup.
1928	United Kingdom	The Triumph of the Scarlet Pimpernel		T. Hayes Hunter	Adventure, Drama, Romance, War. Based on a novel The Triumph of the Scarlet Pimpernel.

== 1930s ==
Year	Country	Main title (Alternative title)	Original title (Original script)	Director	Subject
1930	United States	Du Barry, Woman of Passion		Sam Taylor	Romance, Drama. Based on the play Du Barry. Madame du Barry
1930	United States	Captain of the Guard		John S. Robertson; Pál Fejös	Drama, Musical, Romance, War.
1931	United Kingdom	Madame Guillotine		Reginald Fogwell	History, Romance.
1931	Weimar Republic	Danton		Hans Behrendt	Drama. Georges Danton
1931	United Kingdom	The Lyons Mail		Arthur Maude	Mystery, Adventure. Based on the play The Lyons Mail. Courrier de Lyon case
1932	France	Danton		André Roubaud	History. Based on the play The Danton Case. Georges Danton
1933	France	The Two Orphans	Les deux orphelines	Maurice Tourneur	Drama. Based on a play The Two Orphans.
1934	United Kingdom	The Scarlet Pimpernel		Harold Young	Adventure, Drama. Based on a novel The Scarlet Pimpernel.
1935	United States	A Tale of Two Cities		Jack Conway	Drama, History, Romance. Based on a novel A Tale of Two Cities.
1936	United Kingdom	The Prisoner of Corbal		Karl Grune	Drama, History, Romance. Based on a novel The Nuptials of Corbal.
1936	France; Italy		Sous la terreur Fiordalisi d'oro	Marcel Cravenne; Giovacchino Forzano	
1937	France	The Courier of Lyon	L'affaire du courrier de Lyon	Claude Autant-Lara; Maurice Lehmann	Drama, History. Courrier de Lyon case
1937	United Kingdom	The Return of the Scarlet Pimpernel		Hanns Schwarz	Drama, History, Romance. Based on a novel The Scarlet Pimpernel.
1938	France	Let's go up the Champs-Élysées	Remontons les Champs-Élysées	Sacha Guitry; Robert Bibal	Comedy, Drama.
1938	Italy	The Count of Brechard	Il conte di Brechard	Mario Bonnard	Drama, History.
1938	France	La Marseillaise		Jean Renoir	Drama, History, Music, War.
1938	United States	Marie Antoinette		W. S. Van Dyke	Biography, Drama, History, Music, Romance. Based on a biography Marie Antoinette: The Portrait of an Average Woman. Marie Antoinette
1938	Nazi Germany	Revolutionary Wedding	Revolutionshochzeit	Hans H. Zerlett	Drama. Based on the play Revolutionsbryllup.
1939	France	The Three Drums	Les Trois Tambours	Maurice de Canonge	Drama, History, War. Based on an unknown novel. Battle of Valmy

== 1940s ==
Year	Country	Main title (Alternative title)	Original title (Original script)	Director	Subject
1940	United States	New Moon		Robert Z. Leonard; W. S. Van Dyke	Adventure, Music, Musical, Romance. Based on a operetta The New Moon.
1941	Italy	The Story of Tosca	Tosca	Carl Koch	Drama, Musical. Based on the play La Tosca. Battle of Marengo
1941	France		Madame Sans-Gêne	Roger Richebé	Comedy, Drama, History. Based on the play Madame Sans-Gêne. Catherine Hübscher
1942	Italy	Luisa Sanfelice		Leo Menardi	Drama. Based on a novel La Sanfelice. Luisa Sanfelice
1942	United Kingdom	The Young Mr. Pitt		Carol Reed	Biography, Drama, Romance, War. William Pitt the Younger
1942	France	Mlle. Desiree	Le Destin fabuleux de Désirée Clary	Sacha Guitry; René Le Hénaff	Comedy, Drama, History. Désirée Clary
1942	Italy	The Two Orphans	Le due orfanelle	Carmine Gallone	Drama. Based on the play The Two Orphans.
1944	Mexico	The Two Orphans	Las dos huérfanas	José Benavides hijo	Drama, Family. Based on the play The Two Orphans.
1945	France	Pamela	Paméla	Pierre de Hérain	Drama. Based on the play Pamela.
1945	Italy	The blacksmith of the convent	Il fabbro del convento	Max Calandri	Adventure. Based on a novel Le Forgeron de la Cour-Dieu.
1946	United States	The Fighting Guardsman		Henry Levin	Action, Adventure, Drama, Romance. Based on a novel The Companions of Jehu.
1946	United Kingdom	The Laughing Lady		Paul L. Stein	Drama, Musical. Based on an unknown play.
1947	United Kingdom	Escape Dangerous		Digby Smith	
1947	France	The Royalists	Les Chouans	Henri Calef	Adventure, History. Based on a novel Les Chouans. Chouannerie
1948	France	The Lame Devil	Le Diable boiteux	Sacha Guitry	Biography, Drama, History. Charles Maurice de Talleyrand-Périgord
1949	United States	The Fighting O'Flynn		Arthur Pierson	Action, Adventure, Romance, Thriller, War. Based on the play The Fighting O'Flynn. French expedition to Ireland (1796)
1949	United States	Reign of Terror		Anthony Mann	History, Romance, Thriller, War. Maximilien Robespierre

== 1950s ==
Year	Country	Main title (Alternative title)	Original title (Original script)	Director	Subject
1950	United Kingdom	The Elusive Pimpernel		Michael Powell; Emeric Pressburger	Adventure, Drama, Romance. Based on a novel The Scarlet Pimpernel.
1951	France	Darling Caroline	Caroline Chérie	Richard Pottier	Comedy. Based on a novel The loves of Caroline Cherie: A novel.
1952	United States	Scaramouche		George Sidney	Action, Adventure, Comedy, Drama, Romance. Based on a novel Scaramouche.
1953	Soviet Union	Attack from the Sea	Корабли штурмуют бастионы	Mikhail Romm	Biography, Drama, War. Fyodor Ushakov, Siege of Corfu (1798–1799)
1953	France	A Caprice of Darling Caroline	Un caprice de Caroline chérie	Jean Devaivre	Romance, War. Based on a novel Un caprice de Caroline chérie.
1953	United Kingdom; United States	Sea Devils		Raoul Walsh	Action, Adventure, Drama, History. Based on a novel Toilers of the Sea.
1953	Italy	The Knight of Maison Rouge	Il cavaliere di Maison Rouge	Vittorio Cottafavi	Adventure, History. Based on a novel Le Chevalier de Maison-Rouge.
1954	United States	Désirée		Henry Koster	Biography, Drama, History, Romance. Based on a novel Désirée.
1954	France; Italy	Royal Affairs in Versailles	Si Versailles m'était conté	Sacha Guitry	Comedy, Drama, History. Palace of Versailles
1954	France	Cadet Rousselle		André Hunebelle	Adventure, Comedy.
1954	France; Italy	The rebels of Lomanach	Les Révoltés de Lomanach	Richard Pottier	Adventure. War in the Vendée
1954	Italy; France	The Two Orphans	Le due orfanelle	Giacomo Gentilomo	Adventure, Drama. Based on the play The Two Orphans.
1955	France; Italy	Napoléon		Sacha Guitry	Biography, Drama, War.
1955	France; Spain	Cavalrymen	Les Hussards	Alex Joffé	Comedy. Based on the play Les Hussards.
1955	France; Italy	Andrea Chénier		Clemente Fracassi	Drama. Based on an opera Andrea Chénier. André Chénier
1956	Italy	Tosca		Carmine Gallone	Drama, Musical, Romance. Based on the play La Tosca. Battle of Marengo
1956	France	If Paris Were Told to Us	Si Paris nous était conté	Sacha Guitry	Comedy, Drama, History.
1956	France; Italy	Marie Antoinette Queen of France	Marie-Antoinette reine de France	Jean Delannoy	Drama, History. Marie Antoinette
1957	United Kingdom	Dangerous Exile		Brian Desmond Hurst	Adventure, Drama, Romance. Louis XVII
1958	United Kingdom	A Tale of Two Cities		Ralph Thomas	Drama, History, Romance, War. Based on a novel A Tale of Two Cities.
1968	Soviet Union	Mameluke	Мамлюк მამლუქი	David Rondeli	Action, Adventure, Romance, War. Based on the novella Mameluke. French campaign in Egypt and Syria

== 1960s ==
Year	Country	Main title (Alternative title)	Original title (Original script)	Director	Subject
1961	Spain; Italy; France	Madame	Madame Sans-Gêne	Christian-Jaque	Comedy, Drama, Romance, War. Based on the play Madame Sans-Gêne. Catherine Hübscher
1961	France; Italy	Dialogue of the Carmelites	Le dialogue des Carmélites; I dialoghi delle Carmelitane	Raymond Léopold Bruckberger; Philippe Agostini	Drama, History. Based on the play Dialogues des carmélites. Martyrs of Compiègne
1962	United Kingdom	Billy Budd		Peter Ustinov	Adventure, Drama, War. Based on the play Billy Budd
1962	United Kingdom	H.M.S. Defiant		Lewis Gilbert	Action, Drama, History, War. Based on a novel Mutiny.
1962	Italy; France	Women of Devil's Island	Le prigioniere dell'isola del diavolo L'île aux filles perdues	Domenico Paolella	Action, Adventure, Drama.
1963	France; Italy; Spain	The Adventures of Scaramouche	Scaramouche; La máscara de Scaramouche	Antonio Isasi-Isasmendi	Adventure. Based on a novel Scaramouche.
1964	France; Italy; Spain	The Black Tulip	La Tulipe noire	Christian-Jaque	Action, Adventure, Comedy. Based on a novel The Black Tulip.
1965	France; Italy	The Two Orphans	Les Deux orphelines	Riccardo Freda	Drama. Based on the play The Two Orphans.
1966	Italy	The two sans-culottes	I due sanculotti	Giorgio Simonelli	Comedy.
1966	Italy; France; Spain	Red roses for Angelica	Rose rosse per Angelica	Steno	Adventure. Based on a novel Le Chevalier de Maison-Rouge.
1967	France; Italy; Romania	Seven Guys and one slut	Sept hommes et une garce	Bernard Borderie	Adventure.
1967	Italy	The Rover	L'avventuriero	Terence Young	Adventure, Drama, History, War. Based on a novel The Rover.
1967	United Kingdom	Don't Lose Your Head		Gerald Thomas	Action, Adventure, Comedy. Based on a novel The Scarlet Pimpernel.
1967	United Kingdom	Marat/Sade		Peter Brook	Drama, History, Music. Based on the play Marat/Sade. Marquis de Sade, Jean-Paul Marat, Charlotte Corday
1968	Italy; West Germany; France; United States	Emma Hamilton	Le calde notti di Lady Hamilton	Christian-Jaque	Drama, History, Romance. Based on a novel La Sanfelice. Emma, Lady Hamilton, Horatio Nelson, 1st Viscount Nelson
1968	France; Italy; West Germany	Darling Caroline	Caroline chérie	Denys de La Patellière	Drama, History. Based on a novel Darling Caroline.
1969	East Germany	Maid, I like you	Jungfer, Sie gefällt mir	Günter Reisch	Comedy. Based on the play The Broken Jug.

== 1970s ==
Year	Country	Main title (Alternative title)	Original title (Original script)	Director	Subject
1970	United States	Start the Revolution Without Me		Bud Yorkin	Comedy, History. Based on a novels A Tale of Two Cities, The Corsican Brothers, The Vicomte of Bragelonne: Ten Years Later.
1971	France	Bonaparte and the revolution	Bonaparte et la révolution	Abel Gance	Drama, History.
1971	France; Italy; Romania	The Married Couple of the Year Two	Les Mariés de l'an Deux	Jean-Paul Rappeneau	Action, Adventure, Comedy, Romance.
1973	Italy	La Tosca		Luigi Magni	Drama, Musical. Based on the play La Tosca. Battle of Marengo
1976	Italy; Spain	The Two Orphans	Le due orfanelle Las dos huerfanitas	Leopoldo Savona	Drama. Based on the play The Two Orphans.
1979	Japan; France	Lady Oscar	ベルサイユのばら	Jacques Demy	Drama, History, Romance. Based on the manga The Rose of Versailles.

== 1980s ==
Year	Country	Main title (Alternative title)	Original title (Original script)	Director	Subject
1981	United States	History of the World, Part I		Mel Brooks	Comedy, History, Musical.
1982	France; Italy	That Night in Varennes	Il mondo nuovo La Nuit de Varennes	Ettore Scola	Drama, History. Based on the novel La Nuit de Varennes ou l'Impossible n'est pas français. Flight to Varennes
1983	France; Poland; West Germany	Danton		Andrzej Wajda	Biography, Drama, History. Based on the play The Danton Case. Georges Danton
1984	Hungary	The Annunciation	Angyali üdvözlet	András Jeles	Drama. Based on the play The Tragedy of Man. Georges Danton
1985	East Germany	The Geese of Buetzow	Die Gänse von Bützow	Frank Vogel	Comedy. Based on a novel Die Gänse von Bützow.
1985	Egypt; France	Bonaparte in Egypt	وداعا بونابرت; Adieu Bonaparte	Youssef Chahine	Drama, History, War. French campaign in Egypt and Syria
1985	France; Italy; West Germany	Freedom, Equality, Sauerkraut	Liberté, Égalité, Choucroute	Jean Yanne	Comedy.
1986	Italy	Super ghosts	Superfantozzi	Neri Parenti	Comedy.
1987	Soviet Union	Destiny's Chosen One	Избранник судьбы	Vsevolod Shilovsky	Comedy, Music. Based on the play The Man of Destiny.
1988	East Germany	Treffen in Travers		Michael Gwisdek	Drama, History.
1988	French	Chouans!		Philippe de Broca	Adventure, History, War. Based on a novel Les Chouans. Chouannerie
1989	French; Italy; West Germany; Canada; United Kingdom	The French Revolution	La Révolution française	Robert Enrico; Richard T. Heffron	Drama, History, Thriller, War.
1989	France	The Austrian	L'Autrichienne	Pierre Granier-Deferre	Biography, Drama, History. Marie Antoinette
1989	France; Canada	Wait those lunatics	Vent de galerne	Bernard Favre	Drama, History, War. War in the Vendée
1989	Belgium; France	Marquis		Henri Xhonneux	Comedy. Marquis de Sade
1989	France		Tolérance	Pierre-Henri Salfati	Drama.

== 1990s ==
Year	Country	Main title (Alternative title)	Original title (Original script)	Director	Subject
1990	Italy; France	The Amusements of Private Life	I divertimenti della vita privata Les amusements de la vie privée	Cristina Comencini	Comedy.
1990	Japan	The Rose of Versailles: I'll Love You As Long As I Live	ベルサイユのばら 生命あるかぎり愛して	Kenji Kodama; Yoshio Takeuchi	Animation, Drama, History, Romance. Based on the manga The Rose of Versailles.
1995	France; United States	Jefferson in Paris		James Ivory	Biography, Drama, History, Romance.
1996	France	Ridicule		Patrice Leconte	Comedy, Drama, History, Romance.
1997	United States	Passion in the Desert		Lavinia Currier	Adventure, Drama. Based on the short story Une passion dans le désert. French campaign in Egypt and Syria
1999	Switzerland; France; Belgium	War in the Highlands	La Guerre dans le Haut Pays	Francis Reusser	Drama, Romance, War. Based on a novel La Guerre dans le Haut-Pays.

== 2000s ==
Year	Country	Main title (Alternative title)	Original title (Original script)	Director	Subject
2000	United Kingdom	Pandaemonium		Julien Temple	Biography, Drama. Samuel Taylor Coleridge, William Wordsworth
2000	France	Sade		Benoît Jacquot	Biography, Crime, Drama, History. Based on a novel La terreur dans le boudoir. Marquis de Sade
2001	France; Germany	The Lady and the Duke	L'Anglaise et le Duc	Éric Rohmer	Drama, History, Romance, War. Based on the memoirs Ma vie sous la révolution. Grace Elliott
2001	Italy; France; United Kingdom; Germany	Tosca		Benoît Jacquot	Drama, Music, Musical. Based on the play La Tosca. Battle of Marengo
2004	Italy	The Remains of Nothing	Il resto di niente	Antonietta De Lillo	Drama, History. Based on a novel Il resto di niente. Eleonora Fonseca Pimentel, Parthenopean Republic
2006	United States; United Kingdom	Amazing Grace		Michael Apted	Biography, Drama, History. William Wilberforce
2006	France; United States; Japan	Marie Antoinette		Sofia Coppola	Biography, Drama, History, Romance. Marie Antoinette
2006	United States; Spain	Goya's Ghosts		Miloš Forman	Biography, Drama, History.

== 2010s ==
Year	Country	Main title (Alternative title)	Original title (Original script)	Director	Subject
2012	France; Spain	Farewell, My Queen	Les Adieux à la reine	Benoît Jacquot	Drama, History, Romance. Marie Antoinette
2015	France; Georgia	Winter song	Chant d'hiver	Otar Iosseliani	Comedy, Drama.
2018	Portugal; France	The Black Book	O caderno negro	Valeria Sarmiento	Drama, History, Romance.
2018	France; Belgium	One Nation, One King	Un peuple et son roi	Pierre Schoeller	Drama, History.
2018	France	A strong desire for happiness	Un violent désir de bonheur	Clément Schneider	Drama.

== 2020s ==
Year	Country	Main title (Alternative title)	Original title (Original script)	Director	Subject
2022	United States	Chevalier		Stephen Williams	Biography, Drama, History, Music. Chevalier de Saint-Georges
2023	France	Win or die	Vaincre ou mourir	Paul Mignot; Vincent Mottez	Action, History, War. War in the Vendée, François de Charette
2023	United States; United Kingdom	Napoleon		Ridley Scott	Action, Biography, Drama, History, War.
2024	Italy; France	The Flood	Le Déluge	Gianluca Jodice	Drama, History. Louis XVI, Marie Antoinette, Louis XVII, Marie-Thérèse.
2025	Japan	The Rose of Versailles	ベルサイユのばら	Ai Yoshimura	Animation, Drama, History, Romance. Based on the manga The Rose of Versailles.

== Science fiction, fantasy and horror ==
Year	Country	Main title (Alternative title)	Original title (Original script)	Director	Subject
1952	France; Italy	Beauties of the Night	Les Belles de nuit	René Clair	Comedy, Fantasy, Music, Romance.
1957	United States	The Story of Mankind		Irwin Allen	Drama, Fantasy, Sci-Fi. Based on the book The Story of Mankind. Marie Antoinette, Napoleon
1981	United Kingdom	Time Bandits		Terry Gilliam	Adventure, Comedy, Fantasy, Sci-Fi. Battle of Castiglione, Napoleon
1994	United Kingdom; Canada; France	Highlander III: The Sorcerer		Andy Morahan	Action, Fantasy, Romance, Sci-Fi.
2001	France; Belgium; Venezuela	Brotherhood of the Wolf	Le Pacte des loups	Christophe Gans	Action, Adventure, Drama, Horror, Thriller.
2011	Hungary	The Tragedy of Man	Az ember tragédiája	Marcell Jankovics	Animation, Drama, History, Sci-Fi. Based on the play The Tragedy of Man.
2016	France; Belgium; Czech Republic	The Visitors: Bastille Day	Les Visiteurs: La Révolution	Jean-Marie Poiré	Adventure, Comedy, Fantasy.
2023	Chile	The Count	El Conde	Pablo Larraín	Comedy, Fantasy, History, Horror.

== Television films ==
Year	Country	Main title (Alternative title)	Original title (Original script)	Director	Subject
1959	France	Wolves	Les Loups	Marcel Bluwal	Based on the play Les Loups. Siege of Mainz (1793)
1959	Yugoslavia	A man of destiny	Човек судбине Čovek sudbine	Mirjana Samardžić	Drama. Based on the play The Man of Destiny.
1961	France	The Two Orphans	Les deux orphelines	Jean-Marie Coldefy	Based on the play The Two Orphans.
1963	West Germany	The Wolves	Die Wölfe	Falk Harnack	Based on the play Les Loups. Siege of Mainz (1793)
1963	West Germany	Danton's death	Dantons Tod	Fritz Umgelter	Drama. Based on the play Danton's Death. Georges Danton
1967	Finland	Jean-Paul Marat persecuted and murdered as represented by the patients of the Charenton Hospital under the direction of M. de Sade	Jean-Paul Marat förföljd och mördad så som det framställs av patienterna på hospitalet Charenton under ledning av herr de Sade	Tom Segerberg	Drama. Based on the play Marat/Sade. Marquis de Sade, Jean-Paul Marat, Charlotte Corday
1967	France	Valmy		Jean Chérasse; Abel Gance	Battle of Valmy
1970	France	Danton's death	La mort de Danton	Claude Barma	Based on the play Danton's Death. Georges Danton
1973	United States	The Man of Destiny		Joseph Hardy	Comedy. Based on the play The Man of Destiny.
1975	France	Saint-Just and the Force of Things	Saint-Just et la Force des choses	Pierre Cardinal	Biography, Drama, History. Based on a novel Saint-Just et la Force des choses. Louis Antoine de Saint-Just
1976	Italy; West Germany		Tosca	Gianfranco De Bosio	Crime, Drama, Musical, Romance, Thriller. Based on the play La Tosca. Battle of Marengo
1978	Hungary	The Danton Affair	A Danton-ügy	Gergely Horváth	Drama.
1978	France	When the bocage was blazing	Quand flambait le bocage	Claude-Jean Bonnardot	Based on the novel Quand flambait le bocage. War in the Vendée
1980	United States	A Tale of Two Cities		Jim Goddard	Drama, History, Romance, War. Based on a novel A Tale of Two Cities.
1981	United Kingdom	The Man of Destiny		Desmond Davis	Drama. Based on the play The Man of Destiny.
1981	West Germany	Danton's death	Dantons Tod	Rudolf Noelte	Drama.
1981	France	The Two Orphans	Les deux orphelines	Gérard Thomas	Drama. Based on the play The Two Orphans.
1982	United Kingdom	The Scarlet Pimpernel		Clive Donner	Action, Drama, Romance. Based on a novels The Scarlet Pimpernel, Eldorado.
1989	Belgium; Canada; France		Manon Roland	Édouard Molinaro	Biography, History. Madame Roland
1990	Czechoslovakia		Vlci	Pavel Háša	Drama, History, War. Based on the play Les Loups. Siege of Mainz (1793)
2004	Italy; France	Luisa Sanfelice		Paolo and Vittorio Taviani	Drama, History, Romance. Based on a novel La Sanfelice. Luisa Sanfelice
2006	Canada; France		Marie-Antoinette	Francis Leclerc; Yves Simoneau	Biography, Drama, History. Marie Antoinette
2008	France		Charlotte Corday	Henri Helman	Biography, Crime, Drama, History, Thriller. Charlotte Corday
2010	France	Chateaubriand		Pierre Aknine	Biography. François-René de Chateaubriand
2011	France	Louis XVI, the man who did not want to be king	Louis XVI, l'homme qui ne voulait pas être roi	Thierry Binisti	History. Louis XVI
2014	France	The King's General	Le Général du roi	Nina Companeez	Drama. War in the Vendée
2025	France	Olympe, a woman in the Revolution	Olympe, une femme dans la Révolution	Julie Gayet; Mathieu Busson	Biography. Olympe de Gouges

== Television series ==
Year	Country	Main title (Alternative title)	Original title (Original script)	Director	Subject
1953	United States	A Tale of Two Cities		Dick Darley	Drama. Based on a novel A Tale of Two Cities.
1955-56	United Kingdom	The Adventures of the Scarlet Pimpernel		David MacDonald; Dennis Vance; Michael McCarthy; Wolf Rilla	Adventure, Family. Based on a novel The Scarlet Pimpernel.
1957	United Kingdom	A Tale of Two Cities			Drama, History, Romance, War. Based on a novel A Tale of Two Cities.
1957-66	France	The camera explores time	La caméra explore le temps	Stellio Lorenzi; André Castelot; Alain Decaux; Michelle O'Glor	History.
1957-61	United States	DuPont Show of the Month		Sidney Lumet; Ralph Nelson; Alex Segal; Robert Mulligan	Comedy, Drama, History, Romance.
1962	Italy	The Jacobins	I Giacobini	Edmo Fenoglio	Based on the play I Giacobini.
1963	France; Italy	The Knight of Maison Rouge	Le Chevalier de Maison-Rouge	Claude Barma	History, Romance. Based on a novel Le Chevalier de Maison-Rouge.
1964	Italy	The great chameleons	I grandi camaleonti	Edmo Fenoglio	Drama.
1965	United Kingdom	A Tale of Two Cities		Joan Craft	Drama. Based on a novel A Tale of Two Cities.
1966	Italy		Luisa Sanfelice	Leonardo Cortese	Drama. Based on a novel La Sanfelice. Luisa Sanfelice
1968	Norway	The red pimpernel	Den røde pimpernell	Rolf Clemens	Adventure, Drama. Based on a novel The Scarlet Pimpernel.
1969	United Kingdom	The Elusive Pimpernel		Gerald Blake	Adventure. Based on a novel The Scarlet Pimpernel.
1971	France	The Traveler of the Ages	Le Voyageur des siècles	Jean Dréville	Mystery, Sci-Fi.
1975	France	Maria Antonina	Marie-Antoinette	Guy Lefranc	Biography, Drama, History.
1975	Japan	The Star of the Seine	ラ・セーヌの星	Masaaki Ōsumi; Yoshiyuki Tomino	Animation, Adventure, Drama, History.
1978	France	Love under the Revolution	Les Amours sous la Révolution	Jean-Paul Carrère	
1978	France		1788	Maurice Failevic	
1979-80	Japan	Lady Oscar: The Rose of Versailles	ベルサイユのばら		Animation, Action, Drama, History, Romance. Based on the manga The Rose of Versailles.
1979-80	France	Josephine or the comedy of ambitions	Joséphine ou la Comédie des ambitions	Robert Mazoyer	Biography, Drama, History.
1980	United Kingdom	A Tale of Two Cities		Michael E. Briant	Drama. Based on a novel A Tale of Two Cities.
1981	France; West Germany	White, blue, red	Blanc, bleu, rouge	Étienne Laroche	Drama, History. Based on a roman Sophie.
1983	France		Marianne	Juliette Benzoni; Marion Sarraut	Drama, History. Based on a roman Marianne.
1987	United States	Napoleon and Josephine: A Love Story		Richard T. Heffron	History, Romance, War.
1989	France	Children of Liberty	Les Enfants de la liberté	Patrick Schwerdtle	Animation, Adventure, Family, History.
1989	France	My last dream will be for you	Mon dernier rêve sera pour vous	Robert Mazoyer	Biography, Drama. François-René de Chateaubriand
1989	France	The Countess of Charny	La Comtesse de Charny	Marion Sarraut	Drama, History. Based on a Alexandre Dumas novels.
1989	France; Italy; West Germany	The Grand Cabriole	La Grande Cabriole	Nina Companeez	Biography, Drama, History.
1989	United Kingdom; France	A Tale of Two Cities		Philippe Monnier	Drama, History, Romance, War. Based on a novel A Tale of Two Cities.
1989	France	The petticoats of the revolution	Les jupons de la révolution	Maroun Bagdadi; Miguel Courtois; Vincent De Brus; Claude Faraldo; Didier Grousset; Caroline Huppert	History.
1991	Belgium; France; Canada; Poland	Napoleon	Napoléon et l'Europe	José Fonseca e Costa; Eberhard Itzenplitz; Pierre Lary; Janusz Majewski; Francis Megahy; Krzysztof Zanussi	Drama, History.
1995	Czech Republic	Man in the background	Muž v pozadí	Pavel Háša	Drama. Joseph Fouché
1998-2003	United Kingdom	Hornblower		Andrew Grieve	Adventure, Drama, War. Based on a C. S. Forester novels.
1999	United Kingdom	Let Them Eat Cake		Peter Learmouth	Comedy, History.
1999-2000	United Kingdom	The Scarlet Pimpernel		Patrick Lau; Simon Langton; Edward Bennett; Graham Theakston	Adventure, Drama. Based on a novel The Scarlet Pimpernel.
2002	France; Germany; Italy; Canada; United States; United Kingdom; Hungary; Spain; Czech Republic	Napoléon		Yves Simoneau	Adventure, Biography, Drama, History, Romance, War
2012	Egypt	Napoleon and the guarded	نابليون والمحروسة; Napoléon wal Mahroussa	Chawki Mejri	History. French campaign in Egypt and Syria
2013	France	A Woman in the Revolution	Une femme dans la Révolution	Jean-Daniel Verhaeghe	History.
2023-2025	United States	Castlevania: Nocturne		Sam Deats; Adam Deats	Animation, Action, Adventure, Fantasy, Horror, Thriller.
2026	United Kingdom; France	A Tale of Two Cities		Hong Khaou; Richard Clark	Drama, History, Mystery, Romance, Thriller. Based on a novel A Tale of Two Cities.
