= Luisa Sanfelice (disambiguation) =

Luisa Sanfelice (1764-1800) was an Italian aristocrat.

Luisa Sanfelice may also refer to:

- Luisa Sanfelice in Carcere, a painting by the Italian artist Gioacchino Toma
- Luisa Sanfelice (1942 film), an Italian film directed by Leo Menardi
- Luisa Sanfelice (2004 film), an Italian film directed by Paolo and Vittorio Taviani

== See also ==
- La Sanfelice, an 1864 novel by the French writer Alexandre Dumas
