= Vincenzo Russo (revolutionary) =

Italian revolutionary (1770–1799)

Personal details
- Born: 16 June 1770 Palma Campania, Italy
- Died: 19 November 1799 (aged 29) Naples, Italy

Vincenzo Russo (16 June 1770 – 19 November 1799) was an Italian revolutionary, who was a leading supporter of the short-lived Parthenopean Republic. Captured by the Sanfedista forces, he was soon executed along with many other rebels of the Bourbon rule of Ferdinand IV of Naples.

== Biography ==
He obtained degrees in medicine from Nola and in law from Naples universities. Agreeing with the Jacobin principles of Robespierre, he joined two secret societies - the Club Rivoluzionario and the Società Patrottica - where he advocated the use of revolutionary, armed struggle against the Bourbon state in favor of the weakest in society. He was exiled for holding such "proto-communist" ideas.

Inspired by the French Revolution, Russo fled to Milan, then Switzerland, and then to Rome where he supported the French-supported Roman Republic of 1798–9. During this period he took an active part in the cultural life of the republic, helping organise heated discussions in the democratic clubs and writing for the newly founded press.

He was among those who pressed the French into declaring Campania a republic. In the newly proclaimed Neapolitan Republic (also known as the Parthenopean Republic) he contributed to the "Monitore Napolitano", the journal edited by Eleonora Fonseca Pimentel, and went down to speak among the people.

However, the republic was short-lived: Cardinal Fabrizio Ruffo soon counter-attacked with his army of Sanfedisti, fighting on the side of the Bourbon king (aided in this mainly by the British), and supported by an uprising of the royalist rabble, the Naples Lazzaroni. With weapons in hand, Russo was taken prisoner on 13 June 1799. He became a martyr to the cause of Italian Jacobinism at the age of 29 when he was hanged in Piazza del Mercato, Naples, on 19 November 1799. He was buried, according to one source, on the seashore near the Ponte della Maddalena, Naples, for refusing to utter the required words just prior to execution. A later source gives his last resting place as the Church of San Matteo al Lavinaio, Naples.

== Political thought ==
In his most important work, "Pensieri politici", published in Rome in 1798, Russo puts forward a socio-political theory of a peasant state, founded on justice and barbarism, where the degree of egalitarianism was to exceed even that of Louis Saint-Just. An individual's freedom from want would be based on the tenancy of a piece of land belonging to the community, and not on hereditary property.

Russo establishes a legitimate property limit at just the amount needed to satisfy a person's basic needs; such a limit would be "calculated" from a combination of the needs of each individual and the amount required to secure his or her economic freedom and equality to other members of the community. So, for Russo, economic equality is the essential precondition for genuine political equality. But such equality would only be possible in small communities, such as the Ancient Greek polis, as had been suggested by Plato and Jean Jacques Rousseau. For both these thinkers, the city should be limited in size in order to guarantee the effective participation of all citizens in the political process. A public system of general education would be necessary in order for everyone to take part in the running of the community in an informed way.

Given the close link between landed property and political awareness in Russo's ideal state, it could be likened to a "republic of peasant-philosophers". He therefore rejects industrial development and commerce on the basis that they would create, respectively, unhealthy living conditions for workers, and a craving for ever more wealth to the detriment of an honest and simple life. Sections 23-5 of his "Pensieri politici" contain the fundamentals of his thought on the questions of commerce, agriculture and the city.

== Bibliography ==
- Constance Giglioli, Naples in 1799, London, Murray, 1903
- Benedetto Croce, La rivoluzione napoletana del 1799. Biografie, racconti e ricerche, Bari, Laterza, 1912, 1961
- Benedetto Croce, Anedotti di varia letteratura, 2nd ed., Bari, Laterza, 1953
- Delio Cantimori (ed.), Giacobini italiani, vol. I, Bari, Laterza, 1956
- Anthony Pagden, Francesco Mario Pagano's 'Republic of Virtue', in The Invention of the Modern Republic, Biancamaria Fontana (ed.), Cambridge, CUP, 1994
- Cristina Passetti, Il giacobinismo radicale di Vincenzo Russo: gli elementi non utopici del suo pensiero politico, Naples, La Città del Sole, 1999
- Luigi Sorrentino, Io muoio libero e per la repubblica. Vita ed opere di Vincenzo Russo ideologo e martire del 1799, Naples, Istituto Grafico Editoriale Italiano – Gruppo Archeologico Terra di Palma, 1999
- Enzo Rega – Pasquale Gerardo Santella (eds.), Vincenzo Russo e la Rivoluzione napoletana del 1799. Atti del Convegno (22 gennaio – 19 novembre 1999), Comune di Palma Campania, Naples, 2000
- Nico Perrone, La Loggia della Philantropia. Un religioso danese a Napoli prima della rivoluzione. Con la corrispondenza massonica e altri documenti, Palermo, Sellerio, 2000
- Enzo Rega, Nell'urgenza della storia gli interventi "giornalistici" di Vincenzo Russo, in Il Contributo, No.1-2, Roma, Edizioni Nuova Cultura, 2010
- Enzo Rega, La coscienza dell'utopia. Vincenzo Russo, giacobino napoletano, Nola (Naples), L'arca e l'arco edizioni, 2011
