= Vincenzo Russo =

Vincenzo Russo may refer to:

- Vincenzo Russo (revolutionary) (1770–1799), Italian revolutionary supportive of the Parthenopean Republic
- Vincenzo Russo (politician, born 1901), Italian lawyer and politician who served on the Chamber of Deputies from 1963 to 1968
- Vincenzo Russo (politician, born 1924), Italian politician who was a member of the Chamber of Deputies from 1958 to 1992, then served on the Senate until 1994

== See also ==
- Vincent Russo (disambiguation)
