= Pour Vous =

French film magazine (1928–1940)

- Editor-in-chief: Nino Frank
- Former editors: Alexandre Arnoux
- Categories: Film magazine
- Frequency: Weekly
- Founder: Léon Bailby
- Founded: 1928
- First issue: 22 November 1928
- Final issue: 1940
- Country: France
- Based in: Paris
- Language: French

Pour Vous was a weekly film magazine which existed between 1928 and 1940 in Paris, France. During its lifetime it was one of the most read film magazines in the country.

== History and profile ==
Pour Vous was started by Léon Bailby in 1928, and its first issue appeared on 22 November that year. The magazine was a sister publication to the conservative daily newspaper L'Intransigeant. Its headquarters was in Paris. It was published on a weekly basis in the tabloid format and was the largest of all film magazines in France having a size of 55x31 cm. The magazine consisted of sixteen pages.

Its editor was Alexandre Arnoux. In the first issue Nino Frank published his first article on movies and worked in the magazine as the editor-in-chief until its demise in 1940. Unlike other movie magazines of the period it published full list of the films played in Paris. It frequently covered news about the Hollywood stars and also, published photographs by avant-garde artists, including Lee Miller and Man Ray. Arnoux creatively mixed the photographs and textual materials to reflect the contrasts between the French and American movie traditions. Colin Crisp was among the contributors of Pour Vous in 1932 and 1933. The magazine also published interviews with leading figures, such as Arletty.

Pour Vous folded in 1940 after producing 603 issues due to the occupation of France by the Nazi Germany.
