= Il conte Aquila =

- Directed by: Guido Salvini
- Written by: Guido Salvini; Giuseppe Di Martino
- Story by: Rino Alessi
- Cinematography: Anchise Brizzi
- Music by: Bruno Nicolai
- Release date: 1955
- Country: Italy
- Language: Italian

Il conte Aquila ("Count Aquila") is a 1955 Italian historical drama film directed by Guido Salvini. Inspired by real life events of Italian revolutionary Count Federico Confalonieri, it is based on the drama with the same name by Rino Alessi.

== Cast ==
- Rossano Brazzi as Count Federico Confalonieri
- Valentina Cortese as Teresa Casati
- Paolo Stoppa as Prince Klemens von Metternich
- Leonardo Cortese as Gabrio Casati
- Mario Ferrari as Vitaliano Confalonieri
- Elena Zareschi as Austrian Empress
- Tino Buazzelli as Judge Menghin
- Linda Sini as Marquise Bice
- Carlo Tamberlani
- Renato De Carmine
- Tullio Altamura
