= Jean-Baptiste Michonis =

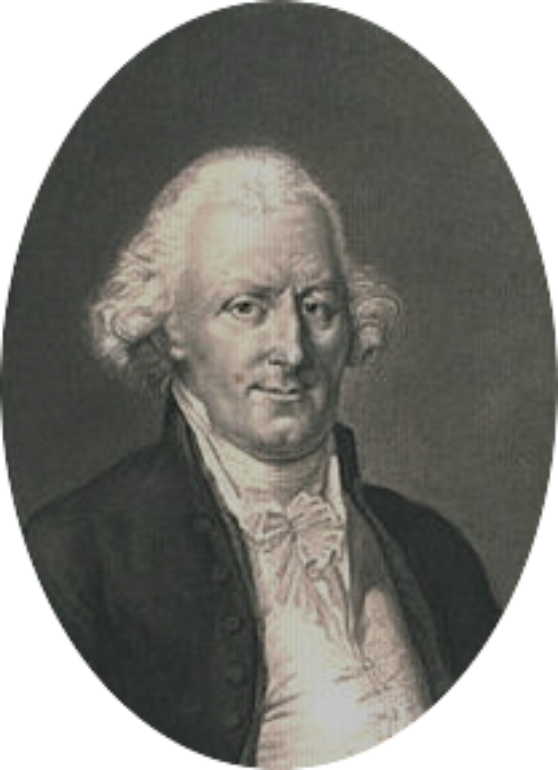
Jean-Baptiste Michonis

Jean-Baptiste Michonis (1735 – 17 June 1794) was a personality of the French Revolution. Originally a producer of lemonade, he became a member of the Commune de Paris, inspector of prisons and chief of police. He participated in the "complot de l'œillet", a failed attempt to rescue Marie-Antoinette organised by Jean, Baron de Batz, and for this was guillotined in what is now the Place de la Nation. He was buried in the cimetière de Picpus.
