= Le Chevalier de Maison-Rouge =

1845 novel by Alexandre Dumas

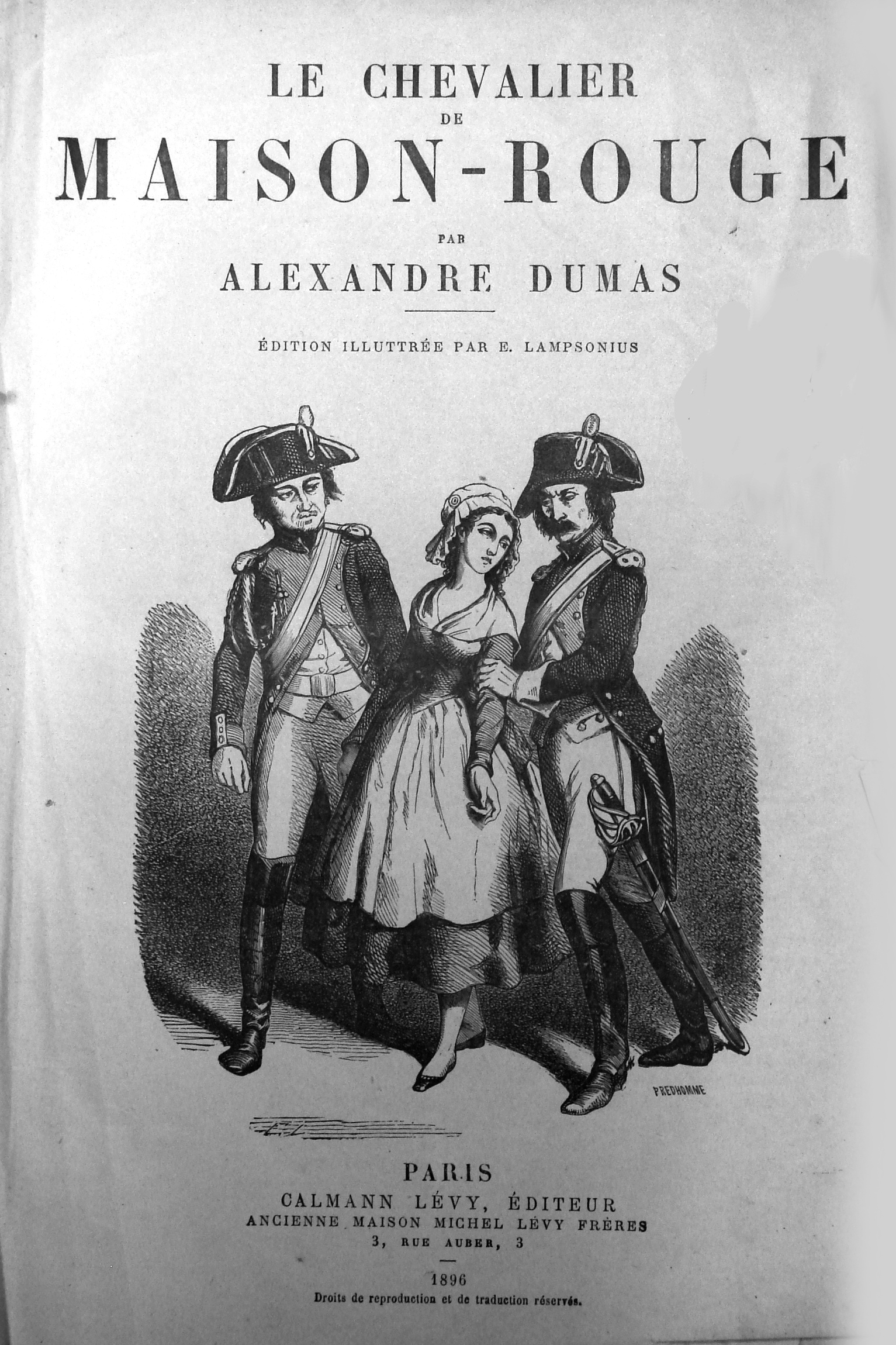
- Author: Alexandre Dumas
- Language: French
- Genre: Historical
- Publication date: 1845-1846
- Publication place: France
- Pages: 558 p. (Editions Complexe, 2002)
- ISBN: 978-2-87027-950-2

Le Chevalier de Maison-Rouge is a historical novel, written in 1845 by Alexandre Dumas, père.

The novel was translated into English in 1893 under the title The Knight of Redcastle. It has also been translated as The Knight of Maison-Rouge: A Novel of Marie Antoinette.

The novel is related to a series referred to as the Marie Antoinette romances, though technically not part of that series as the characters of Joseph Balsamo (also known as Cagliostro) and Doctor Gilbert do not appear in the novel, and many of the other series' protagonists have died by the start of this novel. The novel takes place shortly after the end of the series, following the death of Louis XVI. Set in Paris during the Reign of Terror, the novel follows the adventures of a brave young man named Maurice Lindey who unwittingly implicates himself in a Royalist plot to rescue Marie Antoinette from prison. Maurice is devoted to the Republican cause, but his infatuation with a beautiful young woman leads him into the service of the mysterious Knight of Maison-Rouge, the mastermind behind the plot.

Alexandre Dumas based events in the novel on the "Carnation Plot", an attempt by the Marquis Alexandre Gonsse de Rougeville to communicate with Marie Antoinette by hiding a secret message in the petals of a carnation. According to the biography La vie d'Alexandre Dumas père by J. Lucas-Dubreton, Dumas had originally titled the work Le Chevalier de Rougeville, but changed the title to Le Chevalier de Maison-Rouge after receiving a complaint from the son of the Marquis de Rougeville.

== Adaptations ==

Dumas adapted his novel for the stage.

In 1914 century the novel was adapted for the screen by Alberto Capellani, and in 1963 for television.

== Bibliography ==
- English translation of La vie d'Alexandre Dumas père by J. Lucas-Dubreton
