= Carnation Plot =

Plot to free Royal family during French Revolution

The Carnation Plot, was one of the many plots that failed to free the royal family of France from the Revolution. Also known as the "le complot de l'oeillet", it was a plan to free Marie Antoinette, former Queen of France, in August 1793. Conspired by Alexandre Gonsse de Rougeville, who was loyal to Louis XVI and was with Louis XVI when a crowd entered the Tuileries Palace, and was also present at the insurrection at the Tuileries Palace (10th of August). However, it did not succeed.

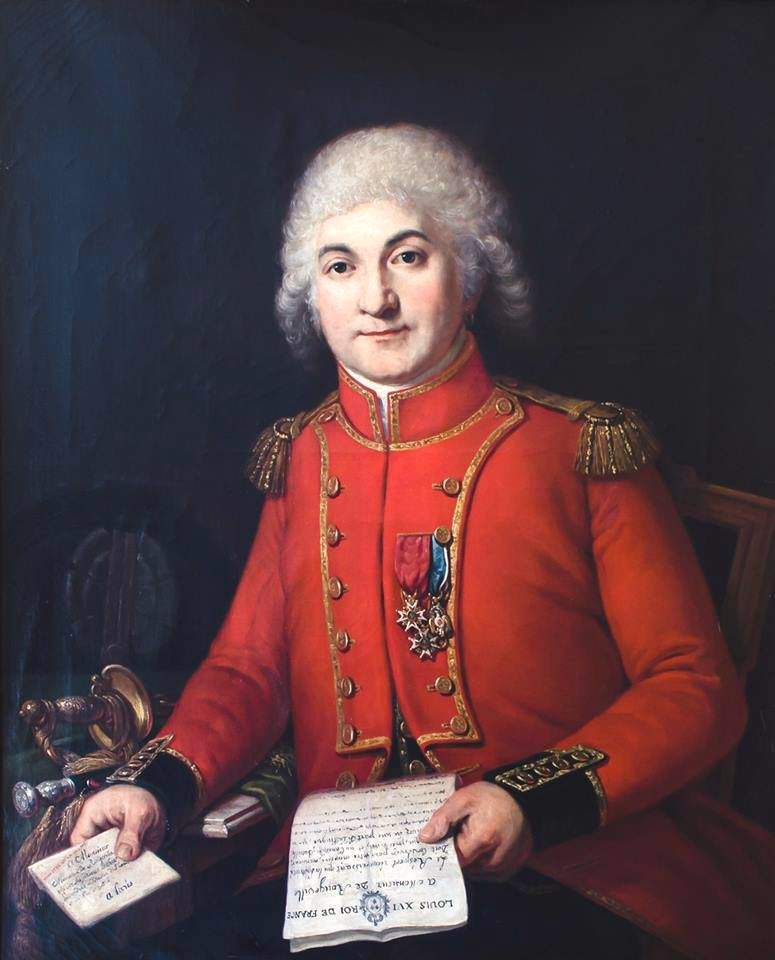
A painting of Alexandre Gonsse de Rougeville

After the event at the Tuileries Palace, Rougeville met the family's jail administrator, Jean-Baptiste Michonis. Michonis was originally a revolutionary, but supposedly after he talked and spoke to Rougeville, he too wanted to free the Queen. They both agreed that Rougeville along with Michonis would go to Conciergerie, where the Queen is located. Rougeville wrote that;

"The room was small, damp, and ill-smelling...there were three beds: one for the Queen, the other, by the side of hers, for the woman who served her; the third, for the two gendarmes, who never left the room on any occasion or under any circumstances whatsoever."

Rougeville also wrote that when he visited the Queen at Conciergerie, she was thin, weak and could barely walk. Before visiting the Queen, Rougeville had pinned two carnations onto his lapel, which resulted in the scheme being called the Carnation Plot. This was part of his plan, for he gave Marie one carnation, which had a note inside. Subsequent events are unclear, but there are many theories. One theory suggests that a gendarmes spotted the note and read the note. Another, which is probably the least likely suggested that a warden's wife Madame Richard noticed the note, and when picking it up, Rougeville rushed to Madame Richard and ate the note. The third and most plausible theory is that Marie Antoinette noticed the note after Rougeville and Michonis left, and read the note without anyone noticing. After reading the note, Marie Antoinette contacted Rougeville. They spoke privately, while Michonis was talking and occupying the gendarmes. However, later Michonis was fearing that the gendarmes would start to suspect Michonis, so he contacted Rougeville and they left. However, Rougeville supposedly left money for the Queen for bribes, and also left another note informing the Queen that Rougeville will come back on Friday. Afterwards, it is claimed that the Queen used a pin to pierce a message, which read;

"I am watched; I neither talk nor write; I trust in you; I shall come"

Marie Antoinette gave the note to a gendarme, Jean Gilbert. Instead of giving the note to Rougeville, Jean Gilbert gave the note to Madame Richard, who gave it to Michonis. Rougeville arrived on Friday as promised, and gave the Queen some money, which was used to bribe Toussaint Richard (the warden) and Madame Richard. The Queen's escape date was set to be on 2 September and 3 September.

The plan was to release Marie using Michonis, then Rougeville would receive Marie, and would receive Madame Jarjayes in Livry-Gargan, and then the Queen would be taken to Germany. To make sure the gendarmes would not tell anyone of the plot, they were given 50 Louis d'or. However, the plot was ruined when a guard stopped the Queen from leaving and, "declared that if they carried the Queen away, he would call the guard." The plotters could not change the guard's mind, so thus the plan failed.

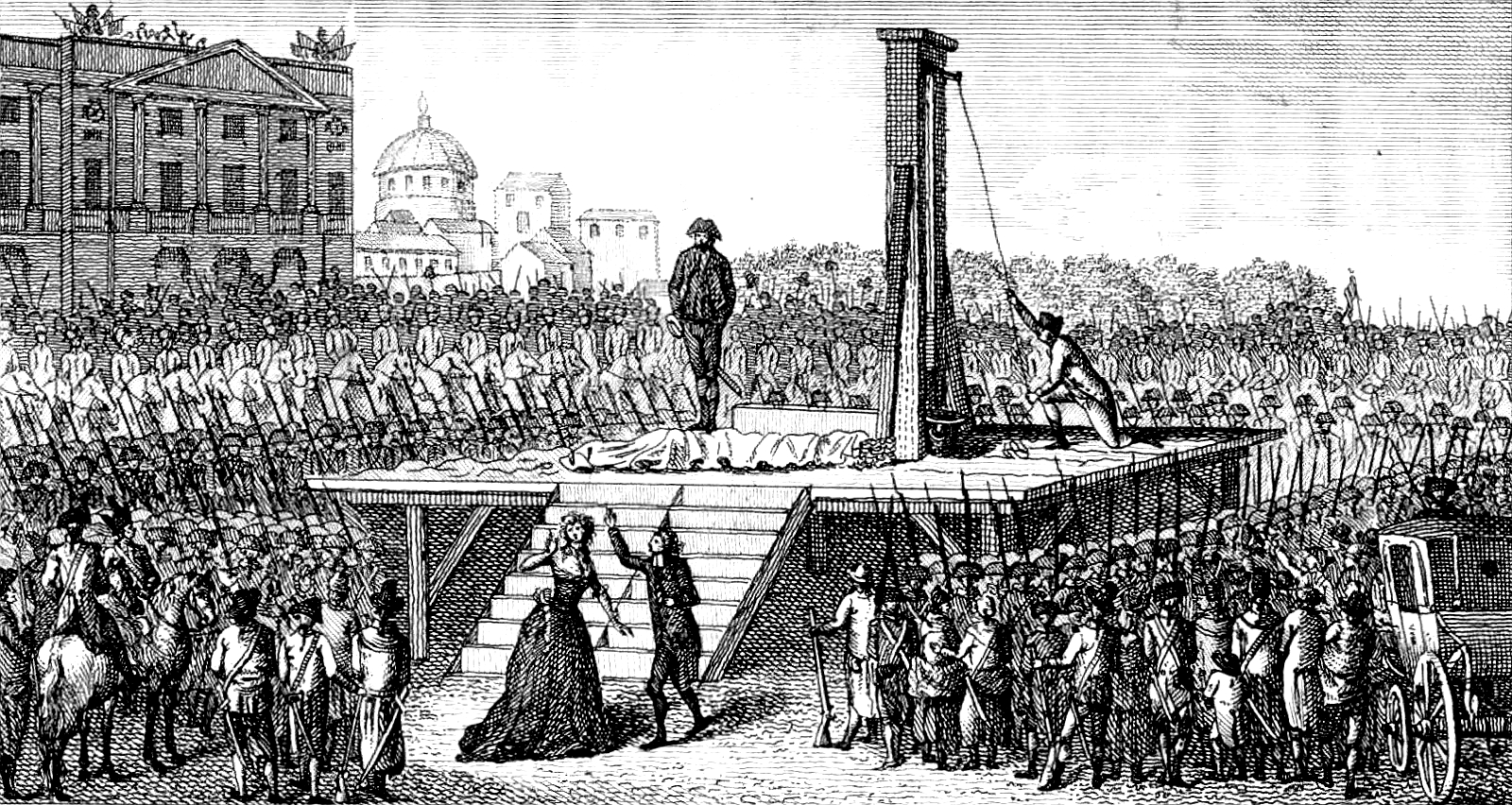
The execution of Marie Antoinette on 16 October 1793

Later, on 3 September, Jean Gilbert announced the planned escape. The public was amazed, and the Convention took drastic measures. Rougeville moved to Reims, and died there in 1814. The other members, Michonis, Toussaint Richard, and Madame Richard were all arrested. Marie Antoinette never told the examiners anything, but they increased surveillance and the Queen was executed on 16 October 1793.

Michonis was later found guilty and was executed on 17 July 1794. Toussaint Richard and Madame Richard were released after the Queen's death. Madame Richard returned to work and was later murdered.

The story of the plot attracted the attention of the novelist Dumas who used it in his Le Chevalier de Maison-Rouge.
