= La Sanfelice =

1864 novel by Alexandre Dumas

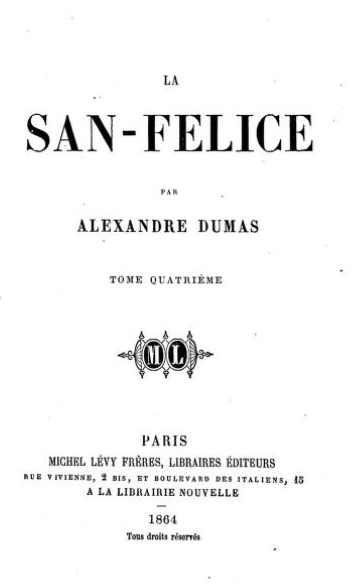
- Title page for La San-Felice (1864)
- Author: Alexandre Dumas
- Language: French
- Genre: Historical novel
- Publication date: 1864
- Media type: Print

La Sanfelice (or La San Felice) is an 1864 novel by the French writer Alexandre Dumas. It depicts the arrest and execution in Naples of Luisa Sanfelice, who was accused of conspiring with the French and their supporters against Ferdinand I of the Two Sicilies during the French Revolutionary War. Lord Nelson and Lady Hamilton, who were in Naples at the time, also feature as characters.

== Film adaptations ==
In 1942 the novel was used as the basis for the historical film Luisa Sanfelice directed by Leo Menardi. The 1968 film Emma Hamilton directed by Christian-Jaque was also loosely based on the novel. Paolo and Vittorio Taviani made a television film Luisa Sanfelice in 2004.

== Bibliography ==
- Maxwell, Richard. The Historical Novel in Europe, 1650-1950. Cambridge University Press, 2012.
