= Ponte della Maddalena, Naples =

Coordinates: 40.84529°N 14.27793°E

The Ponte della Maddalena was a bridge on the south east of Naples, Italy, spanning over what was once the River Sebeto, and now reflected by the path of the Via Marinella. For centuries it was one of the entry points into Naples from the South, but was obliterated during the late 19th-century urban renewal of the city.

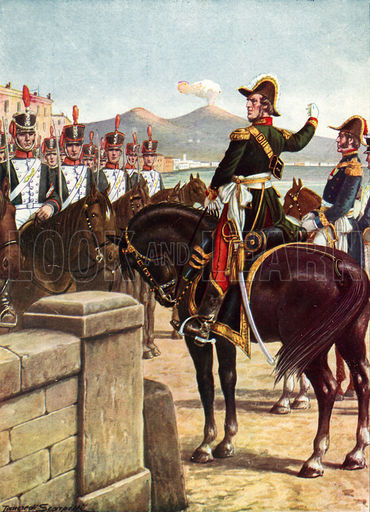
Guglielmo Pepe on the Ponte della Maddalena

Prior to Norman times, the bridge was known as pons padulis. Then it was named Guizzardo bridge, for a bridge built by Robert Guiscard, Duke of Puglia, when he lay siege to the city in 1078. It stood near the shoreline to the east of the city where the Via Marinella crossed the River Sebeto (within the present-day Vittorio Emanuele III docks and Piazza Mercato). The bridge was rebuilt in 1555 under the Viceroy Don Bernardino di Mendoza, to span the marsh ground where the Sebeto river arose during the rainy season. The bridge was rebuilt again in 1747 under Charles III and once again in the second half of the 19th century.

No longer in existence, it was an established and popular vantage point for topographical artists. Today, the Via Ponte della Maddalena in southeast Naples marks the spot of the original bridge.

The bridge was an excellent point at which to deny entry to invading forces into the city. The most famous of these was the stand in 1799 of the forces of the short-lived Neapolitan republic against the returning royalist Bourbon army.

The Miracle of the Magdalene bridge recalls an incident in December 1631, when the cardinal of Naples, led a procession dedicated to San Gennaro to the bridge to plead for the end to an eruption of Vesuvius. The ebbing of the eruption was interpreted as a miraculous intercession. A shrine was erected in 1777 with San Gennaro with his arms pacifying the volcano.
