= Vanina Vanini =

- Short story by Stendhal
- Poster from the 1961 film version
- Language: French

Publication
- Series: Chroniques italiennes (Italian Chronicles)

Vanina Vanini is a short story published in 1829 by Stendhal (1783–1842), the pen name of Marie-Henri Beyle. Set in the 1820s during the early Risorgimento, when Italy was under Austrian control, it concerns the love affair of a young Roman princess and a revolutionary carbonaro.

== Synopsis ==
Vanina Vanini, the nineteen-year-old daughter of a Roman aristocrat, Don Asdrubale Vanini, is sought after by all the young princes of Rome, but refuses them all, for of "the same [reason] that led Sulla to abdicate: her contempt for the Romans." When she notices that her usually carefree father is taking pains to lock up one room in his palace, and that a window in that room that is normally closed is open, she begins to investigate.

Vanina finds another window that lets out on the same terrace, and looks through into the mysterious room. There, she sees a wounded woman lying in bed, as well as bloodstained woman's clothing that seems to have been pierced many times with a knife. She observes her father come up to the room and speak to the woman, though she cannot hear what the two are saying. Vanina is fascinated by the mysterious woman, and when, one evening, the woman sees Vanina spying, Vanina falls to her knees and tells the woman that she loves her and is devoted to her.

The woman, who gives her name as Clementina, asks Vanina to visit her every day, but to keep the visits a secret from her father. Vanina wonders why the woman is hurt and must stay hidden; perhaps she has rejected a powerful man, or killed her lover. Clementina does not want the assistance of a surgeon, because surgeons are required to report wounds that they treat to the police, but Vanina offers to bring her a surgeon loyal to the family.

The woman then reveals that she is in fact a man, Pietro Missirilli, a carbonaro and the nineteen-year-old son of a surgeon from Sant'Angelo in Vado. Missirilli's group had been ambushed and he taken in chains to Rome, but after thirteen months, he was helped to escape in disguise as a woman. However, as he left the prison, in a moment of folly he struck and killed a guard who cursed the carbonari, and was pursued through Rome and wounded. Finding himself in the garden of Countess Vitelleschi, Don Asdrubale's mistress, he was spirited away in the latter's carriage. Don Asdrubale has thus saved his life, but he is dying of his wound.

That night, a surgeon arrives alone: Vanina's pride has been wounded by Missirilli's confession, and she does not want to see him. She is conflicted, struggling between love and pride, but eventually returns and confesses her love; soon after there is "nothing left that she could withhold from him."

Four months later, Missirilli is recovered, and Vanina thinks that he will be happy to remain with her, but he wants to take revenge and liberate Italy. Several times he plans to leave, but she persuades him to stay; she offers to marry him, but he refuses her in the interest of Italian liberation, and his nobility makes her love him more.

Missirilli goes to Forlì in Romagna, where he is made the leader of a band of carbonari. Vanina joins him there, giving a great deal of money and arms to his band; he is entirely occupied by his plans and his patriotism. She utterly fails to get him to show her love, but is too proud to leave him, so, via a former serving-maid, she denounces every member of Missirilli's band of carbonari, save Missirilli himself, to the authorities, hoping that this will end his plans and reunite him with her.

Instead, Missirilli turns himself in — he does not want his compatriots to think, because he was the only one not captured, that he was the traitor. He asks Vanina to avenge him against whoever betrayed them, "even if it should be my own father."

Vanina tries to win Missirilli's freedom: she gets her suitor Livio Savelli, nephew to the governor of Rome, to bring her information and to gain places in the governor's household and at Castel Sant'Angelo for two of her own servants, saying that these are tests of Savelli's worthiness. The other carbonari's sentences are commuted by the Pope to a few years in prison, but Missirilli is condemned to death.

Vanina enters the house of Monsignor Catanzara, the governor of Rome, disguised as a man, and threatens him with a pistol, having unloaded his own pistol before he came home. She maneuvers the situation into a joke, a visit paid by a lady to her future uncle. She succeeds in getting him to try to commute the sentence; besides her persuasion, he is also motivated by the thought that he is still young and may see a day when the execution will be a stain on his character. Msgr. Catanzara obtains the pardon from the Pope.

When Missirilli and the other carbonari are transferred to a new prison, Vanina arranges to meet him in a chapel at midnight, where he will be chained and in sight of a jailer, but where their conversation will not be overheard. Vanina hopes that he still loves her enough to pardon her treachery.

Missirilli expresses regret for their affair, thinking that his misfortunes are punishment for having a passion other than Italian liberation. He wishes to remain friends, advises Vanina to marry Savelli, and promises that the money she contributed to the cause will be repaid when Italy is free. Vanina gives him the jewels she is wearing and files, so that he can use them to break his chains, but he asks her to forget him, for he is committed to dying for his country.

Vanina angrily tells him everything she has done to save his life; then she says that she has done much more out of love for him, and reveals her betrayal. Missirilli, outraged, tries to kill her with his chains, but the jailer rushes in and restrains him. He throws back at her the jewels she has just given him. Shortly after, she returns to Rome and marries Livio Savelli.

== Adaptations ==
In 1922, Arthur von Gerlach, Adapted this story to a film, Vanina, starring Asta Nielsen, Paul Wegener, Paul Hartmann.

Roberto Rossellini (1906–1977) adapted this story to a film of the same title in 1961 starring Sandra Milo (Vanina) and Laurent Terzieff (Pietro). In 1963, East German television broadcast a film based on the novel, starring Annekathrin Bürger in the title role, Peter Sturm as Asdrubale and Alfred Struwe as Savelli.
