= Vincenzo Russo (politician, born 1901) =

Italian politician

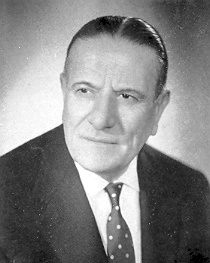
Vincenzo Mario Russo

Vincenzo Mario Russo (18 January 1901– 16 May 1976) was an Italian politician and lawyer.

A native of Foggia, Russo studied law and became a lawyer. He served on the Chamber of Deputies from 1963 to 1968, while affiliated with the Italian Democratic Socialist Party.
