= Lazzaroni (Naples) =

Poorest of the lower class in Naples during the Age of Revolution

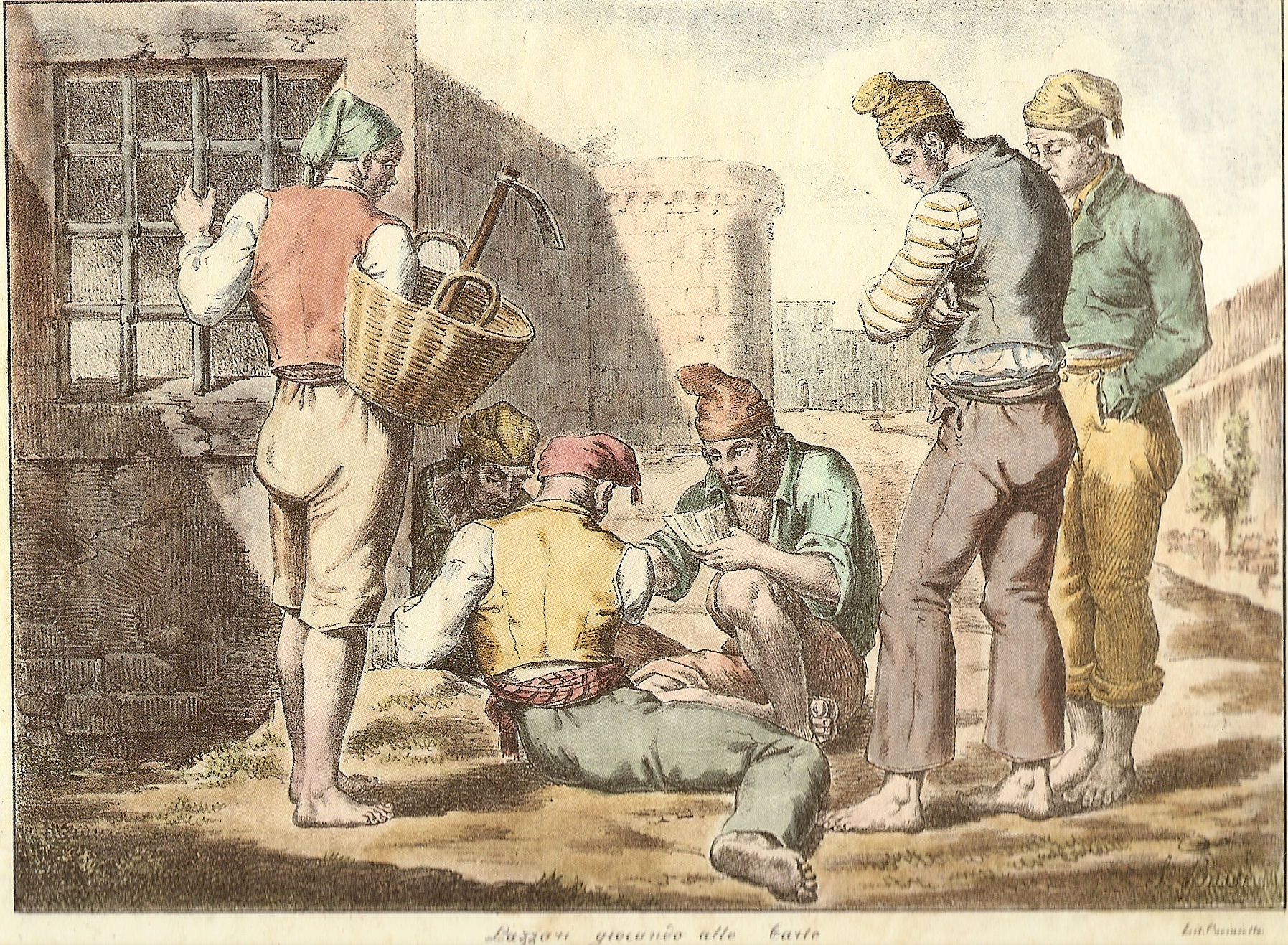
Lazzari playing cards, 1824

In the Age of Revolution, the Lazzaroni (or Lazzari) of Naples were the poorest of the lower class (Italian lazzaroni or lazzari, singular: lazzarone) in the city and Kingdom of Naples (in present-day Italy). Described as "street people under a chief", they were often depicted as "beggars"—which some actually were, while others subsisted partly by service as messengers, porters, etc. No precise census of them was ever conducted, but contemporaries estimated their total number at around 50,000, and they had a significant role in the social and political life of the city (and of the kingdom of which Naples was the capital). They were prone to act collectively as crowds and mobs and follow the lead of demagogues, often proving formidable in periods of civil unrest and revolution.

== Revolutionary period ==
At the time of the French Revolution, the Lazzaroni were staunchly monarchist in their political inclination—the diametrical opposite of the contemporary Parisian sans-culottes—with their (sometimes lethal) mob violence being directed against supposed republican and Jacobin sympathisers. For that reason, republicans at the time and later dismissed them as "tools of the absolutist government".

The Lazzaroni were fiercely loyal to the House of Bourbon and specifically to the person of King Ferdinand I who—unlike most monarchs of his and other times—did not keep an aristocratic distance but liked to mingle among the Lazzaroni and sport with them.

During the French military campaigns of the late 1790s, designed to export the Revolution to Italy (as to other parts of Europe), the regular Neapolitan troops did not particularly distinguish themselves against the French Army. The Lazzaroni, to the contrary, clamored to be armed and made a valiant effort to defend the city against the French—even though the royal family had already fled to Sicily. Some sources put as high as 2,000 the number of Lazzaroni who were killed on a single bloody day.

Though unable to stand in face-to-face fighting with trained troops (a contemporary drawing shows Lazzaroni being mowed down by a volley from French guns), their resistance ensured that the Parthenopaean Republic (which was established in Naples) had no popular base of support and could only rely on the repressive power of the French Army. Thus, it collapsed when the French needed to shift much of their troops elsewhere in Italy—whereupon the Lazzaroni exacted acts of retribution upon that republic's adherents.

Friedrich Engels wrote about the Neapolitan lumpenproletariat during the repression of the 1848 Revolution in Naples:

"This action of the Neapolitan lumpenproletariat decided the defeat of the revolution. Swiss guardsmen, Neapolitan soldiers and lazzaroni combined pounced upon the defenders of the barricades."

== The Lazzaroni and Garibaldi ==
By the mid-19th century, the Bourbons gradually lost the support of the Naples Lazzaroni. This was fully evident by 1860 when Garibaldi arrived in the city at the climax of his campaign for the unification of Italy.

As mentioned in many eyewitness reports, when entering Naples after the Bourbon King fled, Garibaldi received a tumultuous welcome from the Lazzaroni, as from other sections of Naples' population. Journalist Charles Arrivabene wrote at the time:

"Garibaldi was accompanied by a great procession along the seafront to Piedigrotta (...) He was cheered by fishermen and lazzaroni, and women shouted 'May the blessed Virgin be with you, Eccellenza!'".

Another observer, Marc Monnier, noted that

"Garibaldi is a saint for les lazzarones. It is God who had sent him to save the country. Several call him Jesus Christ, and his officers are the apostles. Alms are asked in Garibaldi's name".

== See also ==
- Lumpenproletariat
