= Red Shirts (film) =

1952 film

- Directed by: Goffredo Alessandrini; Francesco Rosi
- Written by: Enzo Biagi; Renzo Renzi; Sandro Bolchi; Mario Serandrei; Suso Cecchi D'Amico; Nino Frank; Anna Magnani
- Produced by: Luigi Carpentieri; Domenico Forges Davanzati; Giovanni Chiminelli
- Starring: Anna Magnani; Raf Vallone; Alain Cuny; Jacques Sernas
- Cinematography: Leonida Barboni; Mario Parapetti; Marco Scarpelli
- Edited by: Mario Serandrei
- Music by: Enzo Masetti
- Production company: Grandi Film
- Distributed by: Grandi Film
- Release date: 15 August 1952
- Running time: 99 minutes
- Country: Italy
- Language: Italian

Red Shirts (Italian: Camicie rosse) is a 1952 French-Italian historical drama film directed by Goffredo Alessandrini and Francesco Rosi and starring Anna Magnani, Raf Vallone and Alain Cuny. The title refers to the historical Redshirts. It is also known as Anita Garibaldi. The film portrays the life of Anita Garibaldi (1821–1849), the wife of Italian unification leader Giuseppe Garibaldi.

== Cast ==
- Anna Magnani as Anita Garibaldi
- Raf Vallone as Giuseppe Garibaldi
- Alain Cuny as Bueno
- Jacques Sernas as Gentile
- Carlo Ninchi as Ciceruacchio
- Enzo Cerusico as Il figlio di Ciceruacchio
- Gino Leurini as Andrea
- Mario Monosilio as Giovanni
- Marisa Natale as Rosa
- Emma Baron as La signora Guiccioli
- Carlo Duse as Bonnert
- Cesare Fantoni as Il generale Oudinot
- Rodolfo Lodi as Il colonello Forbes
- Bruno Smith as Gustavo Mioni
- Pietro Tordi as Carlo Ferrari
- Piero Pastore Pietro Fadini
- Luigi Esposito as L'oste
- Serge Reggiani as Lantini

== Bibliography ==
- Moliterno, Gino. The A to Z of Italian Cinema. Scarecrow Press, 2009.
