= Nino Frank =

French film critic

- Born: 27 June 1904 Barletta, Puglia, Kingdom of Italy
- Died: 17 August 1989 (aged 80) Paris, France
- Occupation: Novelist; poet; short story writer; translator; literary critic; essayist

Nino Frank (27 June 1904 − 17 August 1988) was an Italian-born French film critic and writer who was most active in the 1930s and 1940s. Frank is best known for being the first film critic to use the term "film noir" to refer to 1940s US crime drama films such as The Maltese Falcon.

== Career ==
Nino Frank was born in Barletta, in the southern region of Apulia, a busy port town on Italy's Adriatic coast.

In the late 1920s, Frank was a supporter of the Irish writer James Joyce, along with a circle that also included Moune Gilbert, Stuart Gilbert (who helped to make the French translation of Ulysses in 1929), Paul and Lucie Léon, Louis Gillet, and Samuel Beckett. In 1937, Frank conferred a great deal with Joyce about the Italian translation of Joyce's Anna Livia Plurabelle.

During the Second World War and the Nazi occupation of France, Frank wrote for the collaborationist weekly Les Nouveaux Temps, but he was known as a critic of the collaborationist Vichy government's censorship policies. He also wrote for the French film magazine L'Écran français, a socialist-leaning magazine founded by the Resistance during the war, which continued after it. The magazine had the backing of French film directors such as Jacques Becker, Marcel Carné, Jean Grémillon, and Jean Painlevé; writer/scenarists Pierre Bost and Jacques Prévert; critics Georges Sadoul and Léon Moussinac; as well as Albert Camus, Henri Langlois, André Malraux, Pablo Picasso and Jean-Paul Sartre. L'Écran français was a "serious publication"; in contrast to other film magazines with their "cheesecake" photos and star gossip, L'Écran français was printed on yellow paper and carried articles on a range of film criticism issues written by critics and notable figures from French cinema. Frank eventually rose to the position of editor-in-chief of L'Écran français.

According to the Internet Movie Database (IMDb), Frank had several writing credits for film and television production. In 1944, he penned the dialogue for Service de nuit and adapted the novel for the screen. In 1945, he was responsible for a film adaption of La Vie de bohème. In 1947, he is credited for La Taverne du poisson couronné ("Confessions of a Rogue"), and in 1952, he is credited with Red Shirts (Les chemises rouges in France or Camicie rosse in Italy). In 1974, Frank is credited with adapting the novel Stefano for a TV production. Frank also did other writing and translation work, such as translating Leonardo Sciascia's 1979 book Nero su nero ("Black on Black") from its original Italian, in collaboration with Corinne Lucas.

He died in Paris in 1988.

== The term "film noir" ==
Frank is often given credit for coining the term "film noir" to describe a group of American drama films that were shown in French theaters in the summer of 1946: John Huston's The Maltese Falcon, Otto Preminger’s Laura, Edward Dmytryk’s Murder, My Sweet, Billy Wilder’s Double Indemnity, and Fritz Lang's The Woman in the Window. During the Nazi occupation of France, US films were not allowed in France, and so the summer of 1946 was the first opportunity for French audiences to see these US World War II-era movies.

In 1946, Frank and fellow critic Jean-Pierre Chartier wrote two film articles that described Hollywood crime dramas from the 1940s as "film noir". Frank’s article, "Un nouveau genre 'policier': L'aventure criminelle" ("A new police genre: the criminal adventure") was published in the socialist-leaning film magazine L'écran français in August 1946. Frank's article listed "… rejection of sentimental humanism, the social fantastic, and the dynamism of violent death" as being obsessive French noir themes and called attention to the American proclivity for "criminal psychology and misogyny". Frank's article stated that "these 'dark' films, these films noirs, no longer have anything in common with the ordinary run of detective movies", and the article "reflects the difficulty of finding a suitable label for these dark films."

Frank's article states that the noir films "belong to what used to be called the detective film genre, but which would now be better termed the crime, or, even better yet, the "crime psychology film". Jean-Pierre Chartier's essay, from November 1946, appeared in the conservative-leaning Revue du cinema, titled "Les Américains aussi font des films 'noirs'" ("the Americans also make 'black' films"), and criticized what he deemed the common thread of film noir, the "pessimism and disgust for humanity". Frank and Chartier's use of the term "film noir" may have been inspired by Gallimard's series of "hard-boiled" detective and crime fiction books called the Série Noire, which included both translated works by American writers and books authored by French writers that were modeled on the US crime novel style. French writers Thomas Narcejac and Pierre Boileau, who wrote several novels that were adapted into films, may also deserve some credit for developing the term "film noir". Narcejac and Boileau's novel D'entre les morts was adapted into Alfred Hitchcock's Vertigo, and their novel Celle qui n'était plus was adapted into the Henri-Georges Clouzot's Diabolique.

=== Earlier use ===
Charles O'Brien's research indicates that the term "film noir" was used in French film reviews and newspaper articles in 1938 and 1939, to refer to French films such as Le Quai des brumes (1937) by Marcel Carné and La Bête humaine (1938) by Jean Renoir. O'Brien states that he found a "dozen explicit invocations of film noir" in the late 1930s, such as the paper L'Intransigeant, which called Quai des brumes a "film noir" and the newspaper Action française, in which a January 1938 film review by Francois Vinneuil called Le Puritain "un sujet classique: le film noir, plongeant dans la débauche et le crime" ("a classic subject: the film noir plunging in debauchery and crime"). O'Brien points out that the term "film noir" seems to have been first coined by the political right-wing and that may be because many – but not all – of the film noirs were from the poetic realist movement that was closely associated with the leftist Popular Front.
