= Alexandre Gonsse de Rougeville =

French couter-revolutionary

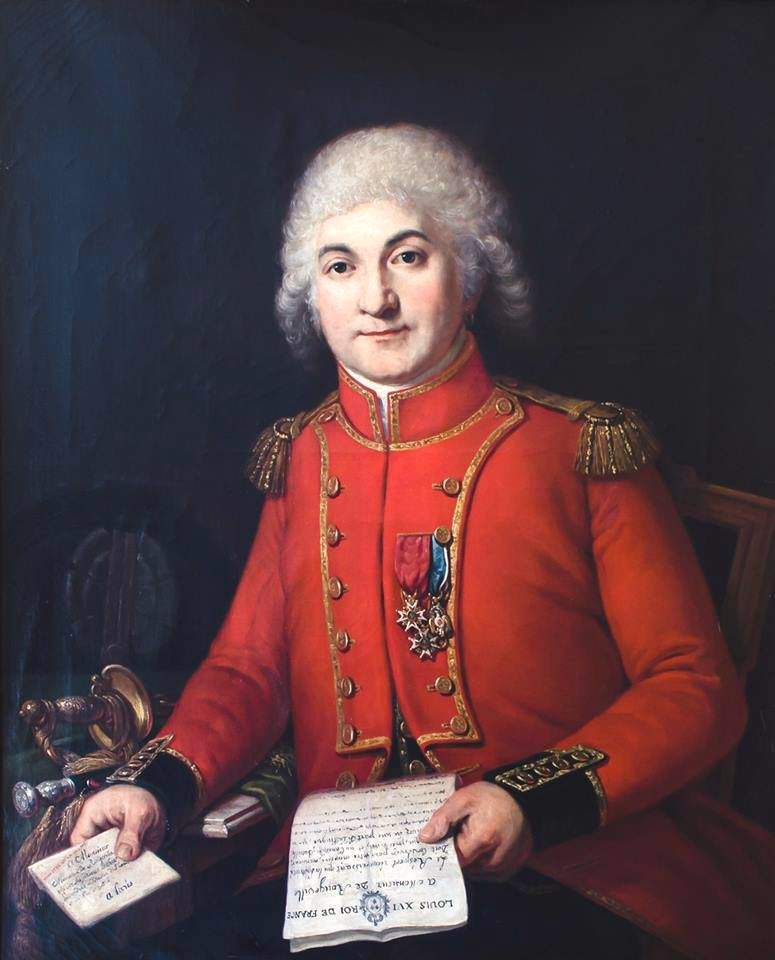
A painting of Rougeville

Alexandre Gonsse de Rougeville (1761–1814) was a French counter-revolutionary. He was later immortalized by Alexandre Dumas under the name of Chevalier de Maison Rouge. He started the Carnation Plot, and later escaped.
