= Sandro Bolchi =

Italian television and theatre director (1924–2005)

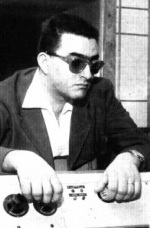
- Born: Sandro Bolchi; 18 January 1924; Voghera, Italy
- Died: 2 August 2005 (aged 81); Rome, Italy
- Occupations: Film director, actor

Sandro Bolchi (18 January 1924 – 2 August 2005) was an Italian director, actor and journalist.

== Biography ==
Bolchi was born in Voghera, Italy on 18 January 1924. He died on 2 August 2005 in Rome, Italy.

== Background ==
Born in Voghera, Bolchi, who was graduated in literature, made his debut as an actor in the "Guf" theater in Trieste, an experience that continued even after he moved to Bologna, where he also began his activity as journalist and stage director. In 1956 he made his directorial debut on television with Frana allo Scalo Nord, since then he directed a large number of successful TV dramas, mostly based on masterpieces of nineteenth-century literature.

== Selected filmography ==
- Red Shirts (1952)
