= Teresa Casati =

Italian noblewoman and revolutionary (1787–1830)

Teresa Casati Confalonieri
- Countess
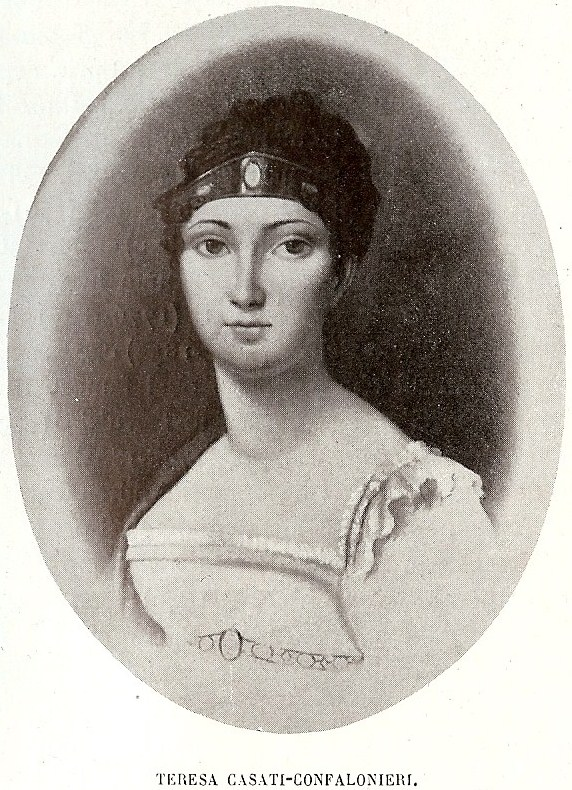
- Teresa Casati-Confalonieri in a book printed in 1909

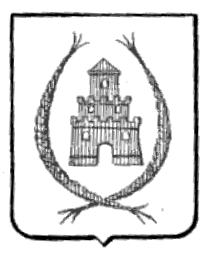
- Coat of arms
- Born: Teresa Casati; 17 September 1787; Milan, Italy
- Died: 26 September 1830 (aged 43); Erba, Italy
- Buried: Mausoleo Casati Stampa di Soncino
- Spouse: Federico Confalonieri (m. 1806)

Teresa Casati Confalonieri (17 September 1787 – 26 September 1830) was an Italian noblewoman and revolutionist. She is known as the wife of revolutionist Federico Confalonieri, sister of former Prime Minister of the Kingdom of Sardinia, Gabrio Casati, and as an important figure in the Risorgimento.

== Biography ==
=== Early life ===
Teresa Casati was born in Milan into the Lombard noble Casati family. She was the eldest daughter of Count Gaspare Casati and his first wife Maria Orrigoni of Ello, and the elder sister of Gabrio Casati. Casati was raised by her father's second wife, Luigia dei Conti Settala. Casati was withdrawn during much of her youth, for her mother died when she was only six years old, but many people considered her beautiful. Giovanni Arrivabene wrote that she was a "donna in cui la bellezza, la grazia, i gentili modi armonizzavano mirabil- mente insieme" meaning "woman in whom beauty, grace and gentle manners harmonized wonderfully together", Ugo Foscolo wrote that she was "Giovinetta santa e bellissima", meaning "A young, holy and beautiful girl", and she was proposed to by the Duke of Pasquier, but was dissuaded by her father.

=== Marriage ===
After meeting at a ball, Count Federico Confalonieri and Casati fell in love. His father's mother asked for Casati's hand in marriage, to which her father agreed, and in 1806, Teresa Casati married Count Federico Confalonieri, an aristocrat and figure in the Milanese patriotic movement. The couple had one son, Francesco (14 August 1807 – 2 June 1813), who died after being dropped.

Casati served as a lady-in-waiting to Princess Augusta of Bavaria, wife of Eugène de Beauharnais and daughter of Maximilian I Joseph of Bavaria, despite the Confalonieri family not being Bonapartist.

=== Role in the Risorgimento ===
Casati often acted as a go-between for her husband and other revolutionaries back in Milan when he was away, reading letters he would send and letting the others know. Others would also sometimes write to him from her desk.

In 1819 Casati and her husband petitioned the government to build schools in Milan. She was called "una fervida proteggitrice delle scuole di mutuo insegnamento", meaning "a fervent protector of mutual teaching schools", by Bianca Milesi. Later, in May 1820, the Austrian authorities put a stop to the schools, worried that the educated masses would lead to revolt against them. They did not say this directly, instead pointing at the school's association with known revolutionaries.

Casati was part of the Carbonari, a secret society associated with the Risorgimento. In a letter to the Austrian authorities, the five anonymous authors claim that she offered to kill Ferdinand, Graf Bubna von Littitz with her own stiletto, which all Carbonari carry. Her husband, during an interrogation, denied these allegations.

In the middle of the night on 13 December 1821, Federico Confalonieri was arrested at his home in Milan by Austrian authorities and taken to the Santa Margherita prison, and later moved to another prison in Milan. Teresa was not allowed to see her husband for a year, and would often be seen wearing mourning dress. Only in the summer of 1823 were they allowed to see each other again. They were allowed visits, although they were guarded and short. They were, however, allowed to send letters. On Christmas Eve 1823 she traveled to Vienna, accompanied by her brother and her husband's father and brother, to ask for pardon from the Emperor of Austria, Francis I, but he only confirmed that he had already sent the death sentence, and cannot overturn that decision. Not giving up, she went to the Empress, Caroline Augusta of Bavaria, and convinced her to help. The Empress attempted to change the Emperor's mind, and eventually he relented and had the sentence suspended. On 21 January 1824, a new sentence was read before Confalonieri, life imprisonment in Špilberk Castle. Before leaving he was allowed to embrace his wife one last time. Casati asked Marie Louise, Duchess of Parma if she could ask her father, the Emperor, if she could move to Brünn to be close to the prison, but this request was declined. Many plans were made over the years to have him escape, but none succeeded.

=== Death ===
Teresa Casati Confalonieri died of consumption on 26 September 1830, before witnessing her husband's release. She and her husband had continued exchanging letters for a while after he was sent to Špilberk, but when she died, for about four and a half months after, Confalonieri, not yet aware of the news, continued to send her letters. She was buried in the Casati family tomb.

An epitaph was inscribed on her tomb, written by Alessandro Manzoni.

TERESA, NATA DA GASPARE CASATI E DA MARIA ORIGONI IL 18 SETTEMBRE 1787, MARI- TATA A FEDERICO CONFALONIERI IL 14 SETTEM- BRE 1806, ORNÒ MODESTAMENTE LA PROSPERA SORTE DI LUI, L'AFFLITTA SOCCORSE CON L'OPERA E PARTECIPÒ CON L'ANIMO, QUANTO AD OPERA E AD ANIMO UMANO È CONCEDUTO. CONSUNTA, MA NON VINTA DAL CORDOGLIO, MORÌ SPERANDO NEL SIGNORE DEI DEBOLI IL 26 SETTEMBRE 1830. GABRIO, ANGELO, CAMILLO CASATI, ALLA SORELLA AMATISSIMA ED AMANTISSIMA ERESSERO, ED A SE PREPARARONO QUESTO MONUMENTO PER RIPOSARE UN GIORNO ACCANTO ALLE OSSA CARE E VENERATE. VALE INTANTO, ANIMA FORTE E SOAVE, NOI, PORGENDO TUTTAVIA PRECI ED OFFRENDO SACRIFICI PER TE, CONFIDIAMO CHE ACCOLTA NELLA ETERNA LUCE, DISCERNI ORA I MISTERI DI MISERICORDIA, NASCOSTI QUAGGIÙ NEI RIGORI DI DIO.

[Teresa, born to Gaspare Casati and Maria Origoni on 18 September 1787, and married to Federico Confalonieri on 14 September 1806, modestly adorned his prosperous life, aided the afflicted with her actions and shared in their suffering with her spirit, as much as is granted to human action and spirit. Consumed, but not defeated by sorrow, she died hoping in the Lord of the weak on 26 September 1830. Gabrio, Angelo, and Camillo Casati erected this monument to their beloved and loving sister, and prepared it for themselves to one day rest beside her dear and revered remains. Farewell, strong and gentle soul; meanwhile, we, still offering prayers and sacrifices for you, trust that, welcomed into eternal light, you now discern the mysteries of mercy, hidden here below in the rigors of God.]

— Alessandro Manzoni

== Legacy ==
An exhibit at the Spazio Oberdan in Milan titled Rose d'Italia: "Il Risorgimento invisibile" lombardo (meaning Roses of Italy: "The invisible Risorgimento" in Lombardy), which opened on 28 September 2011, featured Teresa Casati Confalonieri.

The City of Muggiò Theatre Competition created an award named after Teresa Casati Confalonieri in 2024.

=== In film ===
- Loyalty of Love, about her life
- Il conte Aquila, about her husband's life

== See also ==
- Risorgimento
- Federico Confalonieri
- Gabrio Casati
