= Luisa Sanfelice (2004 film) =

- Written by: Paolo and Vittorio Taviani
- Directed by: Paolo and Vittorio Taviani
- Starring: Laetitia Casta
- Theme music composer: Nicola Piovani
- Country of origin: Italy
- Original language: Italian

Production
- Producer: Riccardo Tozzi
- Cinematography: Franco Di Giacomo
- Editor: Roberto Perpignani
- Running time: 200 minutes

Original release
- Release: 25 January 2004

Luisa Sanfelice is a 2004 Italian historical film directed by Paolo and Vittorio Taviani. It stars Laetitia Casta and was co-produced between Italy and France. It is an adaptation of a book by Alexandre Dumas.

== Plot ==
The film is about the life of Luisa Sanfelice, a young member of the Neapolitan nobility who is in love with a republican, Salvato Palmieri. In the wake of the French Revolution a Napoleonic army led by general Jean-Étienne Championnet enters in Naples. Horatio Nelson receives the duty to organise the exile of King Ferdinand to Palermo. After the court has fled the Parthenopean Republic is proclaimed in January 1799. Also Luisa's husband, Cavaliere Luciano Sanfelice, has gone, but she stays. Luisa becomes symbolic of the hated nobility though she supports the revolution. In June of the same year Naples is taken by the royalist troops conducted by cardinal Fabrizio Ruffo. Ferdinand returns to the town: with his well-known brutality he orders several massacres and the elimination of all opponents. 50000 Neapoletans are left dead. Disregarding the outrage of the population Ferdinand puts Luisa to death on 11 September 1800.

== Cast ==
- Laetitia Casta as Luisa Sanfelice
- Adriano Giannini as Salvato Palmieri
- Cecilia Roth as Maria Carolina
- Marie Baumer as Lady Emma Hamilton
- Emilio Solfrizzi as King Ferdinand I
- Lello Arena as Pasquale De Simone
- Linda Batista as Eleonora de Fonseca Pimentel
- Mariano Rigillo as Cavaliere Luciano Sanfelice
- Carmelo Gómez as Cardinal Fabrizio Ruffo
- Jean-Yves Berteloot as Jean-Étienne Championnet
- Margarita Lozano as Marga
- Johannes Silberschneider as Horatio Nelson
- Yari Gugliucci as Michele
- Teresa Saponangelo as Assunta
- José Ángel Egido as Dottore Cirillo

== See also ==
- List of Italian films of 2004
