= Luisa Sanfelice =

Italian aristocrat executed during the French Revolutionary Wars

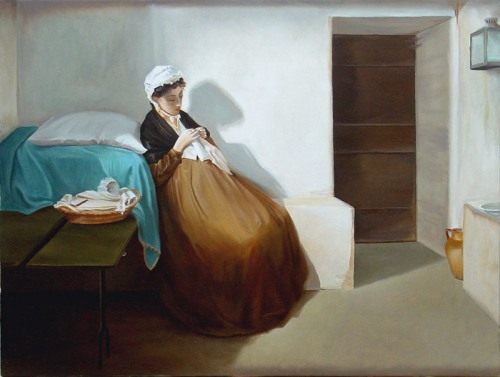
Luisa Sanfelice painted by Giovacchino Toma.

Luisa or Luigia Sanfelice (1764–1800) was an Italian aristocrat who was executed by Ferdinand I of the Two Sicilies because of her involvement with the French-backed Parthenopean Republic during the French Revolutionary Wars, although Sanfelice was largely apolitical. As she was generally regarded as the innocent victim of circumstances, she became a legendary figure who was widely portrayed in popular culture. During the nineteenth century, she was often depicted as a gentle and naïve beauty whose story closely resembled that of the fictional Fioria Tosca, the heroine of the Puccini opera Tosca.

Amongst those who have depicted Sanfelice's story are the French writer Alexandre Dumas, who wrote the novel La San Felice in 1864, and the artist Giovacchino Toma, who painted Luisa Sanfelice in Carcere in 1874, showing her in captivity before her execution. In the twentieth century, Sanfelice was portrayed in two films, Luisa Sanfelice (1942) and Luisa Sanfelice (2004).

== Bibliography ==
- Lancaster, Jordan. In the Shadow of Vesuvius: A Cultural History of Naples. I.B.Tauris, 2005.
- Nicassio, Susan Vandiver. Tosca's Rome: The Play and the Opera in Historical Perspective. University of Chicago Press, 2002.
