= Leo Menardi =

Italian screenwriter and film director

- Born: 20 November 1903; Turin, Piedmont; Italy
- Died: 11 December 1954 (aged 51); Rome, Lazio; Italy
- Occupations: Director; Screenwriter
- Years active: 1930–1953

Leo Menardi (1903–1954) was an Italian screenwriter, producer and film director. He also worked as editor and assistant director on The Song of Love (1930), the first Italian sound film. In 1942 he wrote and directed Luisa Sanfelice.

== Selected filmography ==
- The Song of Love (1930)
- The Devil's Lantern (1931)
- One Night with You (1932)
- The Haller Case (1933)
- Unripe Fruit (1934)
- Luisa Sanfelice (1942)
- Annabella's Adventure (1943)
- Storm (1954)

== Bibliography ==
- Marrone, Gaetana & Puppa, Paolo. Encyclopedia of Italian Literary Studies. Routledge, 2006.
