= Luisa Sanfelice (1942 film) =

- Directed by: Leo Menardi
- Written by: Alexandre Dumas (novel); Franco Riganti; Vittorio Mussolini; Gherardo Gherardi; Luigi Chiarelli; Leo Menardi
- Starring: Laura Solari; Massimo Serato; Osvaldo Valenti; Carlo Ninchi
- Cinematography: Piero Portalupi; Václav Vích
- Edited by: Fernando Tropea
- Music by: Renzo Rossellini
- Production company: Alleanza Cinematografica Italiana
- Distributed by: Alleanza Cinematografica Italiana
- Release date: 19 September 1942
- Running time: 75 minutes
- Country: Italy
- Language: Italian

Luisa Sanfelice is a 1942 Italian historical drama film directed by Leo Menardi and starring Laura Solari, Massimo Serato and Osvaldo Valenti. The film is an adaptation of a novel by Alexandre Dumas based on the story of Luisa Sanfelice (1764-1800) an Italian aristocrat executed in Naples by Ferdinand I for supporting a Republican attempt to overthrow him during the French Revolutionary Wars. Horatio Nelson and Lady Hamilton both feature prominently.

It was made at the Cinecittà Studios in Rome. One of the film's screenwriters was Vittorio Mussolini, the son of dictator Benito Mussolini, who was heavily involved in the Italian film industry. The film's sets were designed by Virgilio Marchi.

== Main cast ==
- Laura Solari as Luisa Sanfelice
- Massimo Serato as Ferdinando Ferri
- Osvaldo Valenti as Nelson
- Carlo Ninchi as Il banchiere Gerardo Bacher
- Hilde Sessak as Lady Hamilton
- Stelio Carnabuci as Andrea Sanfelice - marito de Luisa
- Ada Dondini as Donna Camilla Molinis
- Armando Migliari as Lord Aston
- Jole Ferrari as la principessa Clementina
- Amelia Perrella as Domestica di casa Sanfelice
- Amina Pirani Maggi as Una popplana
- Oreste Fares as Amico fedele di donna Camilla
- Achille Majeroni as Altro amico di donna Camilla

== Bibliography ==
- Marrone, Gaetana & Puppa, Paolo. Encyclopedia of Italian Literary Studies. Routledge, 2006.
