= Parthenopean Republic =

Republic in Southern Italy in 1799

Parthenopean Republic Repubblica Partenopea (Italian) République Parthénopéenne (French)
- 1799
- Flag Emblem
- Motto: Libertà e Uguaglianza (Italian) Freedom and Equality
- Anthem: La Nazionale (Inno alla Repubblica Partenopea) "Hymn to the Parthenopean Republic"
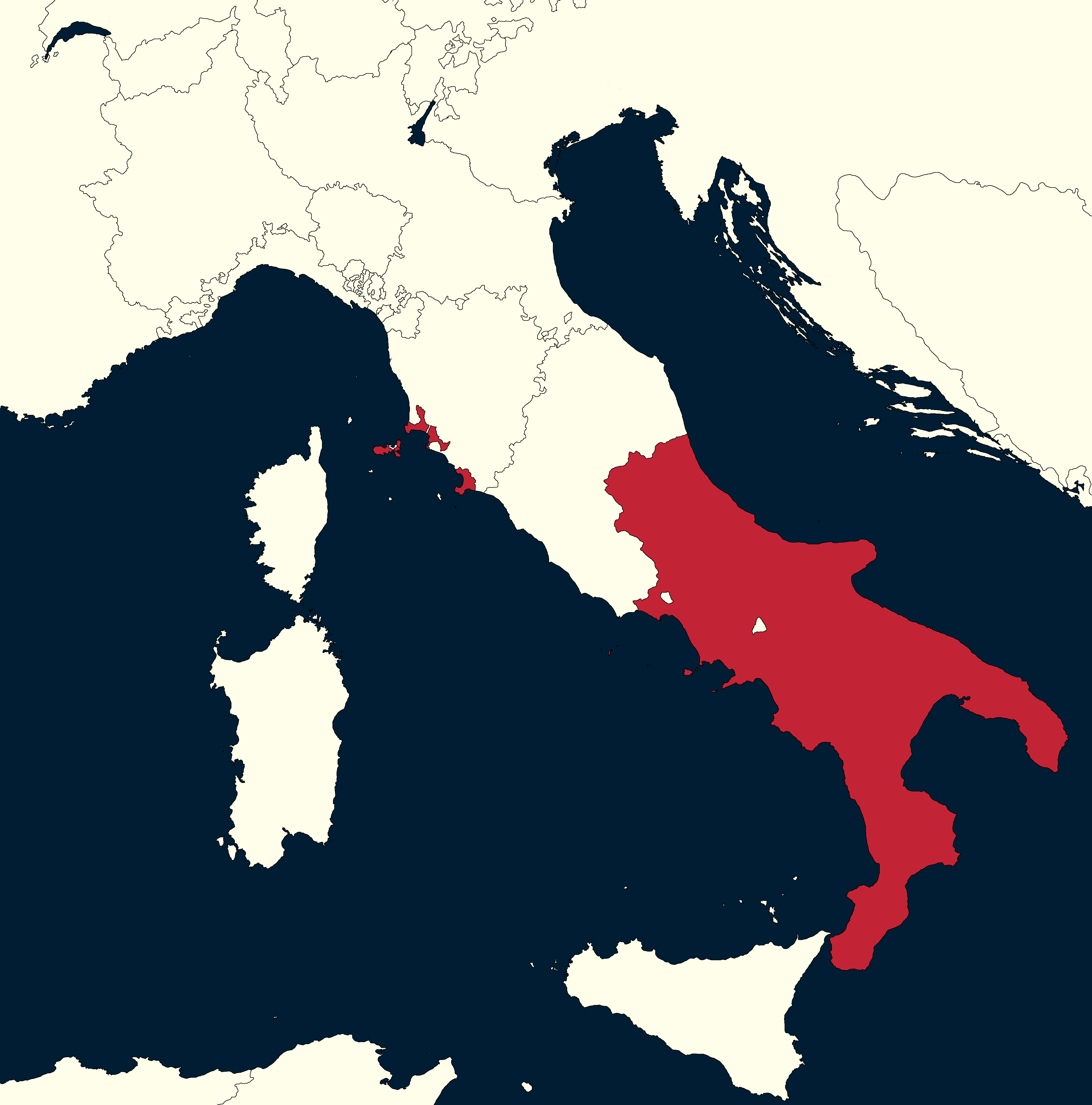
- Status: client state of France
- Capital: Naples
- Common languages: Italian; Neapolitan
- Religion: Roman Catholicism
- Government: Republic
- Director
  - 1799: Carlo Lauberg
  - 1799: Ignazio Ciaia
- Legislature: Legislative Council
- Historical era: French Revolutionary Wars
  - French invasion: 21 January 1799
  - Sicilian invasion: 13 June 1799
- Currency: Tornesel, Neapolitan carlino
Preceded by	Succeeded by
Kingdom of Naples	Kingdom of Naples
- Today part of: Italy

The Parthenopean Republic (Italian: Repubblica Partenopea, French: République Parthénopéenne) or Neapolitan Republic (Italian: Repubblica Napoletana) was a short-lived sister republic in Southern Italy established during the French Revolutionary Wars following the defeat of the armies of Ferdinand IV. The republic existed from 21 January to 13 June 1799, collapsing when the Sanfedists returned Ferdinand to power, after which he harshly subdued republican activities.

== Etymology ==
The Parthenopean Republic is named after Parthenope, an ancient Greek settlement now part of the city of Naples.

== Origins of the Republic ==
On the outbreak of the French Revolution King Ferdinand IV of Naples and Queen Maria Carolina did not at first actively oppose reform; but after the fall of the French monarchy they became violently opposed to it, and in 1793, joined the first coalition against France, instituting severe persecutions against all who were remotely suspected of French sympathies. Republicanism, however, gained ground, especially among the aristocracy.

In 1796, peace with France was concluded, but in 1798, during Napoleon's absence in Egypt and after Nelson's victory at the Battle of the Nile, Maria Carolina induced Ferdinand to go to war with France once more. Nelson himself arrived at Naples in September 1798, where he was enthusiastically received. The Neapolitan army had 70,000 men hastily summoned under the command of the Austrian general Karl Mack. On 29 November, this army entered Rome, which had been evacuated by the French, wishing to restore Papal authority. However, after a sudden French counter-attack, his troops were forced to retreat and were eventually routed. A contemporary satirist said of the King's conquest of Rome: "He came, he saw, he fled".

The King hurried back to Naples. Although the lazzaroni (the lowest class of the people) were devoted to the Bourbon dynasty and ready to defend it, he embarked on Nelson's Vanguard and fled with his court to Palermo in a panic. Prince Francesco Pignatelli Strongoli took over the city and the fleet was burned.

The wildest confusion prevailed, and the lazzaroni massacred numbers of persons suspected of republican sympathies, while the nobility and the educated classes, finding themselves abandoned by their King, began to contemplate a republic under French auspices to avoid anarchy. On 12 January 1799, Pignatelli signed in Sparanise the surrender to the French general Jean Étienne Championnet. Pignatelli also fled to Palermo on 16 January 1799.

When the news of the surrender to the French reached Naples and the provinces, the lazzaroni rebelled. Though ill-armed and ill-disciplined, they resisted the enemy with desperate courage. In the meantime, the Jacobin and Republican parties of Naples surged, and civil war broke out. On 20 January 1799, the Republicans under General Championnet conquered the fortress of Castel Sant'Elmo, and the French entered the city the next day. The casualties were 8,000 Neapolitans and 1,000 French.

== Republic ==
On 21 or 23 January 1799, the Parthenopean Republic was proclaimed. The name referred to an ancient Greek colony Parthenope on the site of the future city of Naples. The Republic had no real domestic constituency and existed solely due to the power of the French Army. The Republic's leaders were men of culture, high character and birth, such as Gennaro Serra, Prince of Cassano Irpino but they were doctrinaire and impractical, and they knew very little of the lower classes of their own country. The new government soon found itself in financial difficulties, owing to Championnet's demands for money (he was later relieved for corruption); it failed to organise an army (and was therefore dependent on French protection) and met with little success in its attempts to "democratise" the provinces.

Meanwhile, the court at Palermo sent Cardinal Fabrizio Ruffo, a wealthy and influential prelate, to Calabria to organize a counter-revolution. He succeeded beyond expectation with his "Christian army of the Holy Faith" (Esercito Cristiano della Santa Fede). A British squadron approached Naples and occupied the island of Procida, but after a few engagements with the Republican fleet commanded by Francesco Caracciolo, an ex-officer in the Bourbon navy, it was recalled to Palermo, as the Franco–Spanish fleet was expected.

Ruffo, supported by Russian and Turkish ships under the command of Admiral Ushakov, now marched on the capital, whence the French, except for a small force under Louis-Joseph Mejan, withdrew. The scattered Republican detachments were defeated, only Naples and Pescara holding out.

On 13 June 1799. Ruffo and his troops reached Naples, and after a desperate battle at the Ponte della Maddalena, entered the city. For weeks the Calabresi and lazzaroni continued to pillage and massacre, and Ruffo was unable, even if willing, to restrain them. However, the Royalists were not masters of the city, for the French in Castel Sant'Elmo and the Republicans in Castel Nuovo and Castel dell'Ovo still held out and bombarded the streets, while the Franco-Spanish fleet might arrive at any moment. Consequently, Ruffo was desperately anxious to come to terms with the Republicans for the evacuation of the castles, in spite of the Queen's orders to make no terms with the rebels. After some negotiation, the parties concluded an armistice and agreed on capitulation (onorevole capitolazione), whereby the castles were to be evacuated, the hostages liberated and the garrisons free to remain in Naples unmolested or to sail for Toulon. The capitulation was signed by Ruffo, and British, Russian and Turkish officers, as well as, for the Republicans, the French commander.

While the vessels were being prepared for the voyage to Toulon all the hostages in the castles were liberated save four; but on 24 June 1799, Nelson arrived with his fleet, and on hearing of the capitulation he refused to recognise it except insofar as it concerned the French. Cardinal Ruffo indignantly declared that once the treaty was signed, not only by himself but by the Russian and Turkish commandants and by the British captain Edward Foote, it must be respected, and on Nelson's refusal, he said that he would not help him to capture the castles. On 26 June 1799, Nelson changed his attitude and authorised Sir William Hamilton, the British minister, to inform the cardinal that he (Nelson) would do nothing to break the armistice; while Captains Bell and Troubridge wrote that they had Nelson's authority to state that the latter would not oppose the embarcation of the Republicans. Although these expressions were equivocal, the Republicans were satisfied and embarked on the vessels prepared for them. However, on 28 June, Nelson received despatches from the court (in reply to his own), in consequence of which he had the vessels brought under the guns of his ships, and many of the Republicans were arrested. Caracciolo, who had been caught whilst attempting to escape from Naples, was tried by a court-martial of Royalist officers under Nelson's auspices on board the admiral's flagship, condemned to death and hanged at the yard arm. The last Jacobin stronghold, Pescara, surrendered on June 30.

=== Republic of Pescara ===
Republic of Pescara Repubblica Pescarese
- 1799–1799
- Flag of the Republic of Pescara
- Status: Client state of the French First Republic; Part of the Parthenopean Republic
- Capital: Pescara
- Common languages: Italian, Neapolitan
- Government: Republic
- President of the Supreme Council
- Historical era: French Revolutionary Wars
  - Republic proclaimed: January 1799
  - Bourbon restoration: 30 June 1799
Succeeded by
Kingdom of Naples
- Today part of: Part of Italy

The Republic of Pescara (Italian: Repubblica Pescarese) is a name used to describe the short-lived provisional Jacobin government established in the fortress city of Pescara in 1799. It was a client state of the French First Republic and part of the wider Parthenopean Republic.

In December 1798, French troops under General Duhesme captured the fortress of Pescara as part of the French invasion of the Kingdom of Naples. Following the French advance, republican sympathizers, known as Jacobins, established provisional governments in several cities. In the Abruzzo region, this led to the formation of a temporary republican administration with Pescara becoming a key political, administrative, and military center.

The government in Pescara was established in January 1799. The prominent intellectual and politician Melchiorre Delfico was appointed president of the "Supremo Consiglio di Pescara" (Supreme Council of Pescara). Pescara-born General Gabriele Manthoné was another leading figure of this period, serving as the Minister of War for the broader Parthenopean Republic in Naples.

The Republic of Pescara was an integral part of the Parthenopean Republic, which had divided the former kingdom's territory into departments. The Parthenopean administration created a Supreme Council seated at Pescara, which functioned as the chief local political and administrative authority. The existence of the republican government in Pescara was brief. Pescara was the last Jacobin stronghold in the region to surrender, capitulating on June 30, 1799. Following the restoration, many republicans, including Gabriele Manthoné, were arrested and executed, while Melchiorre Delfico managed to escape into exile.

==== Flag ====
The flag of the Republic of Pescara was a vertical bicolor of yellow and red.

== Aftermath ==
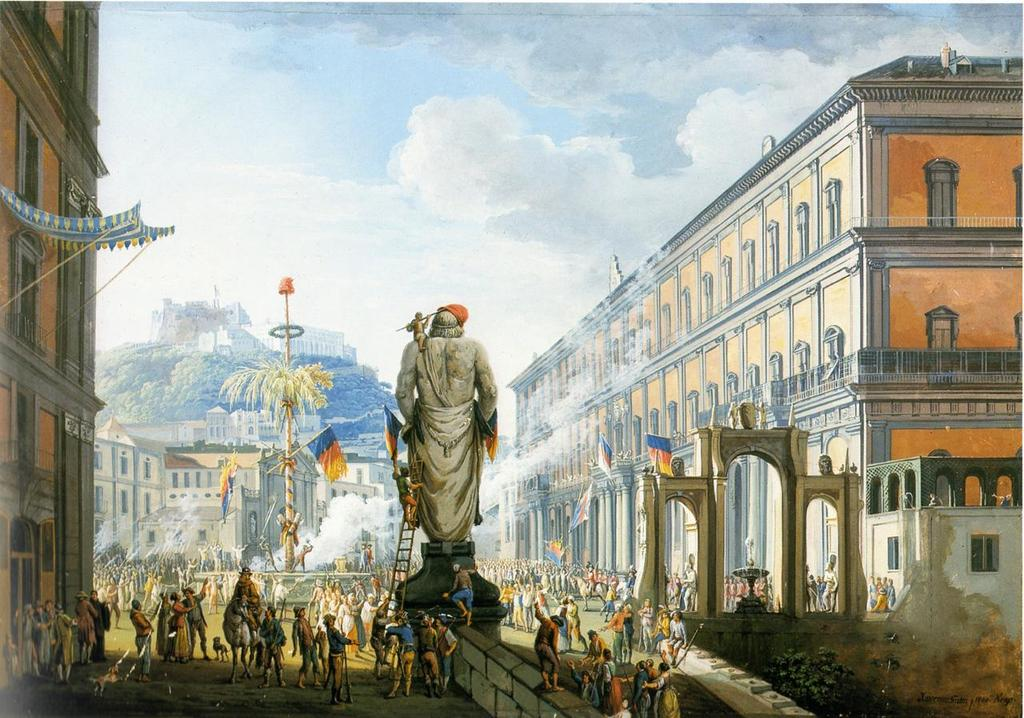
Painting of the Revolution of 1799 with blue-yellow-red tricolours

On 10 July 1799, King Ferdinand entered the Bay of Naples on a Neapolitan frigate, the Sirena. At four o'clock that afternoon, he went aboard the British Foudroyant, which was to be his headquarters for the next four weeks.

Of some 8,000 political prisoners, 99 were executed, including Prince Gennaro Serra, who was publicly beheaded, the intellectual Mario Pagano, who had written the republican constitution; the scientist, Domenico Cirillo; Luisa Sanfelice; Gabriele Manthoné, the minister of war under the republic; Massa, the defender of Castel dell'Ovo; Ettore Carafa, the defender of Pescara, who had been captured by treachery; and Eleonora Fonseca Pimentel, court-poet turned revolutionary and editor of il Monitore Napoletano, the newspaper of the republican government. More than 500 other people were imprisoned (222 for life), 288 were deported and 67 exiled. The subsequent censorship and oppression of all political movement was far more debilitating for Naples.

After news of these events arrived in Britain, Whig statesman Charles James Fox made a speech in the British House of Commons on 3 February 1800 criticising what he alleged to be Britain's acquiescence to Ferdinand's repression of Neapolitan republicans.

== Gallery ==
The flag of the Parthenopean Republic was the French tricolor with a yellow stripe in the place of the white one

Variant flag.

Variant flag with emblem.

== See also ==
- Naples Lazzaroni
- Giuseppe Abbamonte
- Altamuran Revolution
- History of Pescara
- Sister republic

== Bibliography ==
- Acton, Harold (2009) [1957]. The Bourbons of Naples (1731–1825). London: Faber and Faber. ISBN 978-0-571-24901-5.
- Davis, John (2006). Naples and Napoleon: Southern Italy and the European Revolutions, 1780–1860. Oxford University Press. ISBN 0-19-820755-7.
- Gregory, Desmond (2001). Napoleon's Italy. London: Associated University Press. ISBN 0-8386-3884-8.
- North, Jonathan (2018). Nelson at Naples, Revolution and Retribution in 1799. Stroud: Amberley. ISBN 978-1-4456-7937-2.
