= Eleonora Fonseca Pimentel =

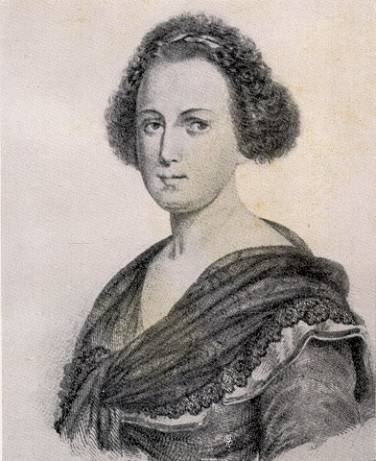
- Born: Leonor da Fonseca Pimentel Chaves; 13 January 1752; Rome, Papal States
- Died: 20 August 1799 (aged 47); Naples, Kingdom of Naples
- Occupation: Poet

Eleonora Anna Maria Felice de Fonseca Pimentel (Italian: [eleoˈnɔːra ˈanna maˈriːa feˈliːtʃe de fonˈsɛːka pimenˈtɛl]; born Leonor da Fonseca Pimentel Chaves, Portuguese: [ljuˈnoɾ ðɐ fõˈsekɐ pimẽˈtɛl ˈʃavɨʃ, lewˈ-]; 13 January 1752 – 20 August 1799) was an Italian poet, librarian, and revolutionary. As a revolutionary, she was connected with the Neapolitan revolution and subsequent short-lived Neapolitan Republic (also known as the Parthenopean Republic) of 1799, a sister republic of the French Republic and one of many set up in the 1790s in Europe.

== Early life and family ==
Pimentel was born in Rome to a Portuguese noble family. She wrote poetry, read Latin and Greek and spoke several languages (Italian, Portuguese, French and a little English). As a child, she moved with her family to Naples following political difficulties between the Papal States (of which Rome was the capital) and the Kingdom of Portugal. Her mother's death in 1771 left her with a substantial dowry, and she became engaged to her first cousin, Miguel Lopes. In 1776 the engagement broke off, and her father acquired a husband for her, Pasquale Tria de Solis, lieutenant of the Neapolitan Army, whom she married In 1778. In October of the same year, she gave birth to a son, Francesco. However, the infant died about eight months later. He was Eleonora's only child, as violence from her husband resulted in two later miscarriages. These tragedies led to the creation of several of her most notable works.

Six years later, seeing the mistreatment of his daughter and the misuse of her dowry, Pimentel's father went to court to ask for his daughter to be returned home. In 1784 the Court of Naples granted the discontinuation of Solis’ authority over Pimentel, and she was sent back to her familial home. A year later her father died, and she was left alone. In ill health due to her newfound poverty, she asked the king for a small pension, which she was granted because of her literary merits.

== Literary history ==
Pimentel's poetry was written in reformist, neoclassical style, evocative of the period of Enlightenment. Some of her works involved praise or recommended reformation of the monarchy. Pimentel became well known after winning several royal writing competitions. She secured a position as a court poet, and was subsequently appointed as royal librarian to the Queen of Naples, Maria Carolina of Austria. Her success allowed her entrance to notable Neapolitan literary societies and opened the way to her correspondence with the foremost literati of the time. Metastasio labelled her "l’amabilissima musa del Tago," or "The most amiable muse of the Tagus." Voltaire dedicated a poem to her, in which he refers to her as "Nightingale of beautiful Italy". Other prominent literary figures she kept in contact with included Gaetano Alberto, Antonio, and Ferdinando Galiani. She often translated works from foreign languages as a form of income after separating from her husband. Pimentel's commentary on these translations led to her categorization as a political author. In 1799 she created, worked as Editor-in-Chief, and wrote for Il Monitore Napoletano, the newspaper of the Neapolitan Republic named after Le Moniteur Universel in France. The paper printed thirty-five issues within its lifespan of 2 February – 8 June 1799.

== Becoming a revolutionary ==
In the 1790s, Fonseca Pimentel became involved in the Jacobin movement in Naples that was working to overthrow the monarchy and establish a local version of the French Republic. She and others who were well educated and spoke several languages (including French) came to be regarded as suspicious by the monarchy. She believed in the French revolutionary principles that were being circulated at the time of Liberty, Equality, and Fraternity. Her beliefs were secular and republican. She also believed in the importance of educating the masses. After King Ferdinand IV fled Naples, she and other Jacobins welcomed in the French army.

The launch of her newspaper turned her into a well-known political revolutionary. Il Monitore Napoletano discussed the challenges facing the new Neapolitan Republic, praised the arrival of the French army, conveyed republican themes, and criticized the Bourbon monarchy. Fonseca Pimentel was one of the leaders of the revolution that overthrew the Bourbon monarchy and installed the Parthenopean Republic in January 1799. However, as time went on she became more disillusioned with the behaviour of the French army, and began to warn the readers of her newspaper about the dangers of possible chaos and anarchy. When the Republic was overthrown and the Bourbon monarchy restored in June 1799, she was one of the revolutionaries executed by the royal tribunals implemented by the restored monarchy.

== Arrest and death ==
On 28 June a group of republicans including Fonseca Pimentel boarded ships bound for France at the fall of the Neapolitan Republic. However, before the ships could leave port, she was taken into custody. She was arrested and later sentenced to death, by hanging, on 20 August 1799. This was because of her revolutionary activities and writings against the monarchy, the worst of which was a poem written for the birth of Queen Carolina's second child, in which she refers to the queen as an “impure lesbian” and an “unfaithful imbecile tyrant.”

Fonseca Pimentel asked to be beheaded, as was customary aristocrats sentenced to death; however her request was denied. The Kingdom of Naples only recognized her father's nobility, and additionally as a Jacobin she was no longer publicly viewed as nobility. She was thusly killed by hanging, in August 1799. As a woman once viewed as noble, who had however spoken out against the monarchy, she was made an example of through her public hanging. And of eight other patriots sentenced, she was the last to be hanged. On the day of her hanging in Piazza Mercato, her last wish was only for a cup of coffee. She was calm as she went to the gallows, as the monarch's loyalists shouted: "Long Live Carolina, Death to the Jacobina." Her last words were in Latin, a quote from Virgil's The Aeneid: "Forsan et haec olim meninisse juvabit," which translates to "perhaps it will please (people) one day to remember these things."

== Notable works ==
- Il Tempio della Gloria ("the Time of Glory") (1768)
- La Nascita de Orfeo ("The Birth of Orpheus") (1775)
- Il Trionfo della Virtu ("The Triumph of Virtue") (1776)
- Sonetto Napoletano ("Neapolitan Sonnet") (c. 1788)
- Sonetti per S. Leucio ("Sonnets for S. Leucio") (1789)
- La Fuga in Egitto ("The Flight to Egypt") (1792)
- Sonetti in Morte del Suo Unico Figlio ("Sonnets for the Death of my Only Son") (1779–1784)
- Ode Elegiaca ("Elegiatic Ode") (1779–1784)

== Sources ==
- Benedetto Croce, Eleonora de Fonseca Pimentel, Roma, Tipografia Nazionale, 1887 (in Italian)
- Bice Gurgo, Eleonora Fonseca Pimentel, Napoli, Cooperativa Libreria, 1935 (in Italian)
- Maria Antonietta Macciocchi, Cara Eleonora, Milano, Rizzoli, 1993 (in Italian)
- Elena Urgnani, La Vicenda Letteraria e Politica di Eleonora de Fonseca Pimentel, Napoli, La Città del Sole, 1998 (in Italian)
- Enzo Striano, Il resto di niente. Storia di Eleonora de Fonseca Pimentel e della rivoluzione napoletana del 1799, Napoli, Avagliano 1999; Milano, Rizzoli 2001, 2004 (in Italian)
- Nico Perrone, La Loggia della Philantropia, Palermo, Sellerio, 2006 ISBN 88-389-2141-5 (in Italian)
- Maria Rosaria Pelizzari, Eleonora de Fonseca Pimentel: morire per la rivoluzione, Storia delle Donne 4/2008 - «Correrò questo rischio» Sacrificio, sfida, resistenza (in Italian)
- Constance H.D. Giglioli (1903), Naples in 1799 an account of the Revolution of 1799 and of the rise and fall of the Parthenopean Republic, London, John Murray, Albemarle Street.
