= Pizzofalcone =

Hill in Naples, Italy

- Monte di Dio
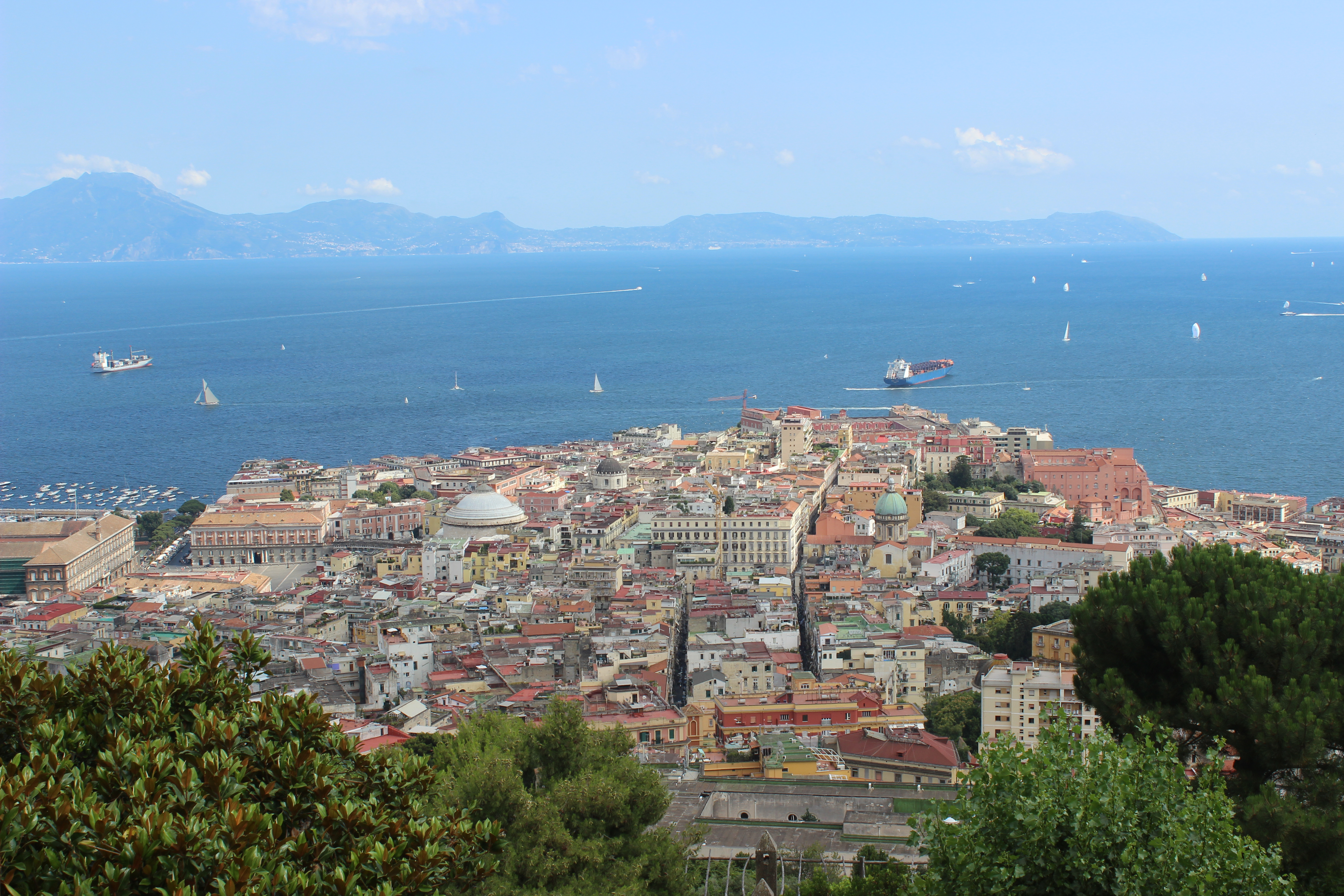
- Pizzofalcone Hill seen from the Certosa di San Martino.

Highest point
- Elevation: 60 m (200 ft)
- Coordinates: 40°49′52″N 14°14′53″E

Naming
- Etymology: "Falcon Peak"

Geography
- Location: Naples, Campania, Italy

Pizzofalcone, also known as Monte di Dio ("Mount of God"), is a hill and urban area of Naples, part of the San Ferdinando quarter. It lies between Borgo Santa Lucia, Chiatamone and Chiaia, and reaches an elevation of 60 metres.

== Etymology ==
The name Pizzofalcone dates back to the mid-13th century, when the hill was still outside the urban area. Charles I of Anjou, King of Naples, chose the site for falcon hunting and had a falconry built on the hill for the real caccia di falconi ("royal falcon hunt").

The name Monte di Dio derives from the church and adjoining convent of the same name, founded in the 16th century at the upper end of Via Monte di Dio. Both buildings no longer exist.

== History ==
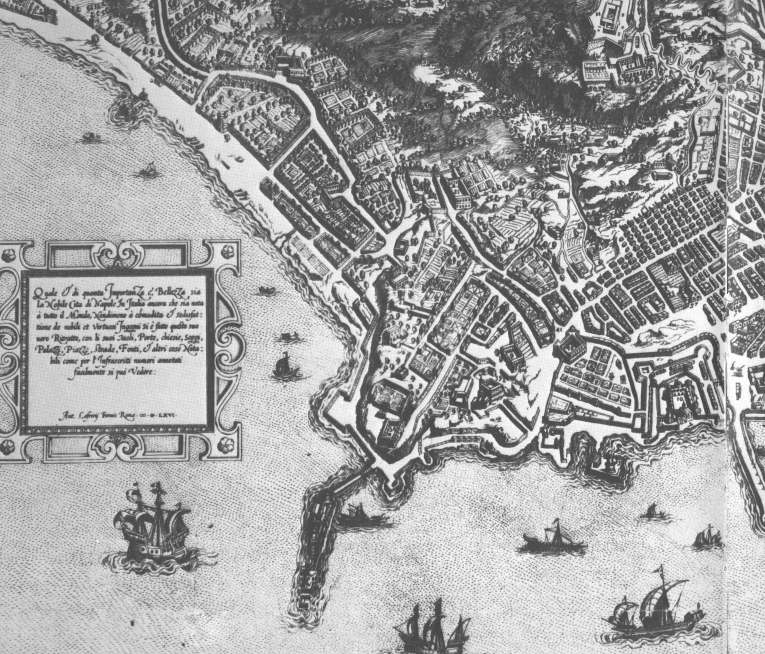
View of Naples by Antonio Lafreri, 1566

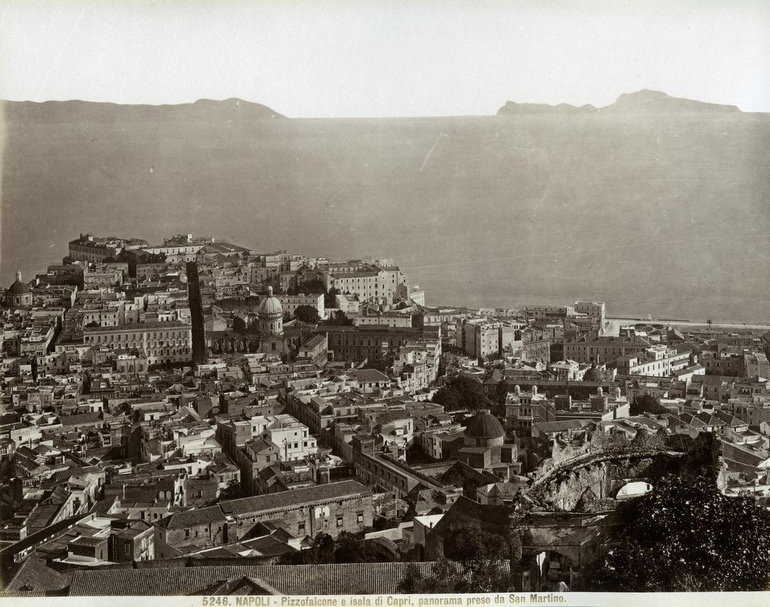
Pizzofalcone Hill and the Island of Capri, photographed from the Certosa di San Martino during the second half of the 19th century

The Cumaeans founded the settlement of Parthenope here at the end of the 8th century BC, although the earliest archaeological evidence dates to the third quarter of the 8th century BC, between 750 and 720 BC, not far in date from the earliest phases of Pithekoussai and the settlement of Cumae.

During the Roman Empire, the area formed part of the Villa of Lucullus. At the summit of the hill, within the archaeological site of Monte Echia, remains of the villa estate are still visible.

Following the fall of the Western Roman Empire, from the end of the 5th century AD Pizzofalcone was occupied by an important community of Basilian monks, who adopted the Rule of Saint Benedict during the 7th century.

In 1442, Naples was besieged by Alfonso V of Aragon. At that time Pizzofalcone lay outside the city walls. To support the siege, a bastion known as the fortelicio di Pizzofalcone was constructed and later remained as part of the city's defences.

The area's true urban development began in 1509, when Andrea Carafa della Spina, Count of Santa Severina, purchased land belonging to the Monastery of Saints Peter and Sebastian in order to build his villa. The deed of sale contains the last known reference to the fortelicio di Pizzofalcone, which was probably demolished during the expansion of the city walls. In Antonio Lafreri's view of Naples published in 1566, the area's urban layout is already clearly recognisable.

The 16th-century enlargement of the city under Pedro de Toledo, Viceroy of Naples, incorporated Monte Echia within the city walls for the first time. During the Aragonese period the hill had still served as the military stronghold known as siti Perillos, an outlying defensive position of the city.

The falconry established by Charles I of Anjou was demolished to make way for a prison, which was later converted into military barracks. During the 19th century the complex housed the Royal Guard Grenadiers. The site also accommodated the Reale Officio Topografico (Royal Topographic Office), where the topographic, geographic and hydrographic maps of the Kingdom of the Two Sicilies were produced. The building included an observatory used for astronomical observations connected with geodetic surveying.

Following the landslide of the evening of 28 January 1868, the Military Engineering Corps carried out several investigations to determine whether the disaster had been caused by faults in the construction of the retaining walls. On that occasion the engineer Alfonso Guerra prepared the first survey of the caves beneath Monte Echia, documenting the existence of underground cavities accessible from buildings along Via Santa Lucia and Via Chiatamone.

At the end of the 19th century, following the construction of Via Caracciolo and the coastal land reclamation works, the rocky spur overlooking Via Chiatamone was substantially reduced.

== Famous landmarks ==
Although relatively small in area, Pizzofalcone, in the southern part of the San Ferdinando quartiere, contains numerous sites of historical and artistic interest.

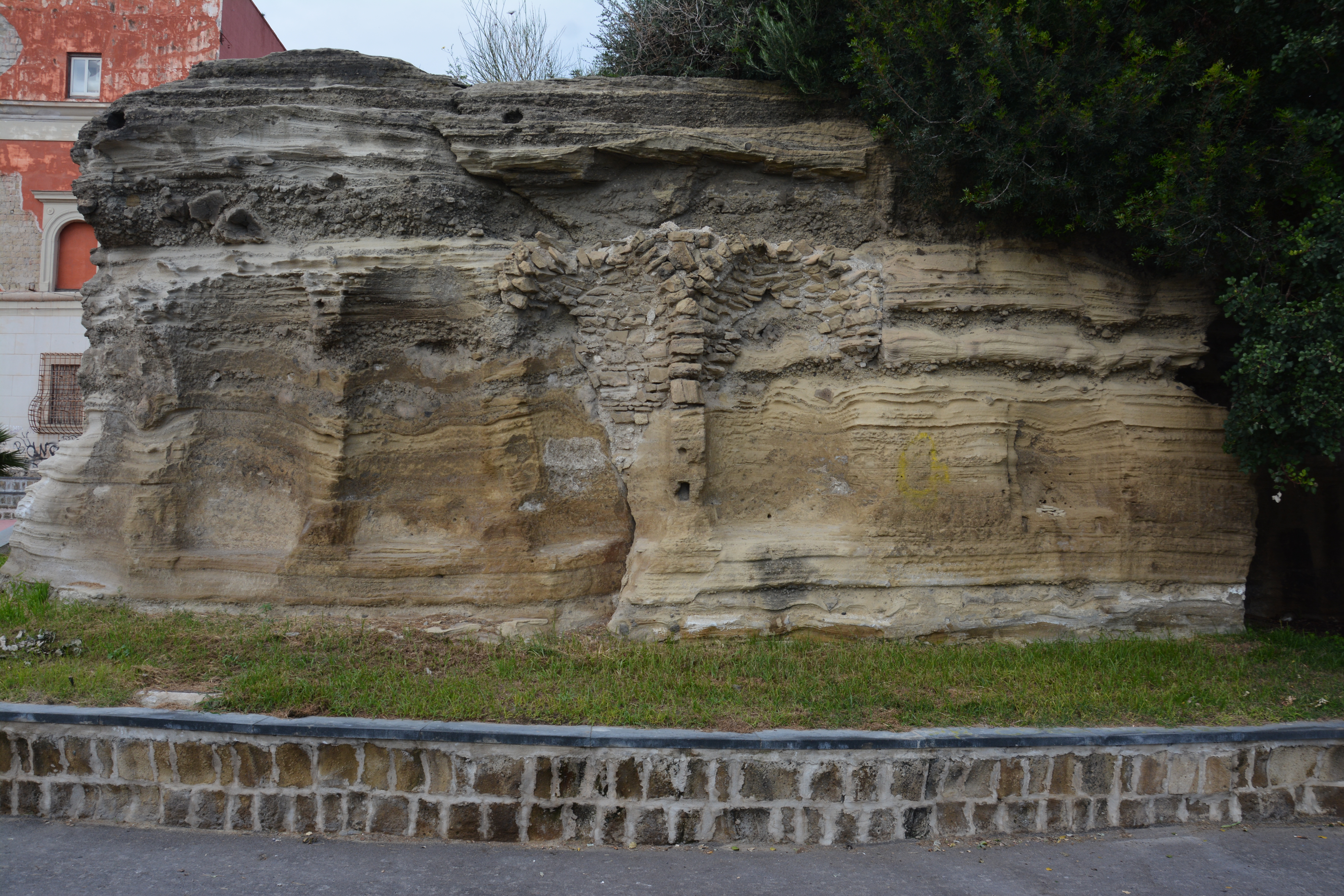
Remains of the Villa of Lucullus

At the summit of the hill lies the archaeological site of Monte Echia, with its panoramic terrace overlooking the Gulf of Naples and the remains of the Villa of Lucullus. From here it is possible to descend to Chiatamone and the adjacent Borgo Santa Lucia and Borgo Marinari via the Monte Echia Lift and the Rampe di Pizzofalcone, from which Villa Ebe, designed by the architect Lamont Young, can be seen. Also on Monte Echia stand the Palazzo Carafa di Santa Severina and the Immacolatella a Pizzofalcone church, the earliest urban buildings in the area. The main entrance to the Gran Quartiere di Pizzofalcone was formerly located here. From the end of the 19th century, the entrance to the barracks was moved to the upper end of Via Monte di Dio.

The principal access road to Monte Echia is Via Egiziaca a Pizzofalcone. This street, used to reach the barracks, was historically the area's commercial street, while the parallel Via Monte di Dio was its residential street. Much of the eastern side of Via Egiziaca was occupied by the Convent of the Egiziaca a Pizzofalcone and the Santa Maria Egiziaca a Pizzofalcone church, designed by Cosimo Fanzago. On the opposite side stands the Palazzo Serra di Cassano, whose main entrance originally faced Via Egiziaca. In 1799, however, the duke's son, Gennaro Serra, Duke of Cassano, was executed for supporting the Parthenopean Republic. Since then the principal entrance has remained permanently closed as a sign of mourning, and access has been through Via Monte di Dio. The palace is now home to the Italian Institute for Philosophical Studies.

From Via Egiziaca it is possible to descend towards Piazza del Plebiscito and the waterfront through the Pallonetto di Santa Lucia, the historic nucleus of Borgo Santa Lucia. Here are located the Santa Maria della Solitaria church and the Museo artistico industriale Filippo Palizzi, housed in the former Istituto statale d'arte Filippo Palizzi.

Parallel to Via Egiziaca is Via Monte di Dio. At the top of the street stands the Gran Quartiere di Pizzofalcone. Today, the barracks, dedicated to Nino Bixio, house a Mobile Unit of the Polizia di Stato. The street takes its name from the Church of Monte di Dio, which stood on the site of the present entrance to the barracks until the 19th century. On the western side of the street, in Largo Generale Parisi, is the Nunziatella Military School, one of the oldest military academies in the world. The complex also includes the Nunziatella Church, built in 1588 and remodelled in 1736 by the architect Ferdinando Sanfelice. Nearby stands the Palazzo Pacanowski, constructed in the early 1960s and now used as a campus of the Parthenope University of Naples.

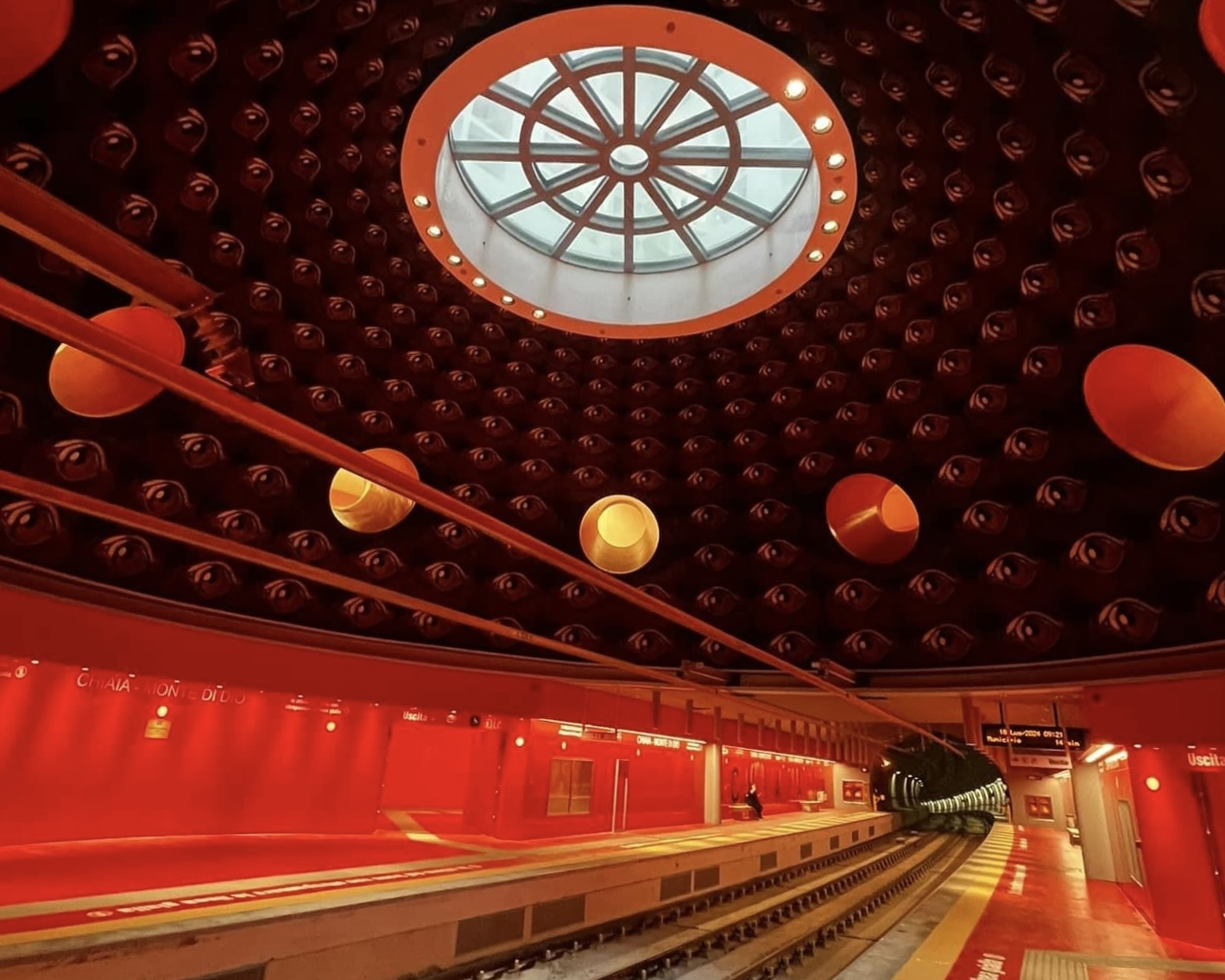
Platform level of Chiaia–Monte di Dio station

Proceeding down Via Monte di Dio are numerous historic palaces dating from the 17th and 18th centuries, including the already mentioned Palazzo Serra di Cassano and the Politeama Theatre, before reaching Piazza Santa Maria degli Angeli. The square is currently occupied by the construction works for Chiaia–Monte di Dio station on Line 6 of the Naples Metro. Overlooking the square are the Basilica of Santa Maria degli Angeli a Pizzofalcone and the Palazzo Ciccarelli di Cesavolpe, which houses the headquarters of the 1st Municipality of the City of Naples. Adjacent to the square is the Ponte di Chiaia, which provides a road connection with the San Carlo alle Mortelle area and, by means of a lift, a pedestrian connection with Via Chiaia.

From the square, Via Gennaro Serra leads to Piazza del Plebiscito. Along this street is the entrance to the Bourbon Tunnel, commissioned by Ferdinand II of the Two Sicilies as an escape route to the sea in the event of popular uprisings.

== Transport ==
- Monte Echia Lift
- Chiaia Funicular
- Naples Metro Line 6, Chiaia station
- Urban buses

== Bibliography ==
- Ferraro, Italo. Napoli atlante della città storica, vol. VII. Naples: Oikos, 2010.

== See also ==
- Santa Maria Egiziaca a Pizzofalcone
- The Bastards of Pizzofalcone (TV series)
- Parthenope (ancient city)
- Monte Echia
