= Monte Echia =

Rocky promontory in Naples, Italy

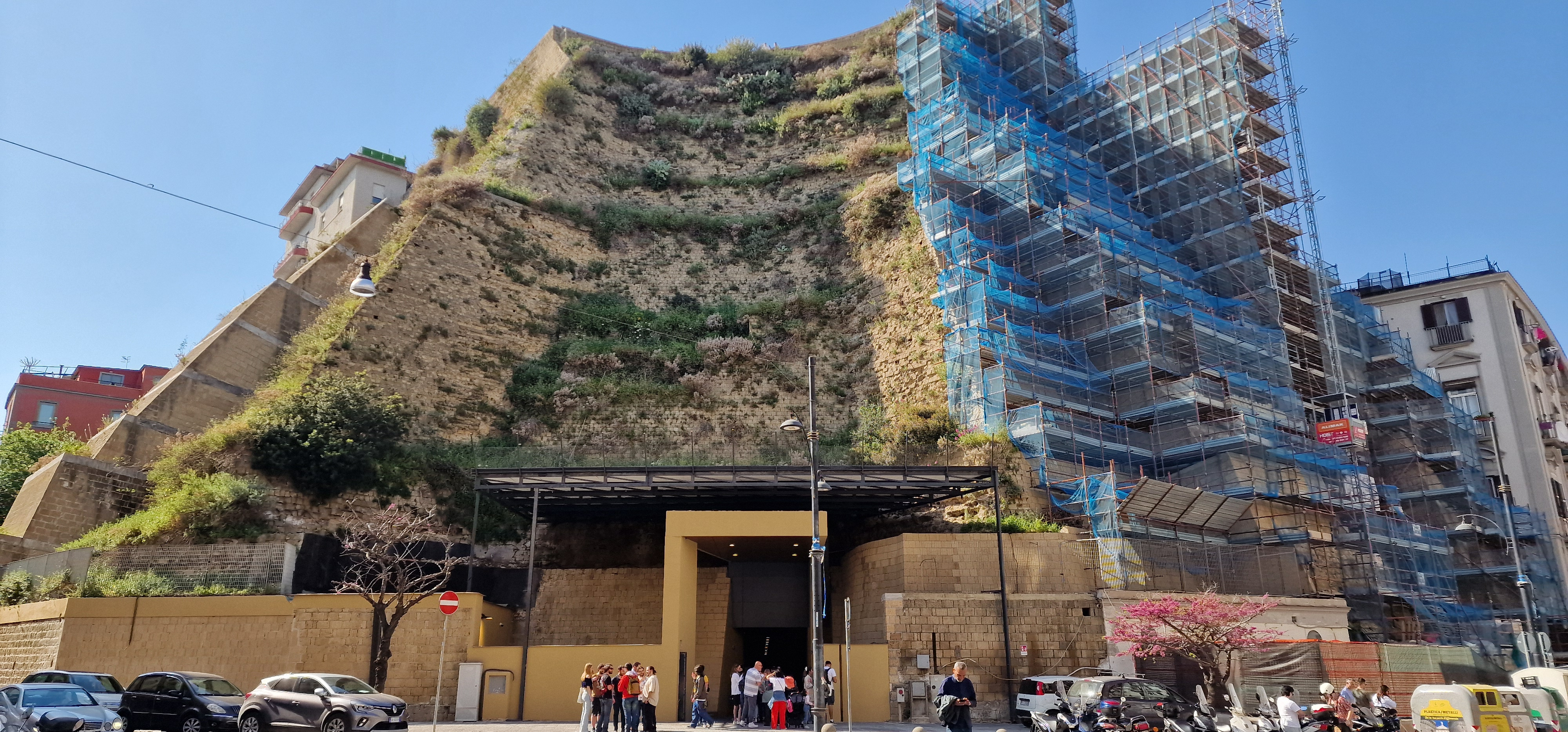
- Monte Echia seen from via Santa Lucia

Highest point
- Coordinates: 40.8341°N 14.2468°E

Geography
- Country: Italy
- Region: Campania
- Parent range: Pizzofalcone

Monte Echia is a rocky promontory, entirely made of yellow tuff, located in the Pizzofalcone area, in the San Ferdinando district of Naples.

This promontory projects into the Gulf of Naples between the Borgo Santa Lucia to the east, the Chiaia basin to the west, and overlooks the Megaride islet to the south.

On it, the Cumaeans founded Parthenope at the end of the 8th century BC, although the earliest archaeological evidence dates to the third quarter of the 8th century, that is, between 750 and 720 BC, not far from the earliest phases of Pithecusa and the settlement of Cumae.

== Etymology ==
The promontory was anciently called Euple or Emple by Euplea of Statius. Subsequently, the name slowly transformed into Epla, Hecle, Ecla, Echa, and finally became the current Echia. Some scholars instead believe it derives from Hercli, perhaps from Heracles (Euple being then part of Magna Grecia), others from the name of a nymph Egle.

== History ==
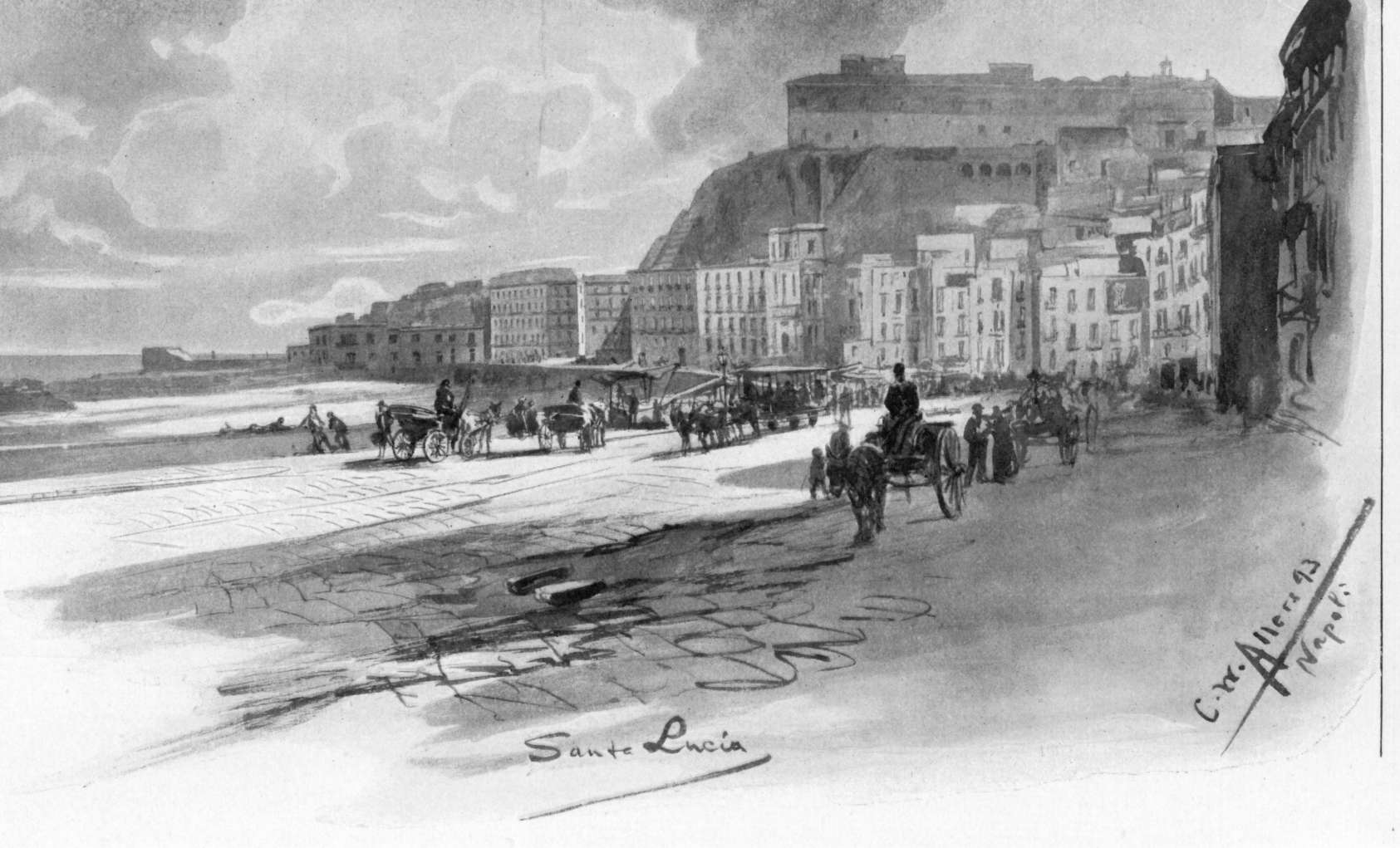
View of Monte Echia from the Santa Lucia borough in a late 19th-century print

Parthenope was connected to the beach and the port by a single access route.

Incorporated into the castrum lucullanum (villa of Lucullus that extended to the Megaride islet) in Imperial times, it hosted the famous Lucullian gardens, filled with exotic plants and rare bird species. The ancient name of the mount, Platamon (surviving in the toponym of the street running at its base, via Chiatamone), means "cliff hollowed by caves". Indeed, numerous cavities open within Monte Echia, which Neapolitan antiquarian tradition believed were inhabited from prehistory to the classical era. They later became sites of Mithraic rites, of cenobites in the Middle Ages, and of orgies in the 16th century. The latter caused great scandal, prompting viceroy Pedro de Toledo to order their closure.

== Monuments and Places of Interest ==
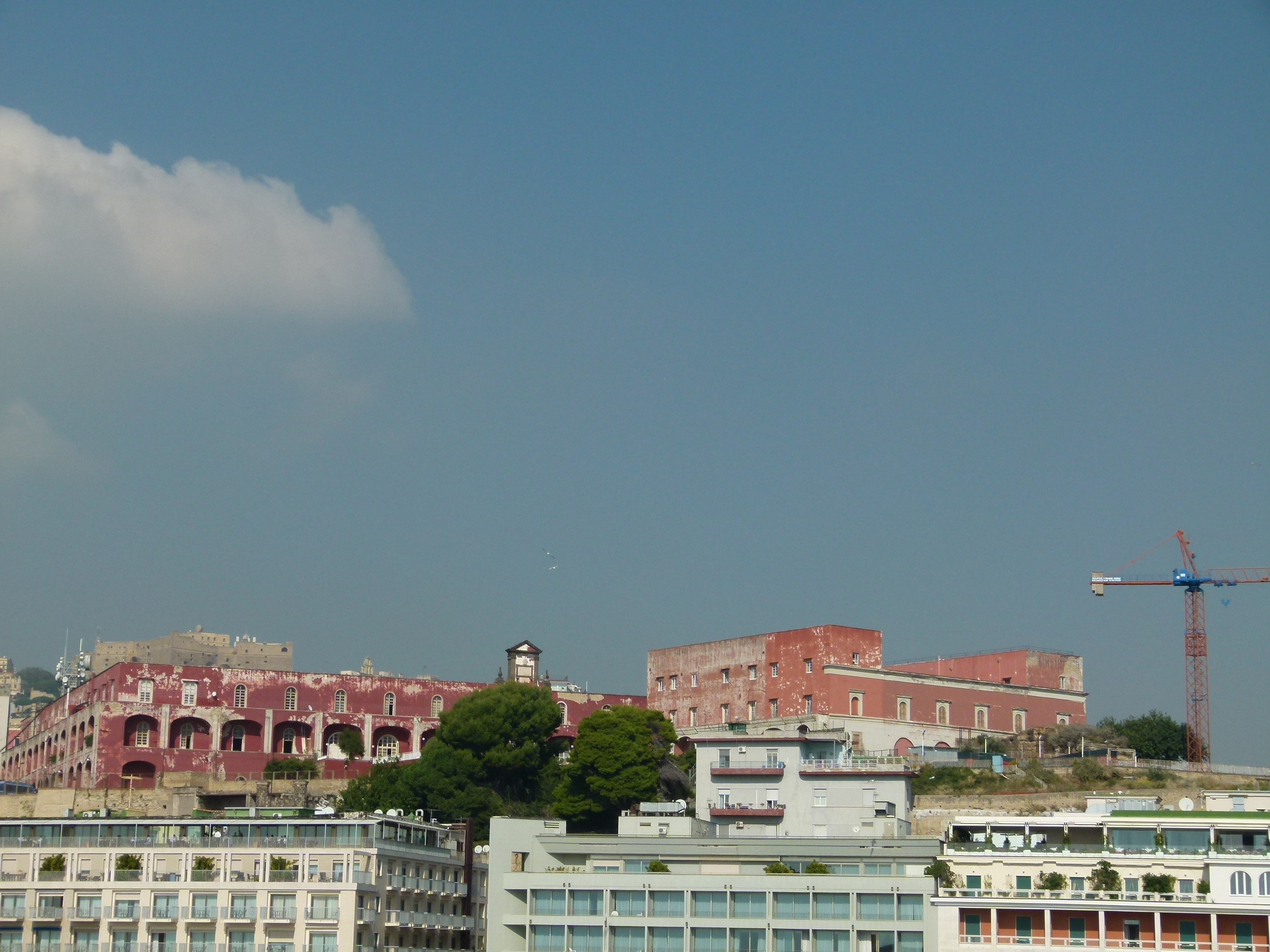
The Monte Echia belvedere with the Gran Quartiere di Pizzofalcone on the left and the Palazzo Carafa di Santa Severina on the right.

The archaeological site of Monte Echia is characterized by some remains of the Villa of Lucullus. Next to the villa lies a splendid belvedere that offers one of the most beautiful and characteristic views of Naples and its Gulf. The horizon spans 360° from the Capodimonte Hill to the north, to Vesuvius to the east, to the Sorrentine Peninsula and Capri to the south, to Posillipo to the west. The belvedere has recently undergone restoration. As part of the works, the Monte Echia Elevator was inaugurated in 2024, enabling quick access to the underlying Borgo Santa Lucia and Borgo Marinari. The old connection consisted of the Pizzofalcone ramps, along which one can seeVilla Ebe, a work by the Neapolitan architect of Scottish origin, Lamont Young.

Behind the belvedere, in the eastern part of Monte Echia, stand the Palazzo Carafa di Santa Severina and the Chiesa dell’Immacolatella a Pizzofalcone, the first urban settlements in the area, dating to the early 16th century. The other building, on the southwestern side, is the Gran Quartiere di Pizzofalcone, now the Ninio Bixio police barracks, built during the Spanish era concurrently with the militarization of the Pizzofalcone hill.

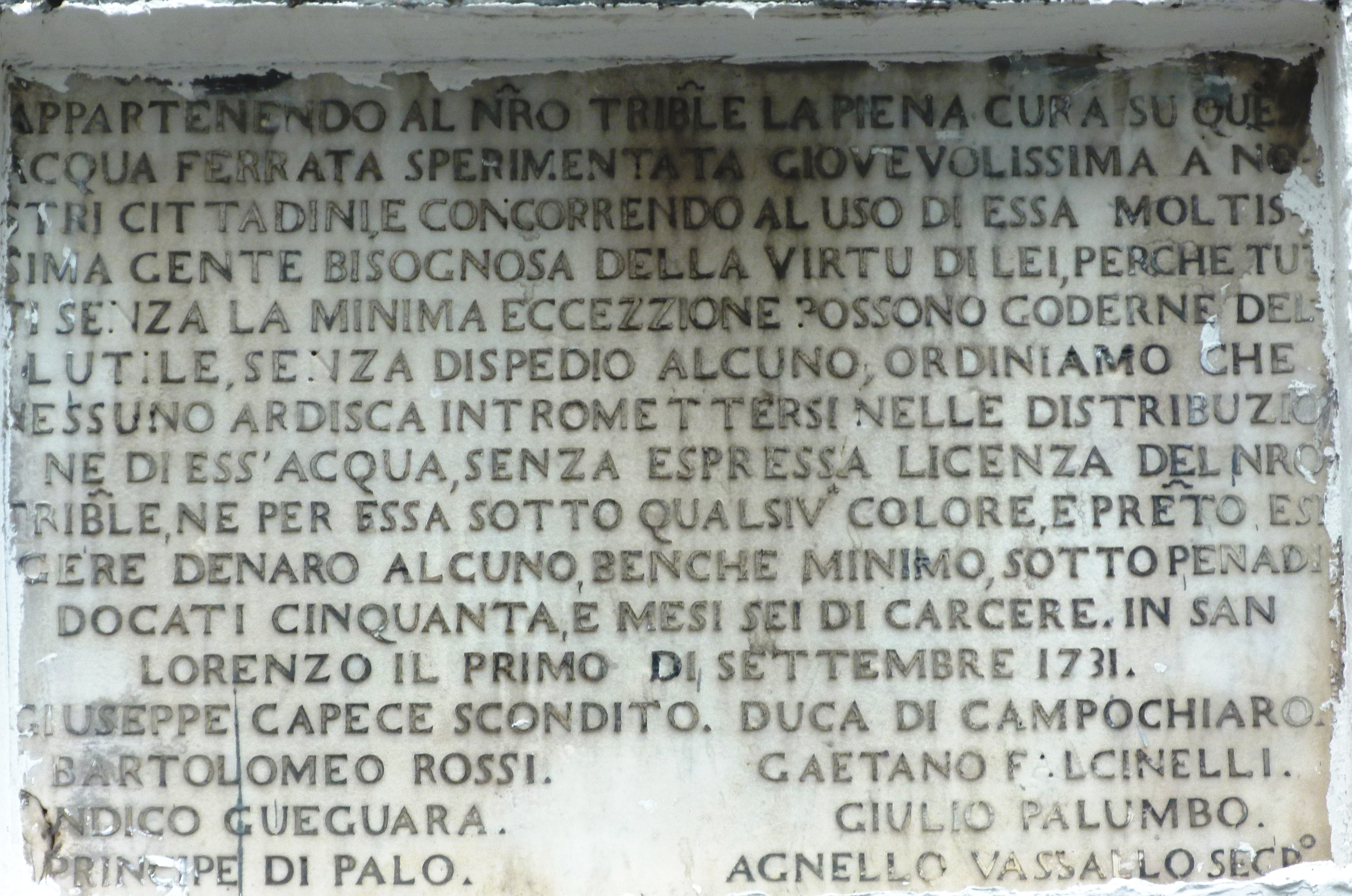
Plaque of the 1731 edict donating the ferruginous water spring to the people – via Chiatamone

From this mount originated the source of a bicarbonate-alkaline-ferruginous water of volcanic origin, known to past Neapolitans as acqua zuffregna or acqua ferrata.

From the name of the small amphorae (the mummarelle) used to collect and sell it at city stalls, this water was also called acqua di mummare.

The spring was closed in the early 1970s due to fears of contamination during the cholera epidemic, then returned to Neapolitans after 27 years and numerous checks through four dedicated fountains located in via Riccardo Filangieri di Candida Gonzaga, the ancient park road of the castle, near Royal Palace. In 2003, after only three years, these fountains were closed again and today are in a state of complete degradation and abandonment. Another fountain from the same source, donated in 1731 to the people of the Borgo Santa Lucia, in via Chiatamone, is still walled up.

== See also ==
- San Ferdinando (Naples)
- Archaeological sites in Naples
- Parthenope (siren)

== Bibliography ==
- Italo Ferraro (2010). Napoli atlante della città storica [Naples Atlas of the Historic City] (in Italian). Vol. VII. Naples: Oikos.
