= Palazzo Serra di Cassano =

Coordinates: 40.8335°N 14.2458°E

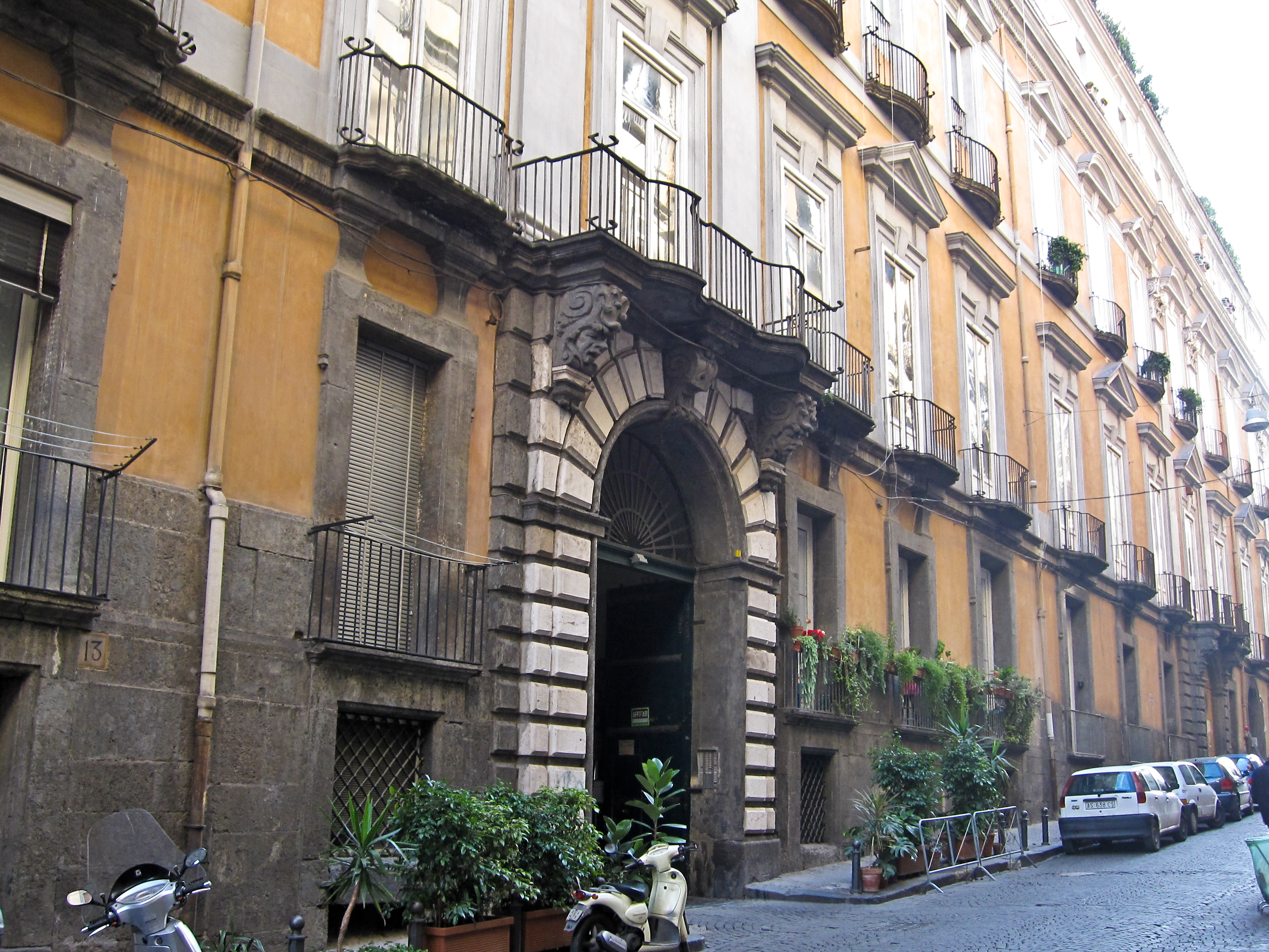
Facade of the Palazzo Serra di Cassano in Naples

Palazzo Serra di Cassano is an aristocratic palace in Naples, Italy, built for the wealthy Serra family, one of the 54 families of the 'old nobility' of Genoa, whose family was part of an albergo. The family insignia (crest) is frescoed on the ceiling of its Great Hall. The family had economic interests in banking, insurance and law.

== History ==
The Palazzo is behind the Piazza del Plebiscito via Monte di Dio, the road leading up to the height of the Pizzofalcone peak. It was built in 1730 by the architect Ferdinando Sanfelice, who was also responsible for the construction of the nearby Nunziatella, a military academy founded in the days of the Kingdom of Naples that is still in operation.

Both the Duke of Cassano and the Palazzo Serra were known throughout Europe for their superb library. In the 19th century, that collection was sold to George Spencer, 2nd Earl Spencer; the part which he retained is located today at the John Rylands Library, Manchester. The dual portals of the palace entrance, on the via Monte di Dio, open onto twin curved stairways leading up over an octagonal courtyard. The building originally had entrances on two different streets; the entrance that formerly opened onto via Egiziaca, facing the Royal Palace, was closed in 1799. The owner, Luigi Francesco Serra, duke of Cassano (Calabria), closed it to protest the beheading of his son Gennaro Serra. Gennaro, the prince of Cassano, fought for the Neapolitan Republic, and was handed over to Bourbon authorities by Admiral Horatio Nelson, who betrayed an agreement he had made with the revolutionaries.

Gennaro Serra's mother Giulia Carafa was also suspected in the revolutionary plot and was banished from Naples for seven years.

The building today houses the Istituto Italiano per gli Studi Filosofici (Italian Institute for Philosophical Studies).
