= History of Naples =

Historical affiliations

Parthenope 8th century–507 BC
Neapolis 507–326 BC
Neapolis 326–89 BC
∟ ally of Roman Republic
Roman Republic 199–89 BC
∟ municipium of Neapolis
Roman Republic 89–27 BC
Roman Empire 27 BCE–395 AD
Western Roman Empire 395–476
Kingdom of Italy 476–493
Ostrogothic Kingdom 493–535
Eastern Roman Empire 535–661
Eastern Roman Empire 661–763
∟ Duchy of Naples 661–763
Duchy of Naples 763–840
∟ client state of the Eastern Roman Empire
Duchy of Naples 840–1137
Kingdom of Sicily 1137–1194
Kingdom of Sicily 1194–1254
∟ personal union with the Holy Roman Empire
Kingdom of Sicily 1254–1282
Kingdom of Naples 1282–1442
Crown of Aragon 1442–1458
∟ Kingdom of Naples
Kingdom of Naples 1458–1501
Kingdom of Naples 1501–1504
∟ personal union with the Kingdom of France
Kingdom of Naples 1504–1647
∟ Spanish viceroyalty
Most Serene Republic of this Kingdom of Naples 1647–1648 ∟ protectorate of the Kingdom of France
Kingdom of Naples 1648–1714
∟ Spanish viceroyalty
Kingdom of Naples 1714–1734
∟ ruled by Austrian monarchy
Kingdom of Naples 1734–1799
Parthenopean Republic 1799
∟ client state of the French First Republic
Kingdom of Naples 1799–1806
Kingdom of Naples 1806–1815
∟ client state of the First French Empire
Kingdom of Naples 1815–1816
Kingdom of the Two Sicilies 1816–1861
Kingdom of Italy 1861–1946
Italian Republic 1946–present

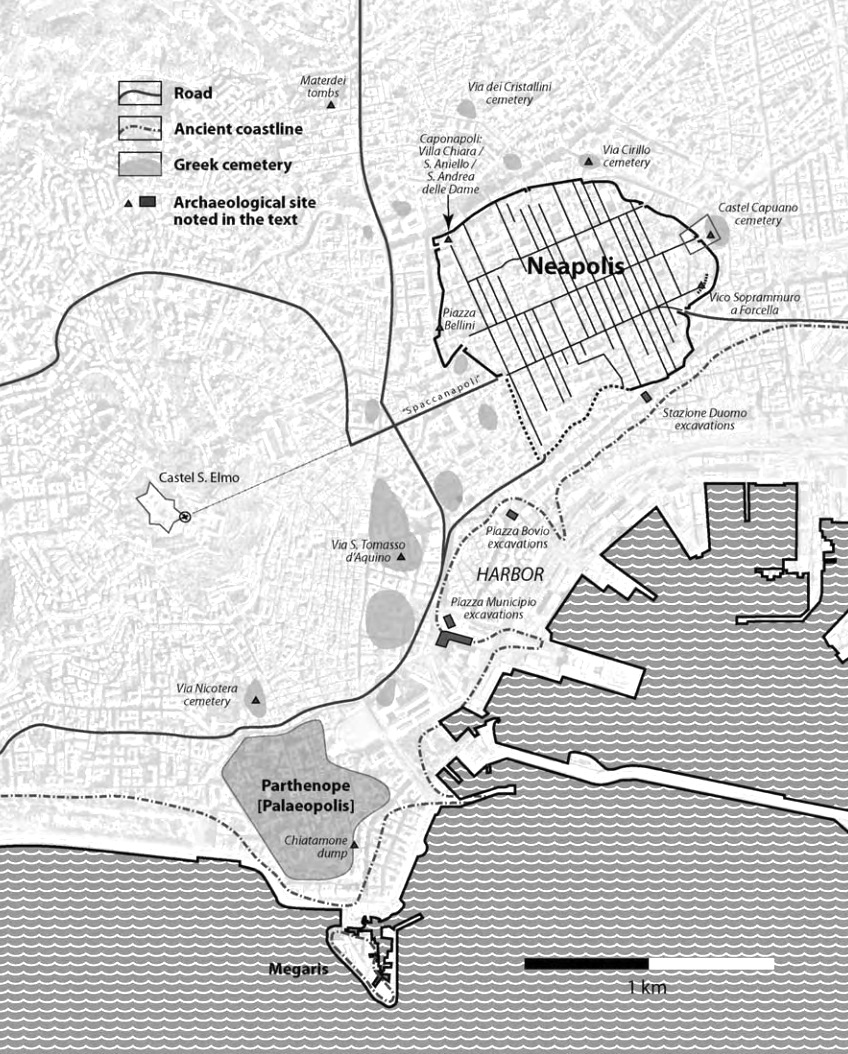
Map of Parthenope (Palaeopolis) and Neapolis

The history of Naples is long and varied, dating to Greek settlements established in the Naples area in the 2nd millennium BC. During the end of the Greek Dark Ages a larger mainland colony – initially known as Parthenope – developed on the Pizzofalcone hill in the 8th century BC, and was refounded as Neapolis in the 6th century BC: it held an important role in Magna Graecia. The Greek culture of Naples was important to later Roman society. When the city became part of the Roman Republic in the central province of the Empire, it was a major cultural centre.

It served as the capital of the Duchy of Naples (661–1139), of the Kingdom of Sicily, of the Kingdom of Naples (1282–1816) and finally of the Two Sicilies until the unification of Italy in 1861. The city has seen the rise and fall of several civilisations and cultures, each of which has left traces in its art and architecture, and during the Renaissance and the Enlightenment was a major centre of culture. It was also a capital of the Baroque, beginning with the artist Caravaggio's career in the 17th century, and the artistic revolution he inspired.

During the Neapolitan War, the city rebelled against the Bourbon monarchs, spurring the early push towards Italian unification.

Today, Naples is part of the Italian Republic, the third largest municipality (central area) by population after Rome and Milan, and has the second or third largest metropolitan area of Italy.

== Origins ==
The earliest traces of human habitation date back to the Middle Neolithic period, as evidenced by traces of the Serra d'Alto culture found near the Santa Maria degli Angeli a Pizzofalcone basilica. Traces dating back to the Chalcolithic and Early/Middle Bronze Age were also found in the same area.

The Gaudo culture can be observed in the Eneolithic tombs of Materdei.

Discoveries of ceramics in the vicinity of Pizzofalcone hill, adjacent to the Port of Naples and dating from the late Bronze Age to the early Iron Age, suggest the presence of a site engaged in coastal activities, likely of a productive nature.

In the second millennium BC, a first Mycenaean settlement arose not far from the geographical position of the future city of Parthenope.

== Classical antiquity ==
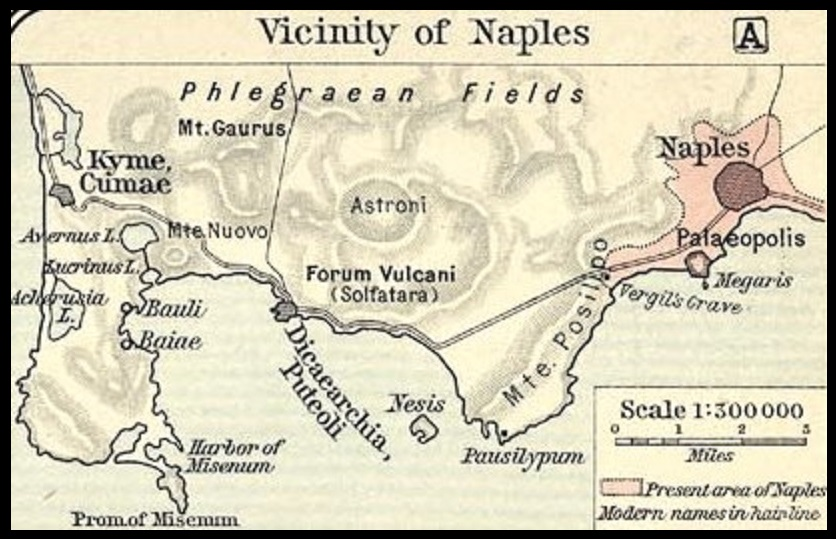
Ancient Sites in the vicinity of Naples

=== Parthenope ===
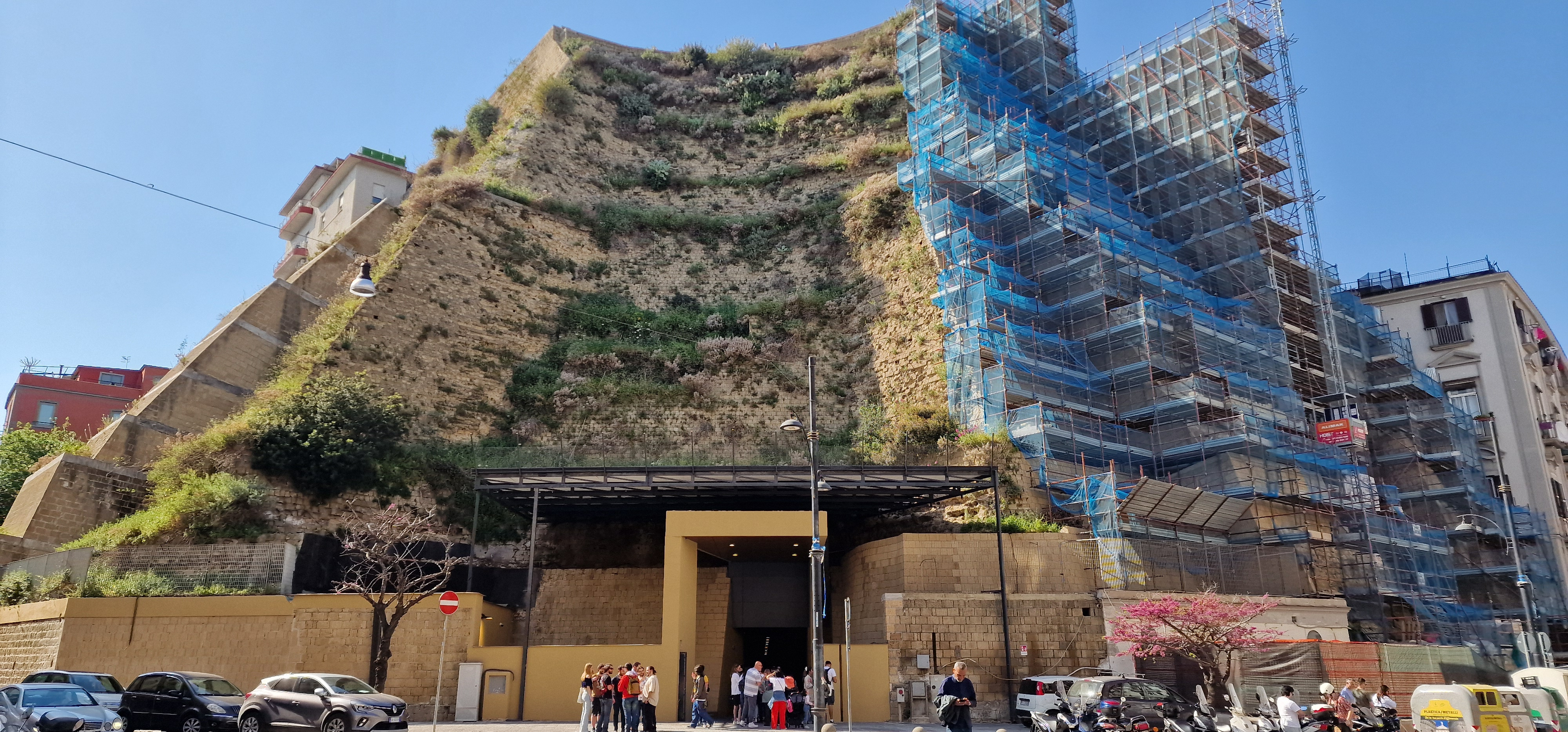
Walls of Parthenope – Monte Echia

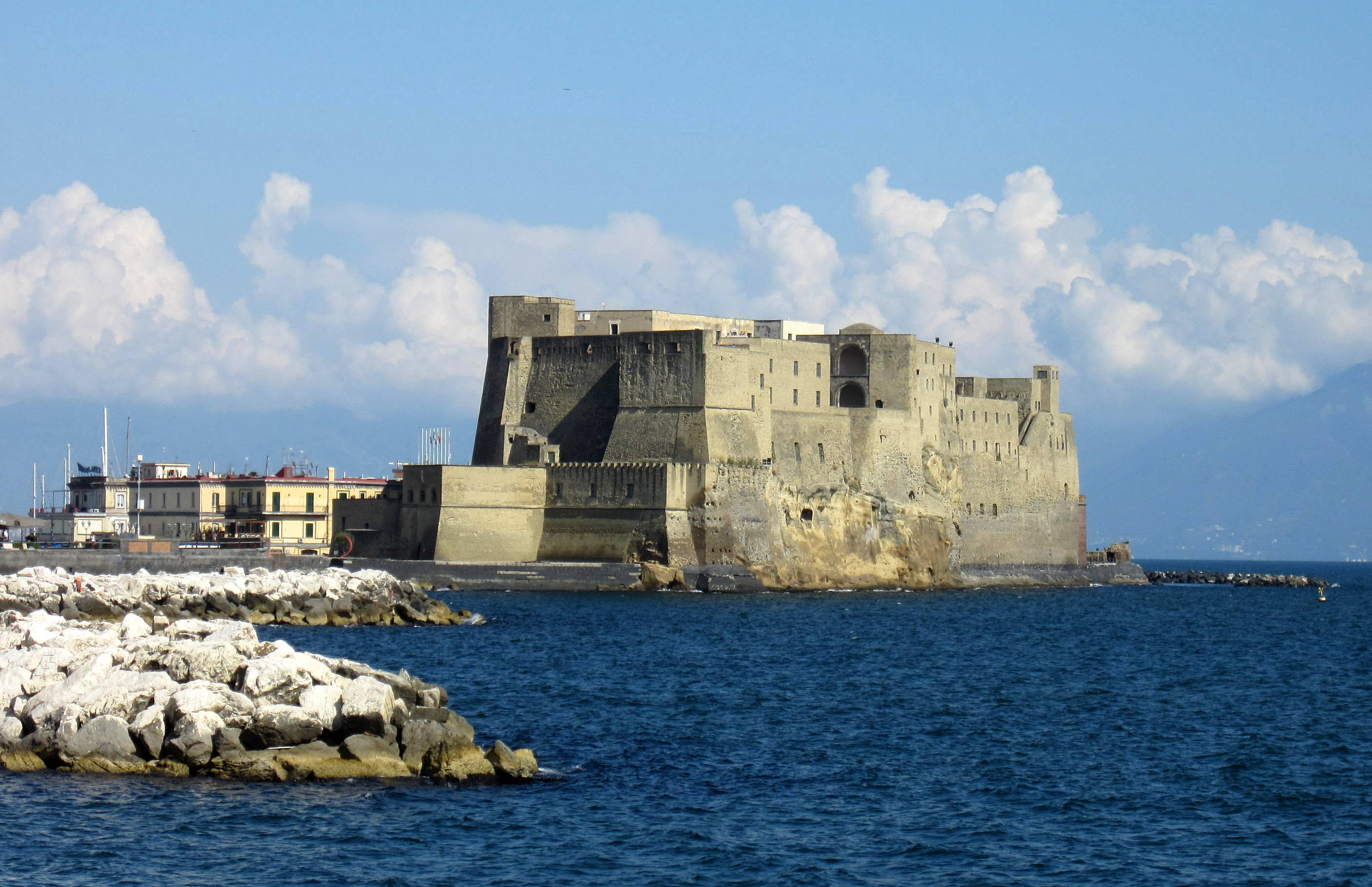
Megaride with the Castel dell'Ovo

The city of Parthenope was founded by Cumae, the earliest Greek city on mainland Italy, at the end of the 8th century BC. Parthenope was named after the siren in Greek mythology, said to have washed ashore at Megaride, having thrown herself into the sea after she failed to bewitch Ulysses with her song. The settlement was built on the Pizzofalcone promontory allowing control of sea traffic in the area.

Little archaeology for Parthenope has come to light, but a necropolis of the 7th century BC was discovered in via Nicotera. A ceramics waste dump dated to the Archaic Age was discovered in via Chiatamone where it had slid from the hill of Pizzofalcone. A tuff wall of the 6th c. BC was found in via S. Giacomo, near the town hall, which was a part of the port and may have had both boundary and defensive purposes.

When the colony began to be more frequented due to the abundance and amenity of the places, the Cumaens, worried that their city would be abandoned, decided to «destroy» it.

=== The refoundation as Neapolis ===
Neapolis (New City) was founded by the Cumaen aristocracy expelled by the tyrant Aristodemus after the victory of Aricia in 507 BC.

The oligarchs decided to establish Neapolis as a "second Cumae", similar to the city from which they came; for example, the continuation of cults such as that of Demeter and the faithful resumption of the organisation in phrenias confirm this. This chronology is confirmed by archaeological finds.

The original center of Parthenope on the Pizzofalcone hill was simply called Palaipolis (Latin: Palaepolis ), the "old city", and survived as a second peripheral pole of Neapolis.

The new city complex was designed on a rectangular grid of streets. It was built on a plateau sloping from north to south which allowed space for a new city. Swamps made routes to the hinterland difficult and prevented its possession of extensive agricultural lands (ager) that most of Campania benefitted from, and made Neapolis focus on the sea and trade for its livelihood.

The city eventually became one of the foremost cities of Magna Graecia and long retained its Greek culture even after defeat by the Romans.

Neapolis had an acropolis (area of Sant'Aniello in Caponapoli), agora (area of Piazza San Gaetano ) and necropolis (various examples remain, the most famous of which is the necropolis of Castel Capuano). It also eventually had strong walls (5th century), an odeon, a theatre and the temple of the city's patron gods, the Dioscuri.

=== Athenian and Syracusan influence ===
Neapolis was soon able to replace Cumae in maritime trade and to take control of the stretch of sea from the Cumaean gulf to the Neapolitan gulf. Its commercial success was made possible thanks to the decline of the tyranny of the Deinomenids in Syracuse (466 BC) and the abandonment of Pithecusae (Ischia) by the Syracusan garrison, due to a violent earthquake (or more likely a volcanic eruption of Mount Epomeo). The immediate occupation of Ischia by Neapolis indicates the tensions between the city and the Syracusans.

The Athenians soon created a network of commercial relations in the Tyrrhenian sea. Their interest in Campania, but also in Sicily and the Adriatic, was due to the need for foodstuffs especially cereals to satisfy the needs of an increasing population. The results of the Attic presence in the city were numerous: the great development in the port area and even closer ties with centres located in flat areas suitable for the cultivation of wheat (Alifae, Capua, Nola, Cumae, Dicearchia).

One obstacle stood between Athens and the thriving Campanian market: the Syracusan attempts to dominate the Tyrrhenian Sea even after the end of tyrants. In 413 BC the Athenian expedition against Syracuse in the Peloponnesian War ended in disaster and together with the plague, which substantially undermined the economy of Attica, relations between Neapolis and Athens underwent an attenuation.

=== The Samnites ===
At the end of the 5th century BC the political and social equilibrium of Neapolis was severely threatened by the Samnites, an Oscan-speaking tribe expanding towards the more fertile plains.

In 423 BC Capua, the great Etruscan stronghold-granary, was conquered by the Samnites and the original Oscan-speaking citizens were given more freedom. In 421 BC Cumae also had to capitulate after a heavy and bloody siege. Many of its fleeing inhabitants found refuge within the walls of Neapolis who thus paid their debt of gratitude to the founders. Neapolis managed to safeguard its own safety and political sovereignty by admitting the Oscan elites to the main public offices of the city. However, due to this behaviour, Neapolis profoundly damaged its relations with Cumae.

In the second half of the 4th century, during the First Samnite War, Neapolis made an alliance with the Samnites against Rome, which had already taken Capua.

In 327 the Second Samnite War resulted from tensions which arose from Roman actions in Campania and partly from actions by Neapolis. Although Livy's history may be biased, he said that Neapolis attacked Romans who lived in Campania and, after Rome's request for redress was rebuffed, it declared war and the two consular armies headed for Campania.

In 326, after having devastated the Ager Campanus, the Roman army led by the consul Publilius Philo marched on the city and besieged it. In the meantime, about four thousand Samnites and Nolan soldiers had arrived to defend Neapolis. The Romans set up camp between the old and new cities and after a year long siege, betrayal by the Greek citizens led surrender to the Romans. However, Rome left the city with wide autonomy and allowed its customs, its language and its traditions of Greek origin to survive, preferring rather to make a sort of solidarity pact and thus creating what was called foedus Neapolitanum with particular attention to its already strong and important maritime role.

=== Roman era ===
In 280 BC, after the battle of Eraclea, when Pyrrhus realised that there was no possibility of an agreement with the Romans, he counter-attacked, advancing his army towards the north. He diverted to Neapolis with the intent of capturing it or inducing it to rebel against Rome. The failed attempt wasted time to the advantage of the Romans; when he reached Capua, he found it already garrisoned.

In 211 BC, during the Second Punic War, Capua was severely punished by the Romans due to its alliance with Hannibal, and its domination of Campania waned in favour of Neapolis.

From 199 BC its role as a maritime power began to diminish to the advantage of its nearby competitor Puteoli. The promotion of Neapolis to a Roman municipium meant the loss of part of its autonomy, although the administration of Greek tradition still remained in force.

Neapolis sided with Marius in the civil war of 82 BC, and was consequently devastated by the armies of his opponent Sulla. The war deprived Neapolis of its fleet and of the island of Ischia, and compromised its trade to the advantage of Puteoli. However, the city continued to function as a regional port, as evidenced by the abundant archaeological finds in Piazza del Municipio.

Then in 50 BC the city supported Pompey in the Civil war with Julius Caesar. Having again chosen the losing side the city declined economically. Misenum became the major naval base on the Tyrrhenian Sea and even Baiae was a strong competitor for tourism and thermal bathing.

Under Augustus, the city began to recover and became a flourishing centre of Hellenistic culture that attracted Romans seeking to perfect their knowledge of Greek culture. The Neapolitan Isolympic Games (Italika Romaia Sebasta Isolympia), or Sebasta' were initiated by Augustus in 2 AD, and personally attended in 14 AD, as an equivalent to those at Olympia and became one of the most important games events in the west. The Ancient Olympic Games were part of a collection of four athletic events held in Ancient Greece as the Panhellenic Games, with the origin of the Olympic Games, the oldest of the four, said to have begun in 776 BC. These athletic events occurred in conjunction with the Panathenaic Games, which were held in Athens, Greece and began in 566 BC and continued until the 3rd century AD. In the Roman-occupied Greek city of Patras, the Caesarea Games were the newest competition venue, having started approximately 80 AD and 90 AD during the reign of Emperor Domitian.

As Italian archaeologist Amedeo Maiuri said:

Naples was the only city of the Western Roman world to host games in honour of Augustus. This was not so much due to the Emperor's personal influence or for any political agenda, but rather to the city's Greek culture. In fact, during the general decline of Hellenism in Magna Graecia and Sicily, Neapolis was still using the Greek language, institutions, cults, rites and customs. As such Neapolis could be considered the metropolis of Western Hellenism during the first period of the Roman Empire.

According to a Naples website, the games continued for several centuries, as evidenced by the names recorded on the portico and temple associated with the games, revealed by modern construction excavations. While the source cites that athletic winners received a wheat-stalk wreath, monetary prizes were awarded for musical and theatrical performances. Athletic events included stadium races, pentathlon, wrestling, boxing, pancratium, and acrobatics. Music and theatrical events included flute, kithara, poetry, comedy, tragedy, and pantomime.

The pleasant climate made it a renowned resort, as recounted by Virgil and manifested in the numerous luxurious villas that lined the coast from the Gulf of Pozzuoli to the Sorrentine peninsula. Lucullus built a vast villa estate here covering large parts of what would become the later city. The famous district of Posillipo takes its name from the ruins of Villa Pausílypon, meaning, in Greek, "a pause, or respite, from worry". Romans connected the city to the rest of Italy with their famous roads, excavated galleries to link Naples to Pozzuoli, enlarged the port, and added public baths and aqueducts to improve the quality of life in Naples. The city was also celebrated for its many feasts and spectacles.

Further set-backs occurred with the earthquakes of 62 and 64 AD and the eruption of Vesuvius in 79.

According to legend, the saints Peter and Paul came to the city to preach. Christians had a prominent role in the late years of the Roman Empire, and there are several notable catacombs, especially in the northern part of the city. The first palæo-Christian basilicas were built next to the entrances to the catacombs. The greatly popular patron of the city, San Gennaro (St. Januarius), was decapitated in nearby Pozzuoli in 305, and, since the 5th century, he has been commemorated by the basilica of San Gennaro extra Moenia. The Cathedral of Naples is also dedicated to St. Gennaro.

It was in Naples, in Lucullus's villa in what is now the Castel dell'Ovo, that Romulus Augustulus, the last nominal western emperor, was exiled after being deposed in 476.

Naples suffered much during the Gothic War (535–552) between the Ostrogoths and the Byzantines. In 536, it was garrisoned by Goths and decided to resist the Byzantine commander Belisarius's invasion. However, in the resulting Siege of Naples (536), his troops captured the city by entering through its aqueduct. With the changing tide of the war in the 540s, it was starved into surrender by the Ostrogoth Totila, who then treated it leniently. During Narses's expedition during the 550s, it was captured by the Empire once again. When the Lombards invaded and conquered much of Italy in the following years, Naples remained loyal to the Eastern Roman Empire.

== The Duchy of Naples ==
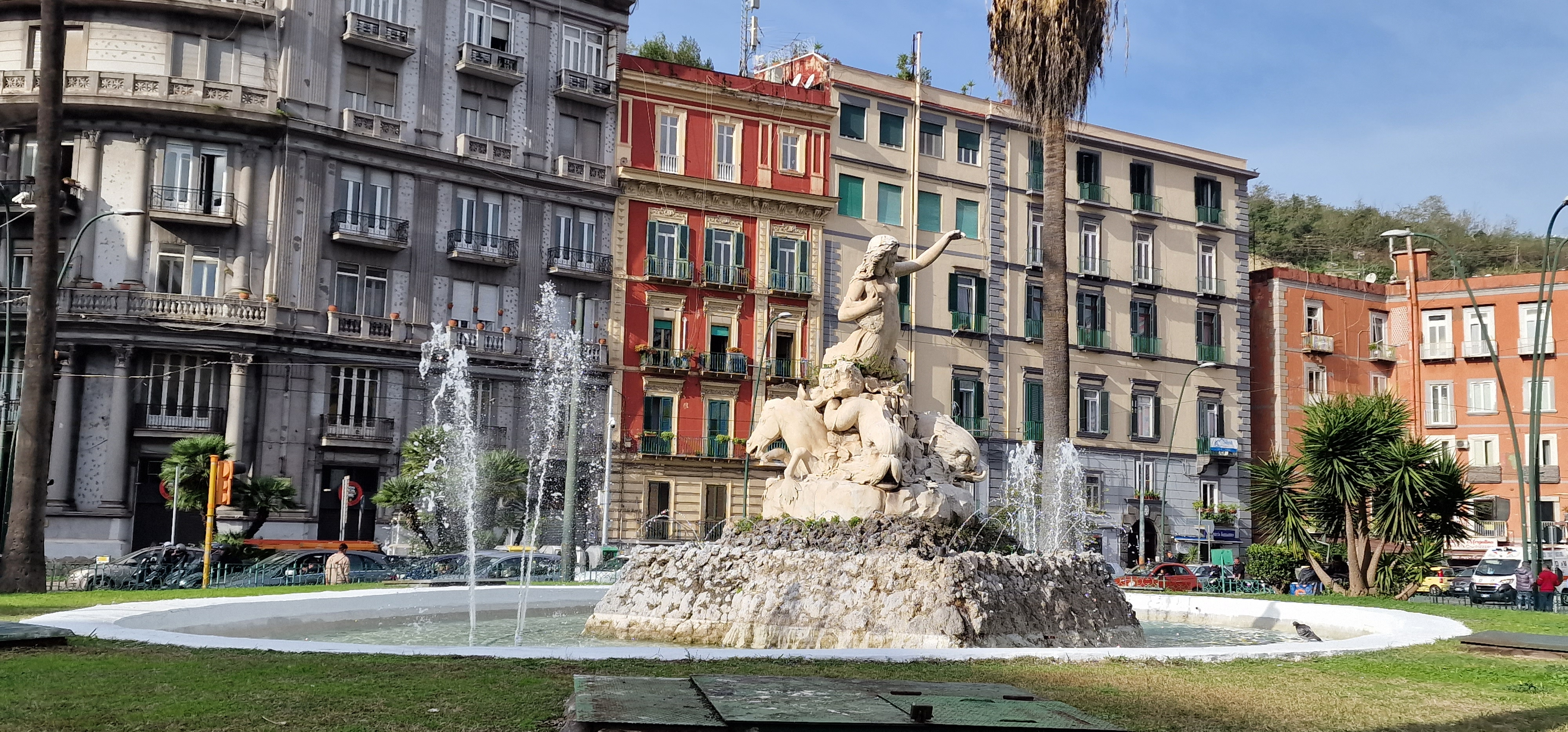
The Fontana della Sirena by Onofrio Buccino, 1869, perpetuates the image of Parthenope as patroness.

At the time of the Lombard invasion, Naples had a population of about 30,000-35,000. In 615, under Giovanni Consino, Naples rebelled for the first time against the Exarch of Ravenna, the emperor's plenipotentiary in Italy. In reply, the first form of duchy was created in 638 by the Exarch Isaac or Eleutherius (exarchic chronology is uncertain), but this official came from abroad and had to answer to the strategos of Sicily. At that time the Duchy of Naples controlled an area corresponding roughly to the present day Province of Naples, encompassing the area of Vesuvius, the Campi Flegrei, the Sorrentine peninsula, Giugliano, Aversa, Afragola, Nola and the islands of Ischia and Procida. Capri was later part of the Duchy of Amalfi.

In 661 Naples, with the permission of Emperor Constans II, was ruled by a local duke, Basilius, whose allegiance to the emperor soon became merely nominal. In 763, Duke Stephen II switched his allegiance from Constantinople to the Pope. In 840, Duke Sergius I made the succession to the duchy hereditary, and thenceforth Naples was de facto totally independent. At this time the city was mainly a military centre, ruled by an aristocracy of warriors and landowners, even though it had been forced to surrender to the neighbouring Lombards much of its inland territory. Naples was in fact not mainly a merchant city as other nearby sea cities like Amalfi and Gaeta, but had a respectable fleet who took part in the Battle of Ostia against the Arabs in 849, leading the Campanian League. In any event, Naples did not hesitate to ally itself with infidels if it proved advantageous to do so: in 836, for example, Naples asked for support from the Saracens in order to repel the siege of Lombard troops coming from the neighbouring Duchy of Benevento. Later, Muhammad I Abu 'l-Abbas sacked Miseno, but only for Khums purposes (Islamic booty), without conquering the territories of Campania. After Neapolitan dukes rose to prominence under the Duke-Bishop Athanasius and his successors (among these, Gregory IV and John II participated at the Battle of the Garigliano in 915), Naples declined in importance in the 10th century until it was captured by its traditional rival, Pandulf IV of Capua.

In 1027, duke Sergius IV donated the county of Aversa to a band of Norman mercenaries led by Rainulf Drengot, whose support he had needed in the war with the principality of Capua. In that period he could not imagine the consequences, but this settlement began a process which eventually led to the end of the independence of Naples.

Last of the rulers of such independent southern Italian states, Sergius VII was forced to surrender to Roger II of Sicily in 1137; Roger had had himself proclaimed king of Sicily seven years earlier. Under the new rulers, the city was administered by a compalazzo (palatine count), with little independence left to the Neapolitan patriciate. In this period Naples had a population of 30,000 and was sustained by its holdings in the interior; commerce was mainly delegated to foreigners, mainly from Pisa and Genoa.

Apart from the church of San Giovanni a Mare, Norman buildings in Naples were mainly lay ones, notably castles (Castel Capuano and Castel dell'Ovo), walls and fortified gates.

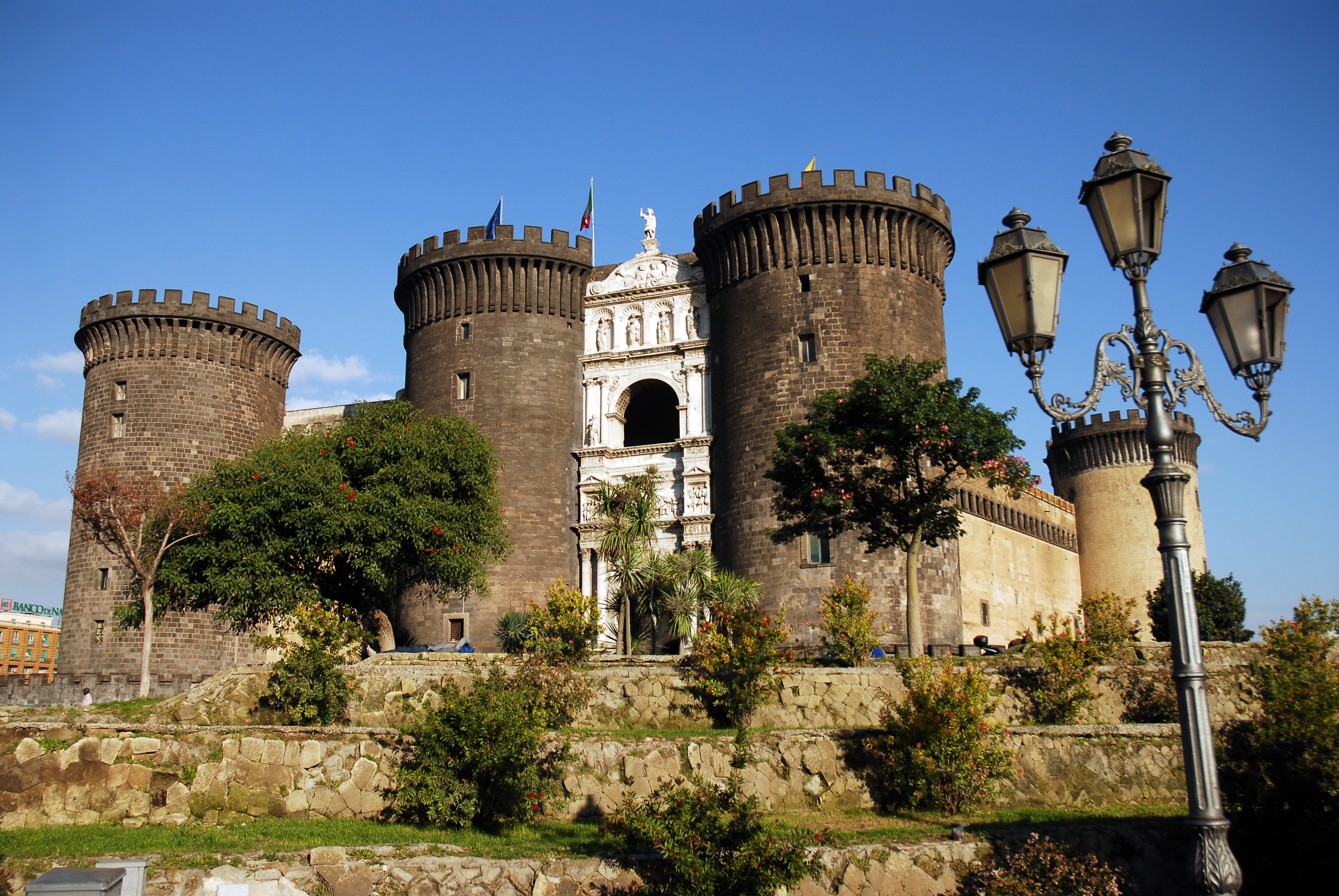
The Castel Nuovo ("New Castle") was renovated and chosen as his palace by Charles I of Anjou. The entrance is decorated by a Renaissance Arch of Triumph celebrating the entrance in the city of the Aragonese king Alfonso I (15th century).

== Normans, Hohenstaufen, and Anjou ==
After a period of Norman rule, in 1189 the Kingdom of Sicily was in a succession dispute between Tancred, King of Sicily of an illegitimate birth and the Hohenstaufens, a German royal house, as its Prince Henry had married Princess Constance the last legitimate heir to the Sicilian throne. In 1191 Henry invaded Sicily after being crowned as Henry VI, Holy Roman Emperor and many cities surrendered, but Naples resisted him from May to August under the leadership of Richard, Count of Acerra, Nicholas of Ajello, Aligerno Cottone and Margaritus of Brindisi before the Germans suffered from disease and were forced to retreat. Conrad II, Duke of Bohemia and Philip I, Archbishop of Cologne died of disease during the siege. In light of this Tancred achieved another unexpected achievement that his contender Constance, now empress, was captured at Salerno while those cities surrendered to Germans resubmitted to Tancred. Tancred had the empress imprisoned at Castel dell'Ovo at Naples before her release in May 1192. In 1194 Henry started his second campaign upon the death of Tancred, but this time Aligerno surrendered without resistance, and finally Henry conquered Sicily, putting it under the rule of Hohenstaufens.

Frederick II Hohenstaufen founded the university in 1224, considering Naples as his intellectual capital while Palermo retained its political role. The university remained unique in southern Italy for seven centuries. After the defeat of Frederick's son, Manfred, in 1266 Naples and the kingdom of Sicily were assigned by Pope Clement IV to Charles of Anjou, who moved the capital from Palermo to Naples. He settled in his new residence in the Castel Nuovo, around which a new district grew up, marked by palaces and residences of the nobility. During Charles' reign new Gothic churches were also built, including Santa Chiara, San Lorenzo Maggiore and the Cathedral of Naples.

After the Sicilian Vespers (1284), the kingdom was split in two parts, with an Aragonese king ruling the island of Sicily and the Angevin king ruling the mainland portion; while both kingdoms officially called themselves the Kingdom of Sicily, the mainland portion was commonly referred to as the Kingdom of Naples. The Hungarian Angevin king Louis the Great captured the city several times. The kingdom had been divided in two, but Naples grew in importance: Pisan and Genoese merchants were joined by Tuscan bankers, and with them came outstanding artists such as Boccaccio, Petrarca, and Giotto.

== The Aragonese period ==
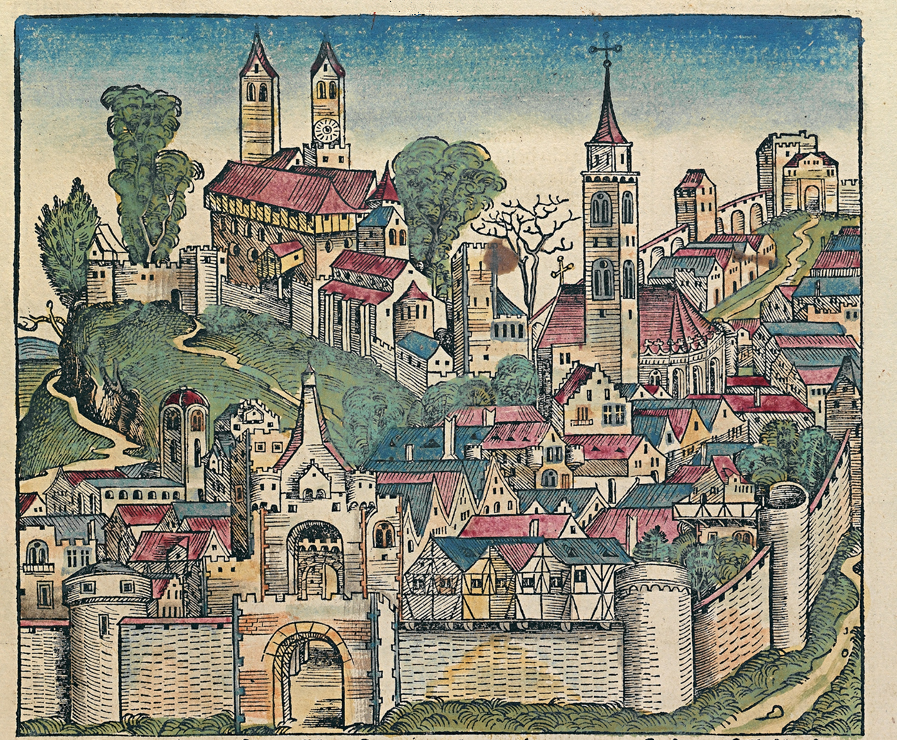
Idealized depiction of Naples from the 1493 Nuremberg Chronicle

In 1442 Alfonso V of Aragon conquered Naples after his victory against the last Angevin king, Rene, and made his triumphal entry into the city in February 1443. The new dynasty enhanced commerce by connecting Naples to the Iberian peninsula and made Naples a centre of the Italian Renaissance: artists who worked in Naples in this period include Francesco Laurana, Antonello da Messina, Jacopo Sannazzaro and Angelo Poliziano. The court also granted land holdings in the provinces to the nobility; this, however, had the effect of fragmenting the kingdom.

After the brief conquest by Charles VIII of France in 1495, the two kingdoms were united under Aragonese rule in 1501. In 1502 Castilian general Gonzalo Fernández de Córdoba entered in the city. Although Fernández de Córdoba was Castilian, he conquered under the command of Ferdinand II of Aragon. Ferdinand and his wife Isabella I of Castile ruled their kingdoms jointly in personal union during their marriage. But the partnership of the Catholic Monarchs ceased with Isabella's death in 1504, and Ferdinand expelled the Castilians from leadership in Aragonese possessions in Italy, including Naples. The conquest began nearly two centuries of rule of the almost omnipotent viceré ("viceroys") in Naples.

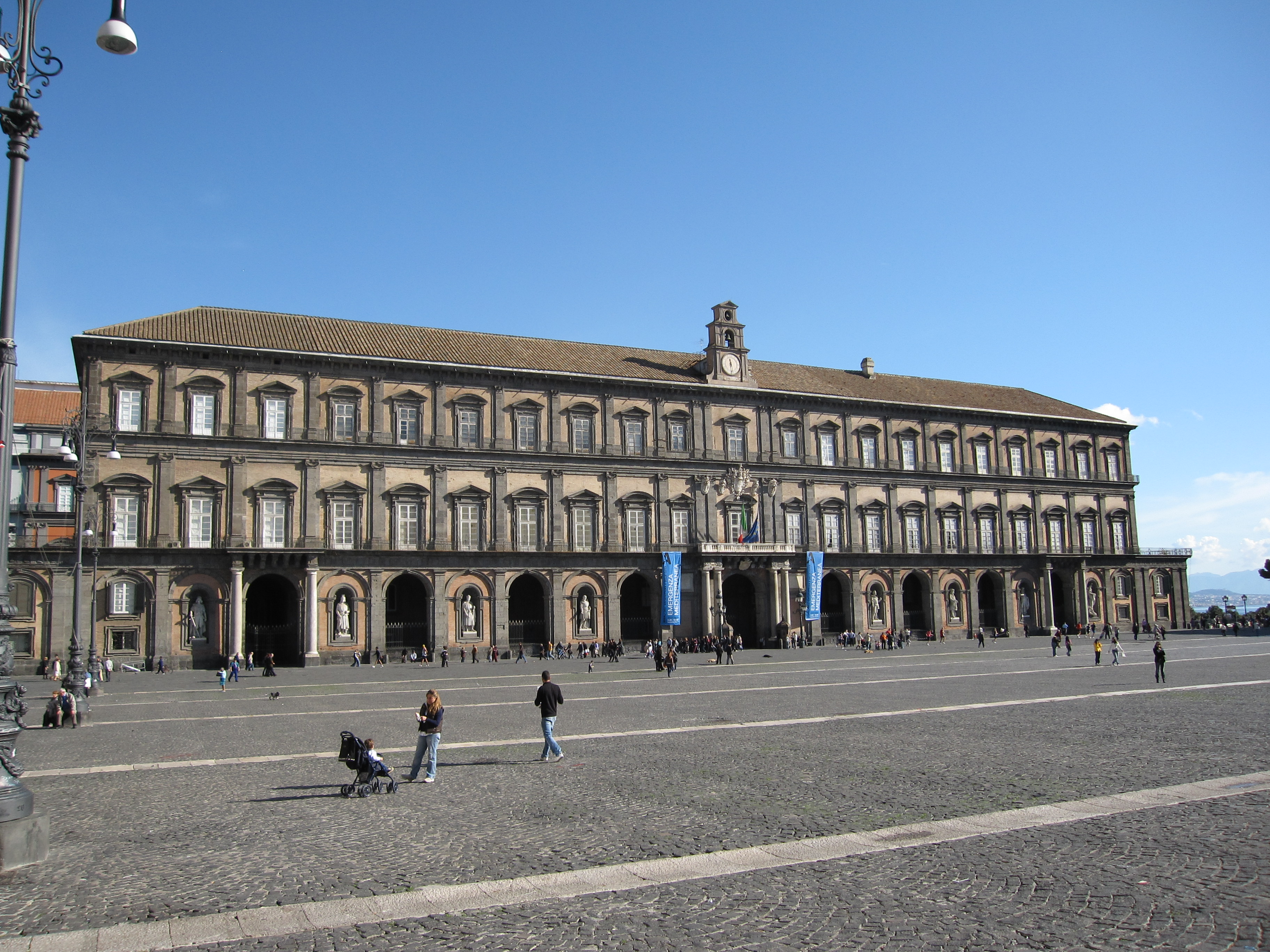
Palazzo Reale ("Royal Palace") was the seat of Spanish and Austrian viceroys.

Under the viceroys Naples grew from 100,000 to 300,000 inhabitants, second only to Istanbul in Europe. The most important of them was don Pedro Álvarez de Toledo: he introduced heavy taxation and favoured the Inquisition, but at the same time improved the conditions of Naples. He opened the main street, which still today bears his name; he paved other roads, strengthened and expanded the walls, restored old buildings, and erected new buildings and fortresses, essentially turning the city of Naples by 1560 into the largest and best fortified city in the Spanish empire. In the 16th and 17th century Naples was home to great artists such as Caravaggio, Salvator Rosa and Bernini, philosophers such as Bernardino Telesio, Giordano Bruno, Tommaso Campanella and Giambattista Vico, and writers such as Gian Battista Marino, thus confirming itself among the most important capitals of Europe. All these cultural figures contributed to the aesthetic and intellectual transformations leading to a new era, commonly defined as Baroque. Patrons and salon-holders such as Aurora Sanseverino, Isabella Pignone del Carretto and Ippolita Cantelmo Stuart had a significant role in the artistic and cultural life in Naples.

All the strains of an increasingly over-populated city exploded in July 1647, when the legendary Masaniello led the populace in violent rebellion against the foreign, oppressive rule of the Spanish. Neapolitans declared a Republic and asked France for support, but the Spaniards suppressed the insurrection in April of the following year and defeated two attempts by the French fleet to land troops. In 1656 the plague killed almost half of the inhabitants of the city; this led to the beginning of a period of decline.

=== 1714 to 1799 ===
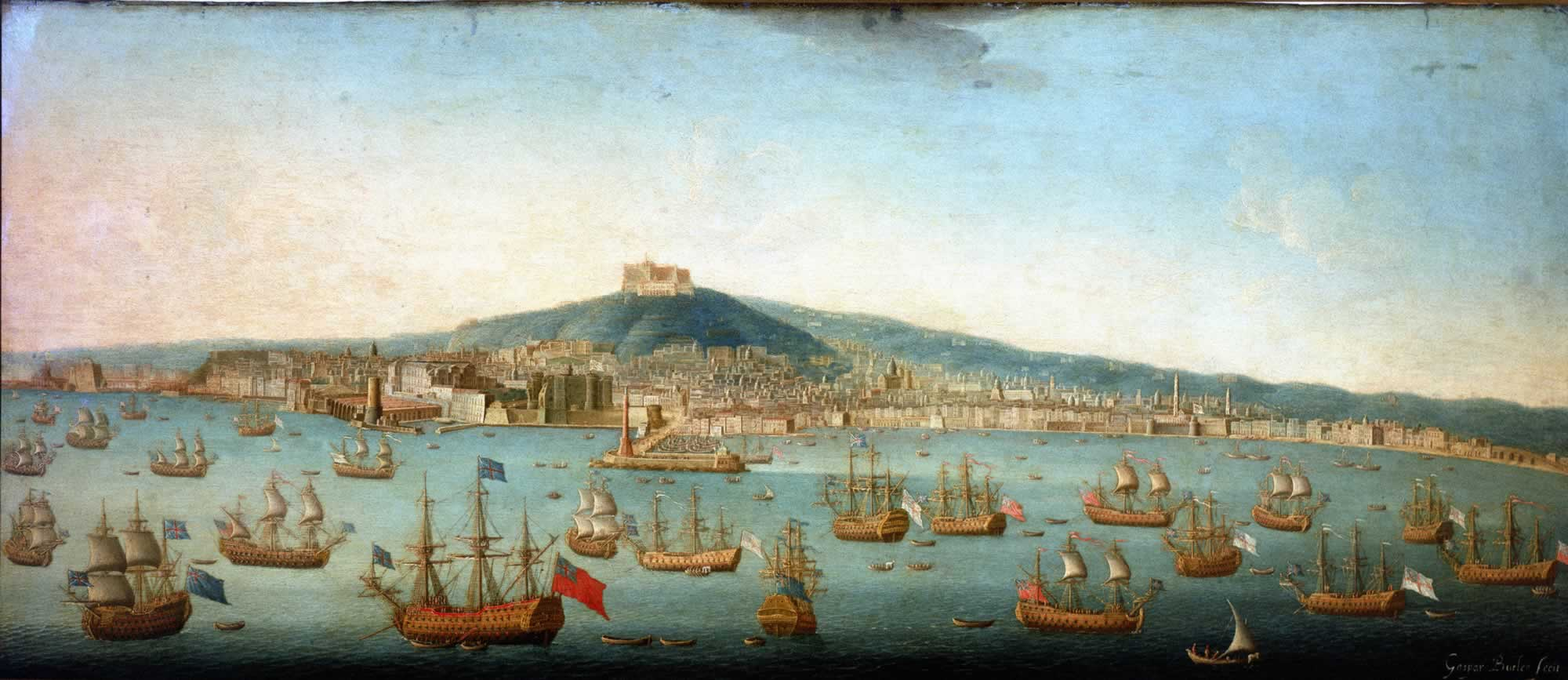
View of the Bay of Naples with a British fleet commanded by Admiral George Byng at anchor, 1 August 1718, just before the Battle of Cape Passaro. Painting by Gaspar Butler.

The Spanish Habsburgs were replaced in 1714 by Austrian ones, until in 1734 the two kingdoms were united under a single independent crown (Utriusque Siciliarum), that of Charles of Bourbon. Charles renovated the city with the Villa di Capodimonte and the Teatro di San Carlo, and welcomed the philosophers Giovan Battista Vico and Antonio Genovesi, the jurists Pietro Giannone and Gaetano Filangieri, and the composers Alessandro and Domenico Scarlatti. This first king of the House of Bourbon tried to introduce legislative and administrative reforms, but they were stopped as the first news of the French Revolution reached the city. By that time, Charles' son, Ferdinand IV was king, and he entered an anti-French Coalition with Great Britain, Russia, Austria, Prussia, Spain, and Portugal.

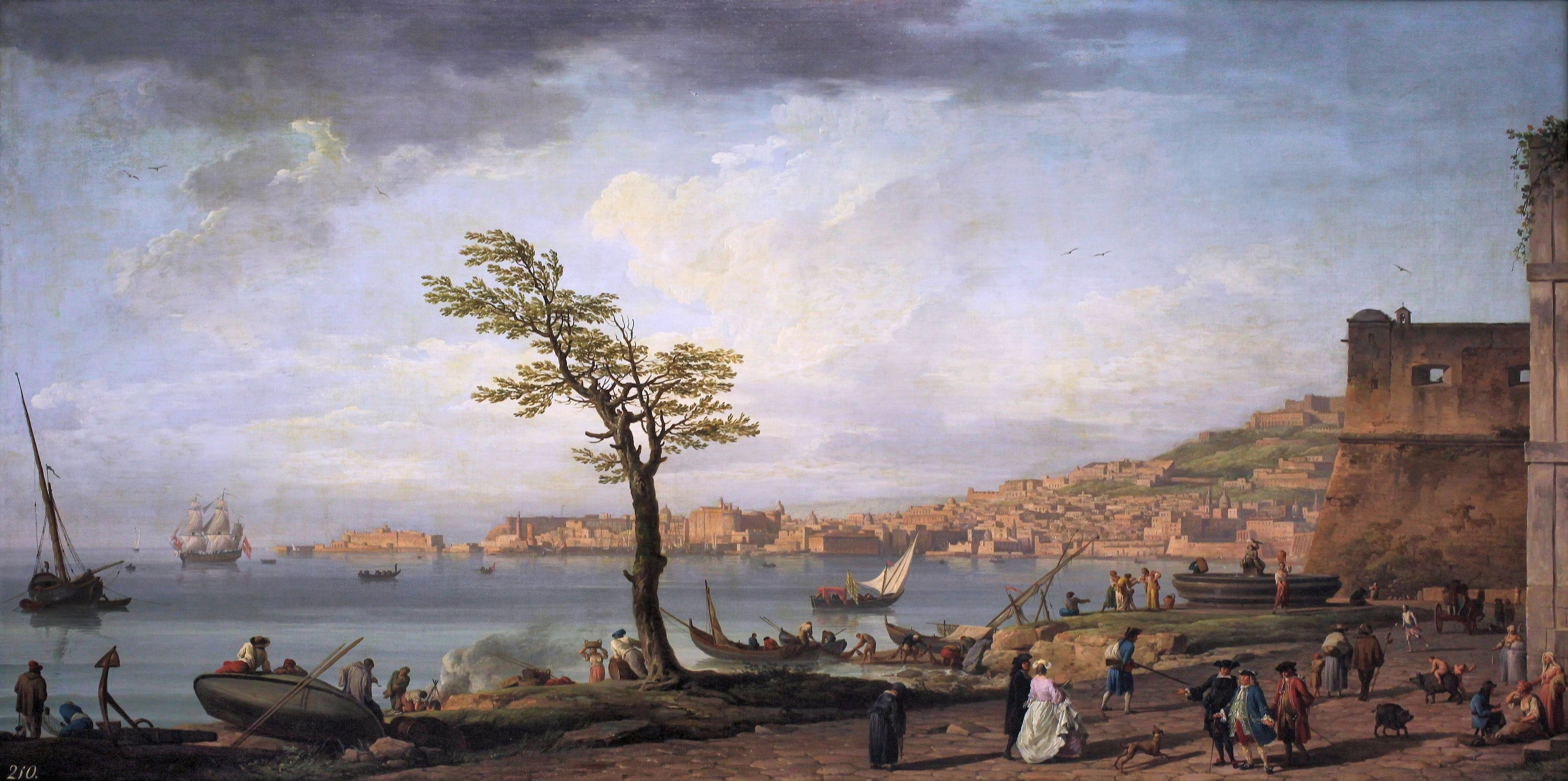
The Bay of Naples, by Joseph Vernet, 1748

The population of Naples at the beginning of the 19th century was mostly made up of a mass of people, who were called the lazzarone and lived in extremely poor conditions. As well, there was a strong royal bureaucracy and an élite of landowners. When in January 1799 French revolutionary troops entered the city they were hailed by a pro-revolutionary minor part of the middle class, but had to face strong resistance by the royalist lazzari, who were fervidly religious and did not support the new ideas. The short-lived Neapolitan Republic tried to gain popular support by abolishing feudal privileges, but the mass of the people rebelled and in June 1799 the republicans surrendered. Upon the order of the restored monarchy, Admiral Horatio Nelson arrested the leaders of the revolution and handed them over for execution Francesco Caracciolo, Mario Pagano, Ettore Carafa, and Eleonora Fonseca Pimentel. Nelson was rewarded by being made Duke of Bronte by the king.

=== 1799 to 1861 ===
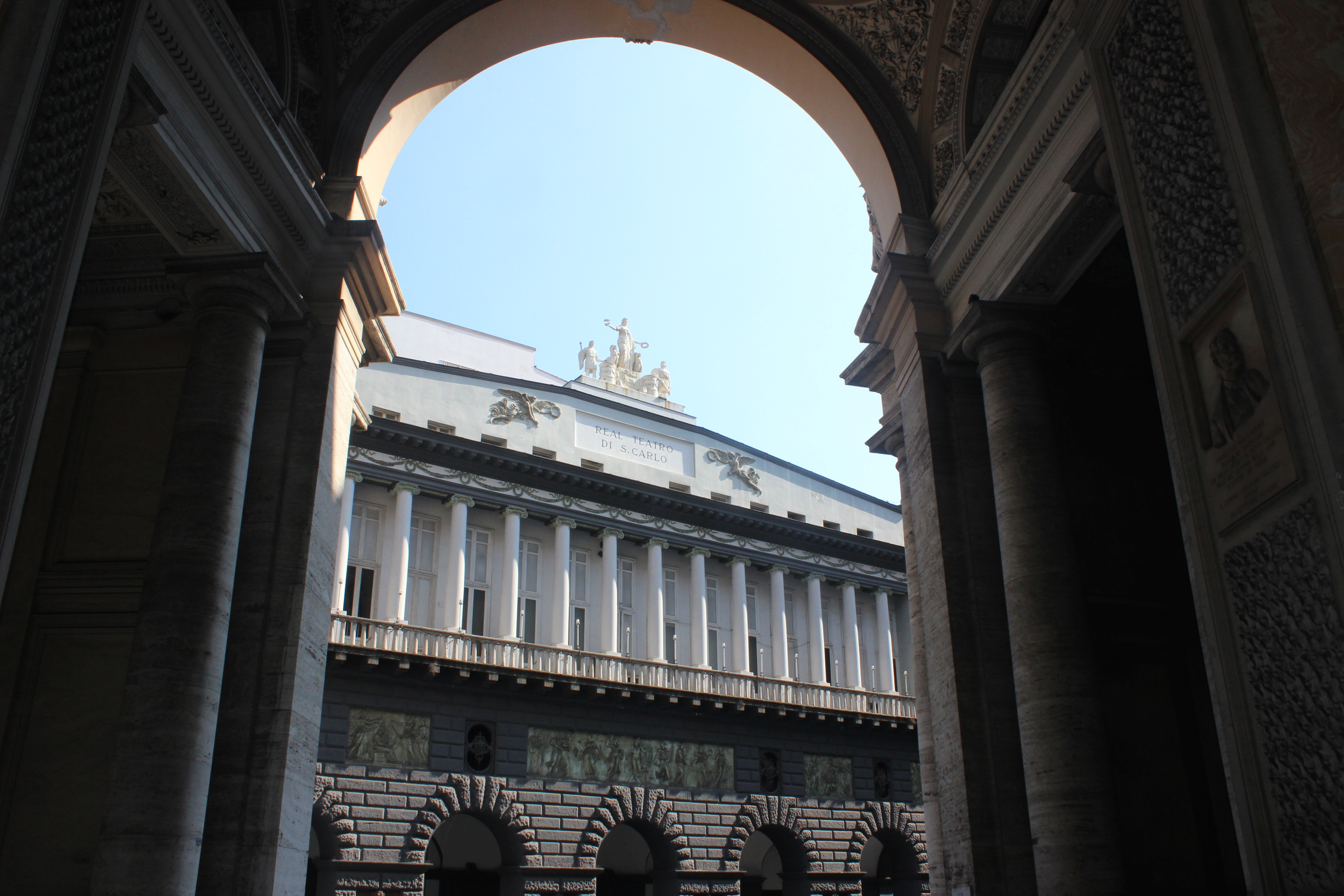
The Theatre of San Carlo was built during the reign of Charles I of Bourbon.

The Parthenopaean Republic in Naples was suppressed by the British and Russians in 1799, and was following in 1805 by a full invasion. In early 1806 Napoleon conquered the Kingdom of Naples. The Emperor Napoleon first named his brother Joseph Bonaparte to be King and then his brother-in-law and Marshal Joachim Murat in 1808, when Joseph was given the Spanish crown. The latter created a communal administration led by a mayor, which was left almost intact by Ferdinand in 1815 as he regained his kingdom after the 1815 Neapolitan War in which the Austrians defeated Murat. In 1839 Naples was the first city in Italy to have a railway, with the Napoli-Portici line.

In spite of a little cultural revival and the proclamation of a Constitution on 25 June 1860, in the last years of the kingdom the gap between the court and the intellectual class continued to grow.

On 6 September 1860, the kingdom was conquered by the Garibaldines and was handed over to the King of Sardinia: Garibaldi entered the city by train, descending in the square that today still bears his name. In October 1860 a plebiscite sanctioned the end of the Kingdom of Sicily and the birth of a new Italian state, the united Kingdom of Italy.

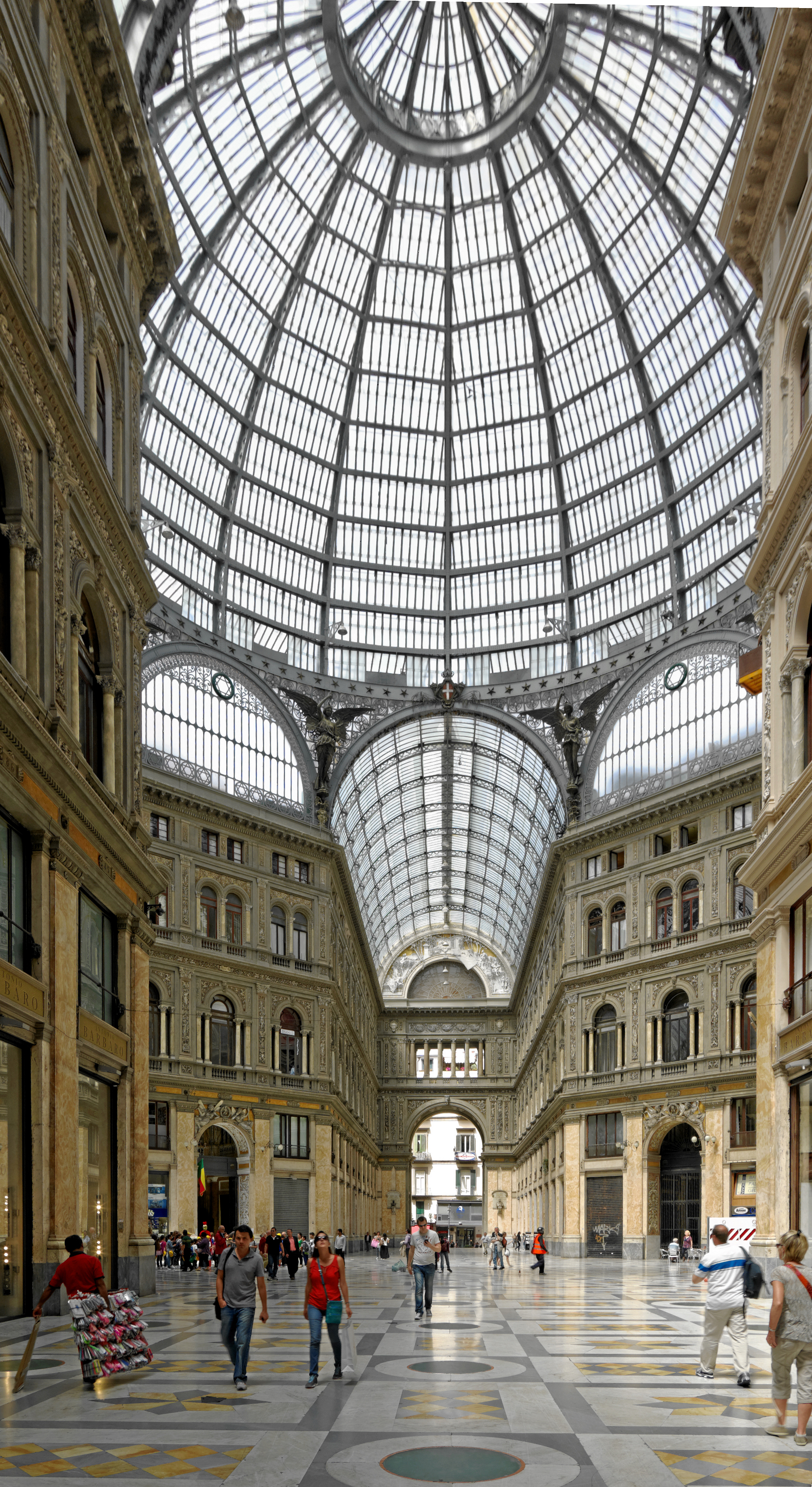
Galleria Umberto, 1887–91

== Contemporary age ==
The opening of the funicular railway to Mount Vesuvius was occasion for the writing of the famous song "Funiculì, Funiculà", one more song in the centuries long tradition of Neapolitan song. Many Neapolitan songs are also famous outside of Italy, as for example "'O sole mio", "Santa Lucia" and "Torna a Surriento". On 7 April 1906 nearby Mount Vesuvius erupted, devastating Boscotrecase and seriously damaging Ottaviano.

During World War II, Naples was the first Italian city to rise up against the Nazi military occupation; between 28 September and 1 October 1943 the people of the city rose up and pushed the Germans out, in what became known as the "four days of Naples". British Armoured patrols of the King's Dragoon Guards were the first allied unit to reach Naples. They were followed by the Royal Scots Greys followed by troops of the US 82nd Airborne Division; they found Naples already free, and continued on instead towards Rome.

In 1944 another devastating eruption from Vesuvius occurred; images from this eruption were used in the film The War of the Worlds.

Napoli has turned into the most important transportation hub of southern Italy. The airport of Capodichino has connections across Europe. The city also has an important port that connects to many Tyrrhenian Sea destinations, including Cagliari, Genoa and Palermo, often with fast ferries. Naples also has ferry connections to nearby islands and Sorrento, and fast rail connections to Rome and the south. It is noted for the light railway Circumvesuviana.

Organised crime is deeply rooted in Naples. The Camorra, the feuding Neapolitan gangs and families, have a long history. During 2004 over 120 people died in Naples in Camorra killings; many of the deaths were related to the drug trade.

Unemployment remains very high in Naples, with some estimates running above 20% among working-age males. The industrial base is still small and a number of earlier and ambitious enterprises such as automobile manufacturing plants on the outskirts have closed and gone elsewhere. There is a large "submerged economy"—meaning the black market—and it is difficult to have reliable statistics on the amount of wealth generated by such activity. Social services in the city have come under recent strain in attempting to deal with the increase in immigration.

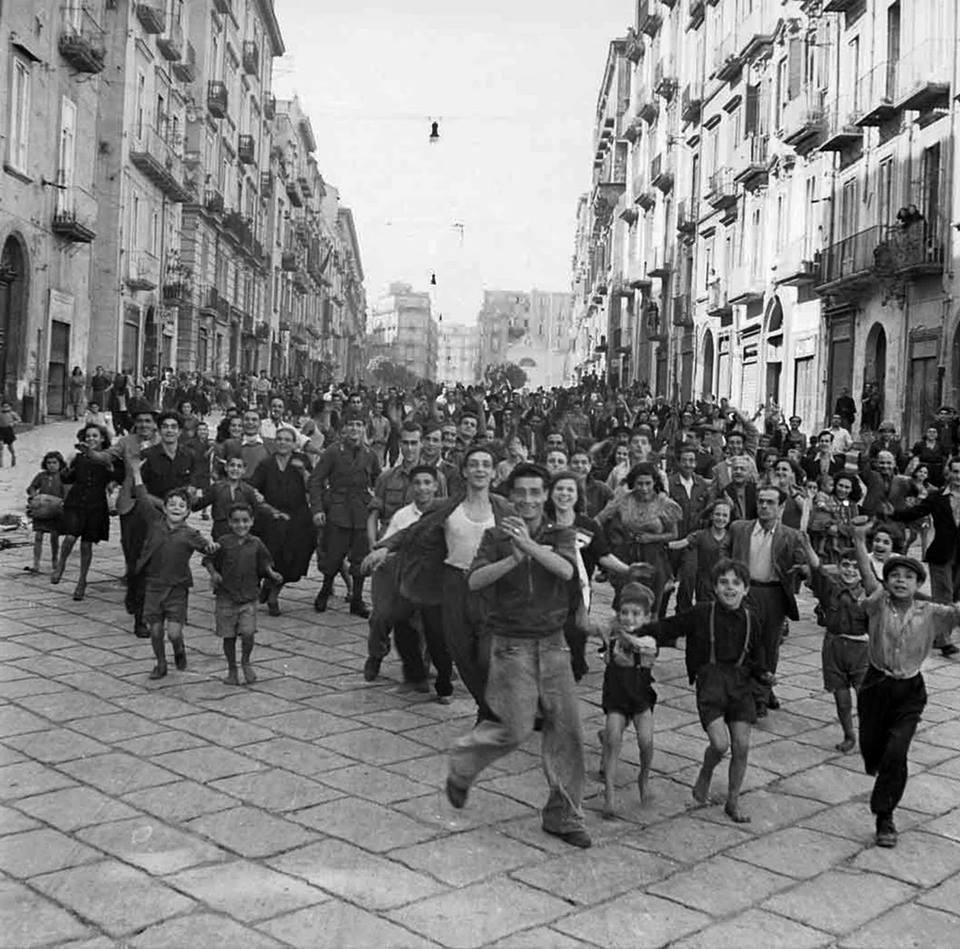
People in Naples welcoming Allied troops on 1 October 1943

Italy's first Metropolitan railway (now Linea 2) was opened in Naples in 1925.

Four funicular railways were opened between 1889 and 1931. Two of these link the residential area of Vomero to the historic centre of the city. One links Vomero with Chiaia and one, in the western part of the city, links Mergellina with Posillipo.

In 1927 Naples absorbed some nearby communities; the 1860 population of 450,000 increased to 1,250,000 in 1971.

Cosmetically, at least, Naples improved in the two decades either side of the turn of the 21st century: Piazza del Plebiscito, for example, has returned to its historic role as the largest open square in the city instead of being the squalid parking lot that it was between the end of WWII and 1990; city landmarks such as the San Carlo theater and the Galleria Umberto have been restored; a major ring road, the tangenziale di Napoli, has alleviated traffic through and around the city; and major construction continues on the new underground railway system, the Naples Metro (metropolitana di Napoli), which, even its current unfinished state now provides easy transportation for the first time in the history of the city from the upper reaches of the Vomero hill section of the city into the downtown area. As a result of at least some of these improved conditions in the city, tourism has increased. Naples became the world's 91st richest city by purchasing power in 2005, with a GDP of US$43 billion, surpassing Budapest and Zurich, and unemployment decreased dramatically between the 1990s and 2010.

== See also ==
- Timeline of Naples history
- Principato Ultra

== Bibliography ==
- Magnusson, Magnus; Goring, Rosemary, eds. (1990). Cambridge Biographical Dictionary. Cambridge, UK: Cambridge University Press. ISBN 0-521-39518-6.
- Clemente, Alida; Feniello, Amedeo; Frascani, Paolo, eds. (2026). The Routledge Handbook of the History of Naples since the Late Middle Ages. London: Routledge. doi:10.4324/9781003411512. ISBN 9781032533261.
