= Gennaro Serra, Duke of Cassano =

Gennaro Serra, Prince of Cassano (September 30, 1772 – August 20, 1799) was an Italian revolutionary and soldier, who fought for the brief Parthenopean Republic in Naples.

== Biography ==
He was born at Portici to a prominent aristocratic family. His mother was Giulia Carafa and his father was the Duke Luigi Francesco Serra of Cassano (Calabria). As a young man, he traveled with his elder brother Giuseppe, the Marquis of Trevi, to study in Paris. There, however, he became attached to revolutionary republican ideas.

Returning to Naples in 1795, he was soon arrested for distributing copies of the Declaration of the Rights of Man and of the Citizen. He was freed along with Mario Pagano and Ignazio Ciaia on July 25, 1798, after the intervention of members of the court.

In January 1799, when the French army of General Championett and a rebellion in Naples forced the King Ferdinand IV of Naples to scurry to safety in Sicily, Serra was among the young nobles who joined the efforts to defend the Parthenopean Republic. His father was invited to participate in the city council, but turned down the offer. Giuseppe took his place. Gennaro was made captain of the National Guard established to defend the city.

When the directory commissioned Serra to establish a cavalry unit to help defend the city, the pamphletist Eleonora Pimentel criticized the goal as elitist: "Only young men of fortune conveniently have horses, who exercised them at the races, at games, and in horse riding: (we should) also invite young people from less fortunate who can not have them to join the cavalry". Serra, as head of the National Guard, seeing the precariousness of the situation, opined "that before we can reach the good of existing perfectly, we wish to start with existing; and a good body of cavalry will further the existence of the Republic".

By early summer, the French had retreated, and the Republic collapsed under the assaults by the Sanfedisti under Cardinal Ruffo. Gennaro was among the last resistors who held the Palace of Capodimonte. While he had surrendered to Ruffo under terms that spared his life, Ferdinand did not respect the terms, and ordered Gennaro and many other republicans beheaded. His last words at his public execution in the mercato were:

I have always desired their welfare, and they are rejoicing at my death.

Eleonora Pimentel, Giuliano Colonna, Filippo Marini, the priest Nicola Pacifico, and the Bishop of Vico, Michele Natale, were executed on the same day. Only Colonna and Serra were beheaded.

== Legacy ==
Like many young persons caught up in the counter-revolutionary purges, such as Luisa Sanfelice and Ettore Carafa, his courage and idealism reverberated with future aspiring patriots. It is said that at the Palazzo Serra di Cassano in Naples, the door facing towards the Royal Palace was walled off by Gennaro's mother in protest of the execution of her son.
