= Castel dell'Ovo =

Castle in Naples, Italy

Coordinates: 40°49′40″N 14°14′53″E

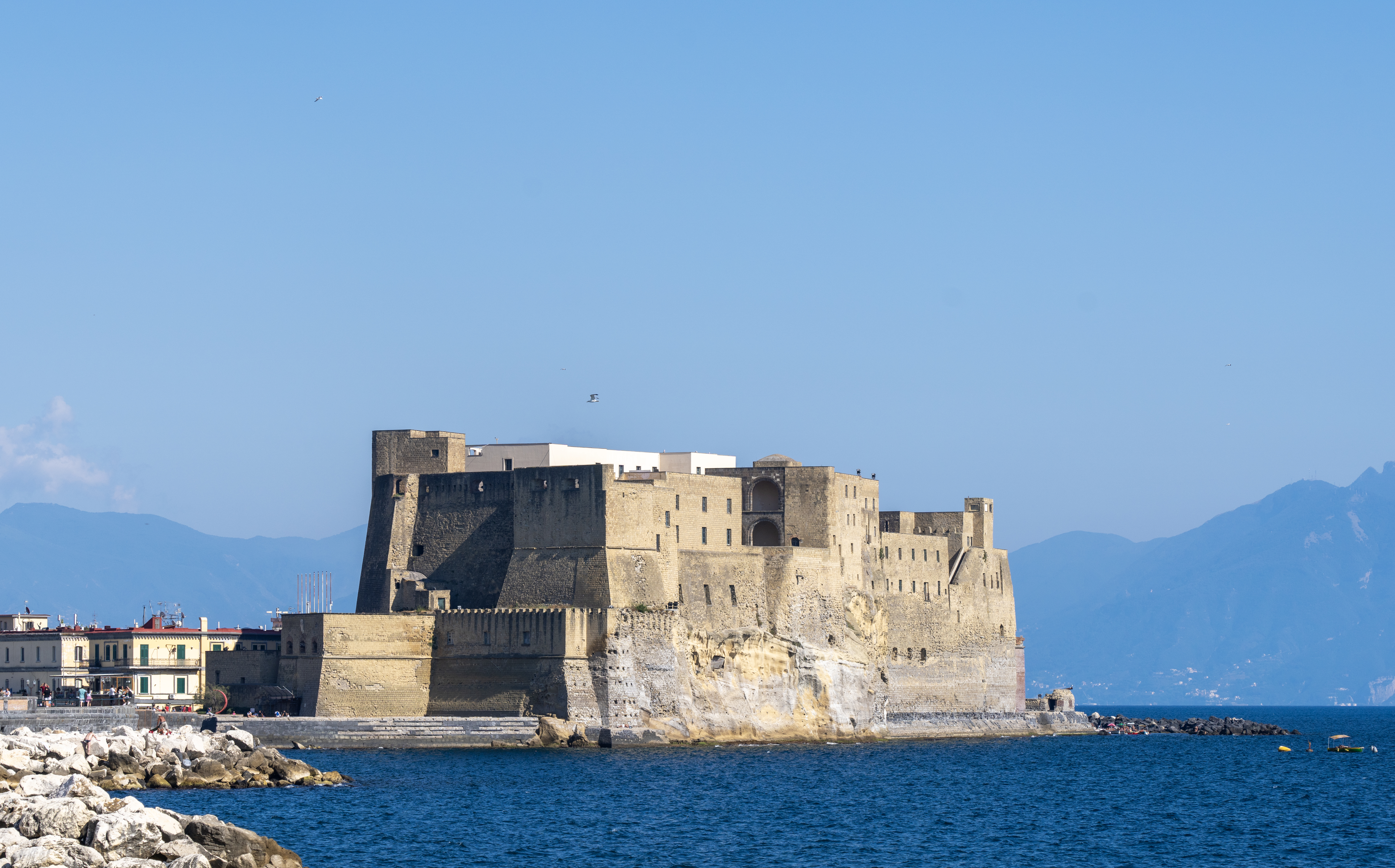
The castle seen from the west

Castel dell'Ovo ("Egg Castle") is a seafront castle in Naples, located on the former island of Megaride, now a peninsula, on the Gulf of Naples in Italy. The castle's name comes from a legend about the Roman poet Virgil, who had a reputation in the Middle Ages as a great sorcerer and predictor of the future. In the legend, Virgil put a magical egg into the foundations to support the fortifications. It remains there along with his bones, and had this egg been broken, the castle would have been destroyed and a series of disastrous events for Naples would have followed. The castle is located between the districts of San Ferdinando and Chiaia, facing Mergellina across the sea.

== History during the ancient times ==
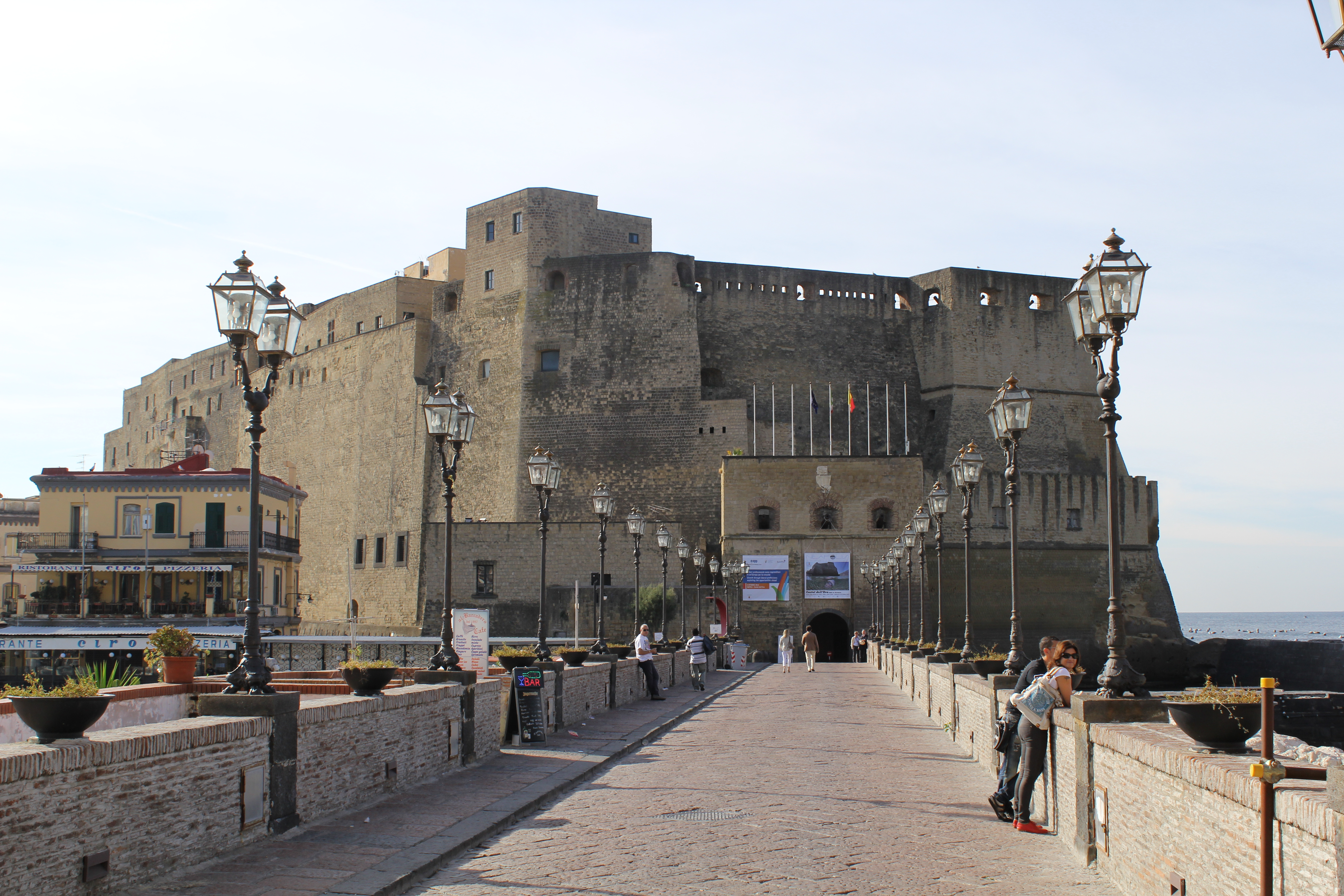
The entrance to Castel dell'Ovo from the north

The Castel dell'Ovo is the oldest castle in Naples.

Around 650 B.C., Greek settlers from Cumae founded a settlement in the harbor area known as Palaeopolis ("Old City"), which included Megaris (or Megaride) and Pizzofalcone. Ancient sources also suggest that Megaris itself may previously have been the site of a Rhodian trading colony. Later, as the population expanded northeast on a Hippodamian grid plan, the newer section of the city became known as Neapolis ("New City"; modern Naples), while Palaeopolis became a suburb.

In the 1st century BC, the Roman patrician Lucius Licinius Lucullus built part of the magnificent villa, later called Castellum Lucullanum, on the site.

Fortified by Valentinian III in the mid-5th century AD, it was the site to which one of the last Western Roman emperors, Romulus Augustulus, was exiled in 476. Eugippius founded a monastery on the site after 492.

== History from Norman to Napoleonic conquests ==
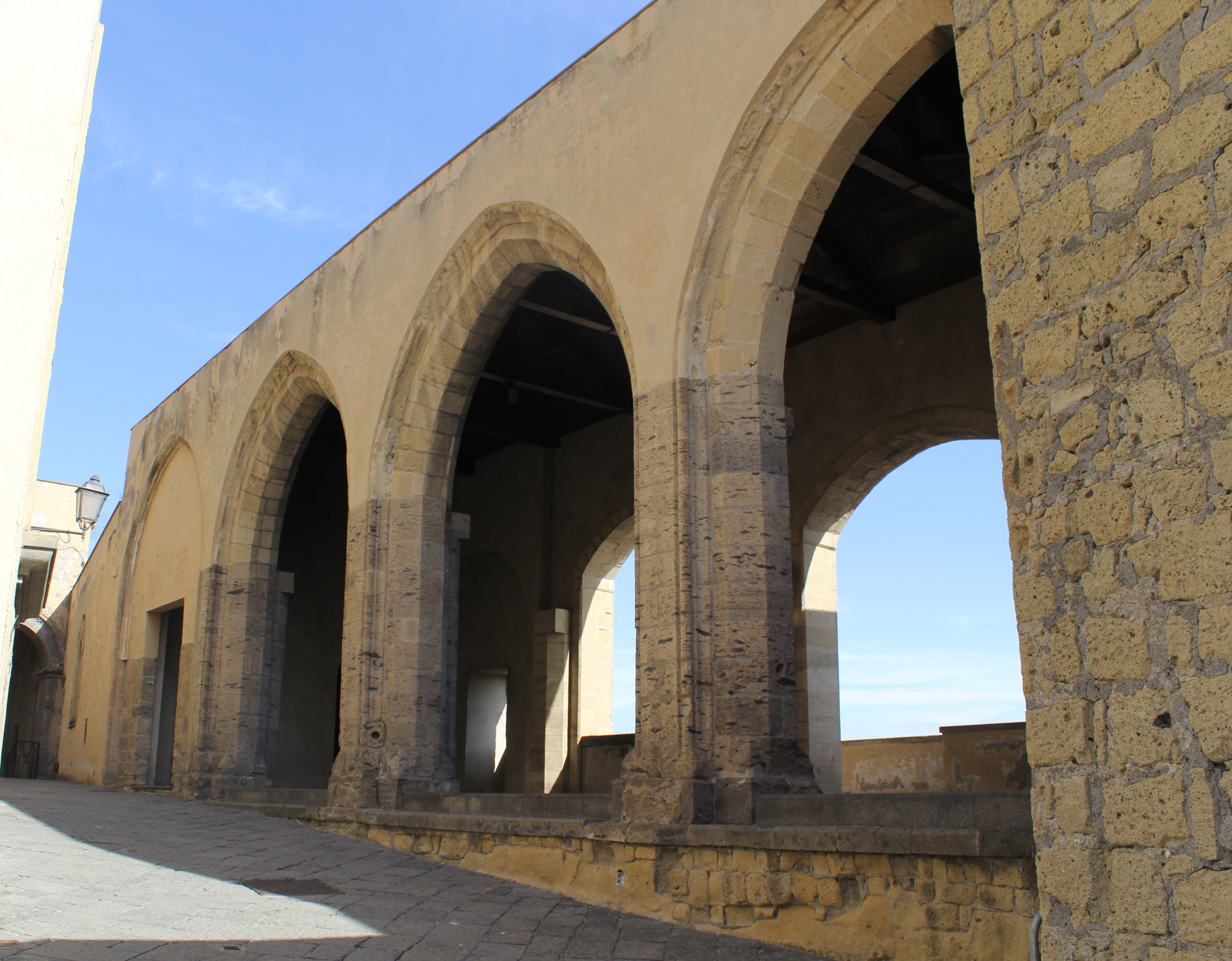
Inside the castle

The remains of the Roman-era structures and later fortifications were demolished by local residents in the 9th century to prevent their use by Saracen raiders. The first castle on the site was built by the Normans in the 12th century. Roger the Norman, conquering Naples in 1140, made Castel dell'Ovo his seat. The importance of the Castel dell'Ovo began to decline when king Charles I of Anjou (r. 1266–85) built a new castle, Castel Nuovo, and moved his court there. Castel dell'Ovo became the seat of the Royal Chamber and of the State Treasury. It also served as a prison. In 1191, Empress Constance of the Holy Roman Empire, daughter of Roger, was captured during her struggle with her nephew Tancred, King of Sicily for the crown of Sicily, and Sicilian Chancellor Matthew d'Ajello wrote to Tancred persuading him to lock her in the island Castel dell'Ovo to be better-guarded and secluded from people, and wrote to nobleman Aligerno Cottone in charge of defending Naples ordering him to "ut imperatricem in Castro Salvatoris ad mare benè custodiat" (properly guard the empress in "Castle of the Savior" (i. e. Castel dell'Ovo) in the sea). However, Constance was released the next year and finally became Queen of Sicily. In 1268, King Conradin was imprisoned here before his trial and execution. Also imprisoned here were children of Manfred, King of Sicily, after their father's defeat in the Battle of Benevento from Charles I of Anjou. In 1381, Queen Joanna I of Naples was also imprisoned there for a time after having been forced to surrender to her enemy Charles of Durazzo, the future Charles III of Naples, before her assassination.

The castle's present form dates from the period of the Aragonese domination (15th century) in Naples. However, later repairs occurred when the castle was bombarded both by French and Spanish artillery during the Italian Wars. In the short-lived Neapolitan Republic of 1799 the outbreak of clashes between the new regime's defenders and pro-Bourbon segments of the population led to the use of the artillery of the castle.

After a long period of decay, the fortifications of the castle were repaired extensively in a renovation project that started in 1975.

== Present ==
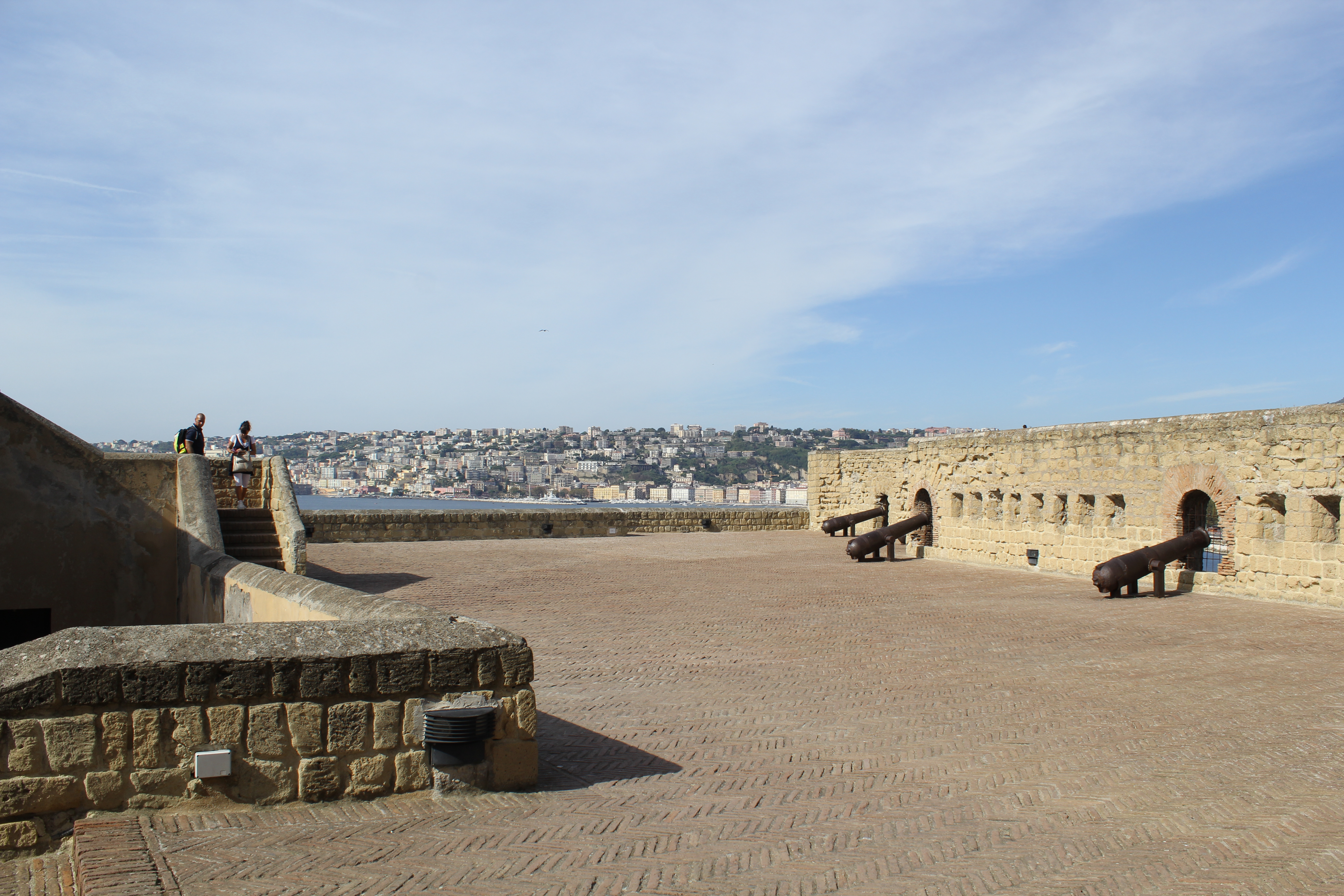
The northern battery had six cannons.

In the 19th century, a small settlement of fishermen had been established in the immediate eastern vicinity of the castle known as Borgo Marinaro, which today has been shaped in the marina and its restaurants. The castle's plan is rectangular, approximately 200 by 45 metres at its widest, and a high bastion overlooks the causeway that connects it to the shore. The causeway, measuring a little more than 100 metres of length, is a popular location for newlyweds to have their wedding photos taken. The castle's buildings today are used as spaces for exhibitions and related cultural events. The promontory that extends to the castle's front in its southeast was, probably, used as a quay, that a large round tower just across the castle's southern tip would have protected.

Underwater archaeologists have discovered what appears to be a 2500-year-old harbor associated with the origins of the first Greek settlement of Paleopolis (which preceded the ancient city of Neapolis, now Naples) in the sea next to the castle. Four tunnels, a 10-foot-wide street demonstrating furrows consistent with cart traffic, and a trench likely built as a defensive structure for soldiers were submerged immediately adjacent to the castle. The discovery was announced in March 2018, after the September 2017 identification of the original port of Neapolis.

== Bibliography ==
- Di Maggio, Patrizia (1992). Angelillo, Fiorella (ed.). I castelli di Napoli. Elio De Rosa. p. 15.
