= Giulia Carafa =

Giulia Carafa Cantelmo Stuart, duchess di Cassano (1755–1841) was an Italian courtier. She was a supporter of the Parthenopean Republic and alongside her sister, she was known as one of the Republic's two Madri della Patria ('Mothers of the Nation').

== Life ==
She was born to prince Gennaro I de Roccella and Teresa Carafa di Forli, and married duke Luigi Serra di Cassano.

She served as lady-in-waiting to queen Maria Carolina of Austria was at one point courted by king Ferdinand I of the Two Sicilies, though she reportedly refused him. Her sister Maria Antonia Carafa, duchess di Popoli (1763-1823), married Carlo di Tocco in 1779, and the two sisters were reportedly very close and normally appeared together.

Her son Gennaro Serra, Duke of Cassano was one of the leaders of the Parthenopean Republic. During the days of the republic, Giulia Carafa and her sister became known in Naples for their efforts in collecting funds to help the wounded and the sick of the republic, and was named by Eleonora Pimentel Fonseca as Madri della Patria ('Mothers of the Nation'). When the republic was defeated, her son was executed. She and her sister were sentenced to confiscation and exile.

Giulia Carafa returned to Naples in 1804, but her mental health deteriorated to insanity. Her sister never returned to Naples and committed suicide in 1823.
