= Villa of Lucullus =

Ancient Roman villa

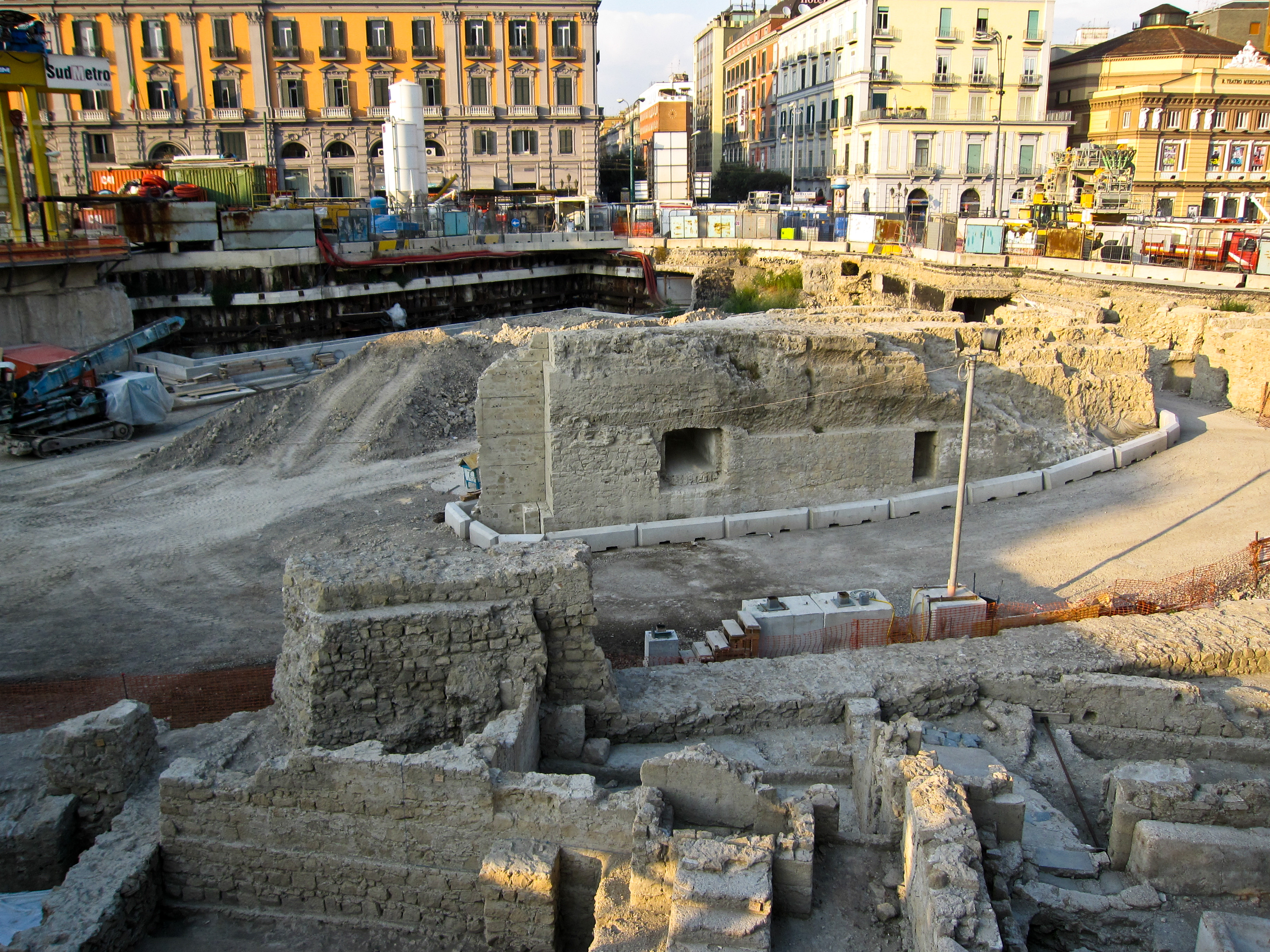
Excavations of Villa of Lucullus, Naples, 2006

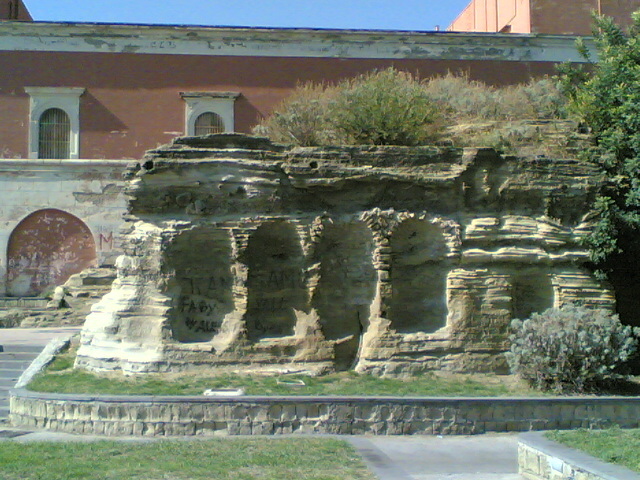
Villa of Lucullus on Monte Echia, Naples

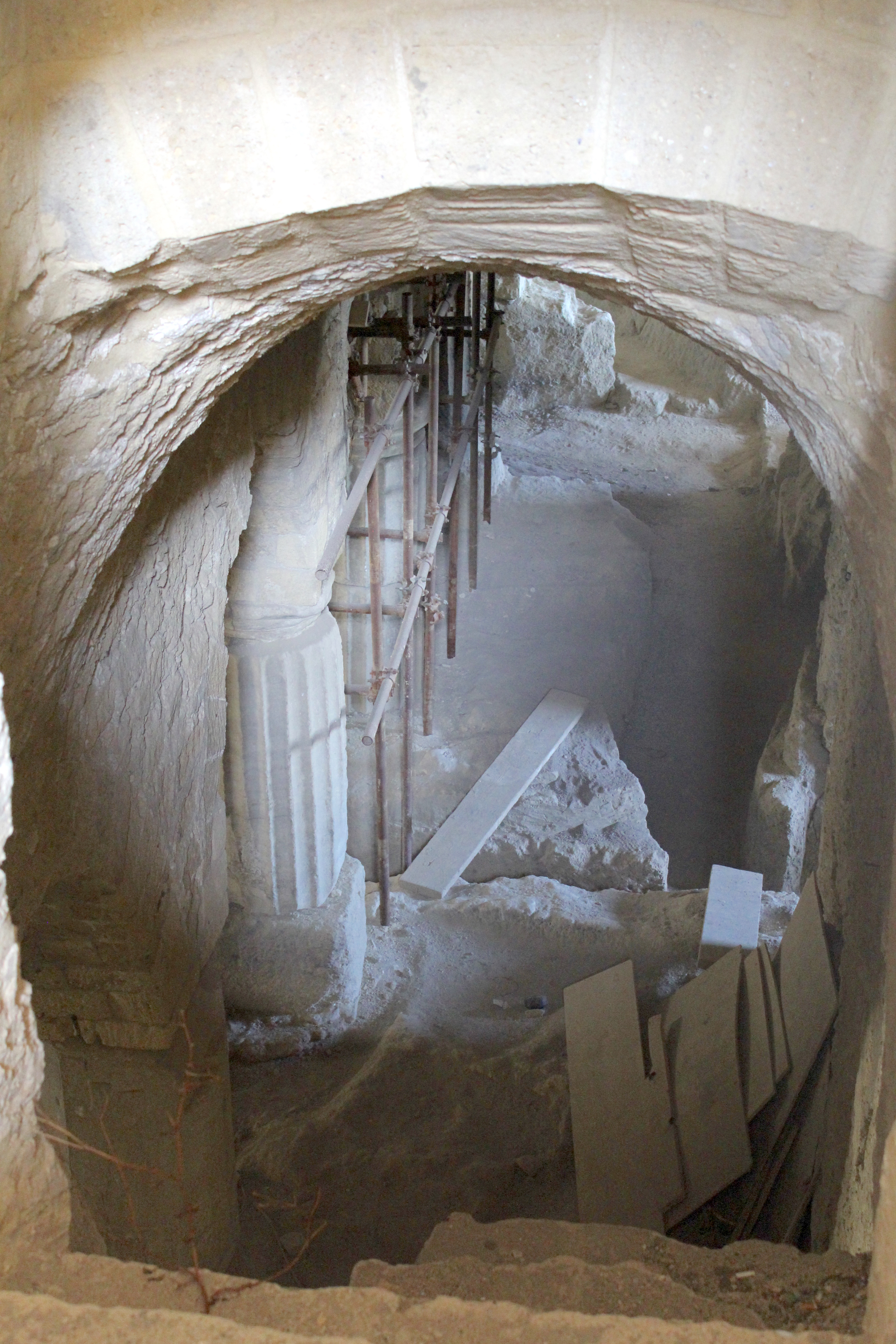
Hall of columns, Castel dell'Ovo

The villa of Lucullus was an extensive and sumptuous ancient Roman villa built in the first century BC in Naples by the famous gourmet, general and consul Lucius Licinius Lucullus. It was one of his several known villas in addition to the Gardens of Lucullus in Rome, one in Tusculum in the Alban Hills, one on the island of Nisida and another at Misenum also in the Bay of Naples.

The villa was equipped with piers that stretched out into the sea, a very rich library, fish ponds and moray eel farms and lavish gardens with peach trees imported from Persia which for the time were a novelty along with the cherry trees he brought in from Cerasus.

It was here that it was said that Lucullus had a "mountain" pierced at a greater outlay than he had spent on his villa, in order to make a channel to connect the sea to his fish ponds; for this reason Pompey the Great called him "Xerxes in a toga".

The villa was so famous for its banquets that even today the adjective Lucullan indicates a particularly abundant and delicious meal.

At some point after the death of Lucullus (57/56 BC), the villa passed to the Roman emperor; later, under Valentinian III (419-455), it was transformed into a fortress, and since then has been called the castellum Lucullanum, and was the place of exile of Romulus Augustulus, the last Western Roman Emperor.

== Remains ==
Remains of the villa, given its enormous area, are visible at several places in the city of Naples. The villa included and extended from the islet of Megaride where its nucleus stood, to Mount Echia on the south side and, most likely on the south-east side up to the district of Maschio Angioino.

The largest and perhaps most important nucleus is located in the cellar of the Castel dell'Ovo situated on the islet of Megaride, the so-called "hall of columns" derived from the Roman columns still standing. Other parts are visible on the Pizzofalcone hill where the city was founded in the 8-9th century BC and many near Piazza Municipio after recent finds.
